= HMS Majestic =

Four ships of the Royal Navy have been named HMS Majestic, whilst another was planned:

- HMS Majestic (1785) was a 74-gun third rate launched in 1785, razeed into a 56-gun fourth-rate frigate in 1814 and broken up in 1816 after a stranding.
- HMS Majestic (1853) was a screw-propelled 80-gun second rate launched in 1853 and broken up in 1868.
- HMS Majestic was to have been a Colossus-class battleship. She was renamed Edinburgh two days before being launched in 1882, and was sold in 1910.
- HMS Majestic (1895) was Majestic-class battleship launched in 1895 and sunk by U-21 in 1915.
- HMS Majestic (R77) was a Majestic-class aircraft carrier launched in 1945. Work was suspended in 1946, she was later completed in 1955 and transferred to the Royal Australian Navy that year as HMAS Melbourne. She was broken up in 1985.

== See also ==
- HMS Majestic II, a First World War auxiliary minesweeper sunk in 1916
