= Cádiz International Maritime Exhibition (1887) =

1887 maritime and industrial fair held in Cádiz, Spain

The Cádiz International Maritime Exhibition (Spanish: Exposición Marítima Internacional de Cádiz), officially named the Cádiz National Maritime Exhibition, was a technological, industrial and naval fair held in Cádiz, Spain, between 15 August and 15 November 1887. Although contemporary documents and press usually called it "international" because of the notable participation of foreign naval powers, its official administrative designation was "national", since it was never formally registered as an international exhibition.

Its main purpose was to demonstrate the suitability of the Bay of Cádiz for a modern heavy shipbuilding industry, at a time of local economic crisis following the decline of colonial trade with the Americas and of state-driven renewal of the Spanish Navy.

== Historical background ==
During the last third of the 19th century Cádiz was going through a prolonged economic recession caused by the diminishing weight of trade with the former American colonies. At the same time the Spanish government passed the Fleet Act of 1887 (known as the Rodríguez Arias Act), which allocated extraordinary funds to the domestic construction of steel warships for the navy.

A group of the Cádiz middle class, with the physician Cayetano del Toro among its main promoters, launched the exhibition as a means of creating the investor confidence needed to place Cádiz in competition with other industrial centres such as Bilbao for the shipbuilding contracts arising from that act.

== Organisation and funding ==
Unlike other similar fairs of the period, the state provided no direct aid, so organisation and funding fell mainly to the Provincial Council of Cádiz and to private initiative. The main sources of funding were a public subscription in which 1,978 contributors raised 95,586 pesetas; contributions from the municipalities of the province totalling 275,000 pesetas; and an extraordinary draw of the Spanish national lottery, authorised by the Cortes, which produced 388,675 pesetas.

The Compañía Trasatlántica Española and its chairman Claudio López Bru, Marquis of Comillas, sponsored the event with 50,000 pesetas as well as shipping support for the transport of goods and visitors. The exhibition was officially opened in August 1887 by the Minister of State, Segismundo Moret, on behalf of the king, with various authorities and foreign naval representatives in attendance, among them the Duke of Edinburgh.

== The site ==
The grounds were laid out at Punta de la Vaca and around the San Severiano district, over a total area of 180,000 m², of which some 40,000 m² were reclaimed from the sea by hydraulic filling.

The complex, built in timber with Neo-Mudéjar features and arranged in a fan shape, is attributed to the provincial architect Amadeo Rodríguez. It comprised seven radial pavilions whose ends, facing the dock, evoked ships' bows, together with two machinery halls, an authorities' pavilion and a general bazaar with about forty commercial stands.

== Sections and content ==
=== Floating section ===
During the 1887 exhibition the Bay of Cádiz hosted an unusually large naval gathering for the period: 33 warships — 10 Spanish and 23 foreign — from eleven countries, carrying 323 guns and, according to the printed total, 10,687 crew. The list below reproduces the table published in the executive committee's Memoria general (Cádiz, 1888, p. 9) and adds, where possible, the modern identification of the ships and their commanders, whose foreign names are heavily garbled in the original.

==== Spanish ships ====
Spanish ships
No.	Ship	Name as printed	Country	Commander (as printed)	Identified commander	Guns	Crew
1	Cruiser Navarra	Navarra	Spain	Capitán de navío Alejandro M. Ory	Alejandro María de Ory	18	318
2	Cruiser Castilla	Castilla	Spain	Capitán de navío José Pérez Lazaga	José Pérez y Lazaga	6	390
3	Frigate Blanca	Blanca	Spain	Capitán de navío Vicente de Manterola	Vicente de Manterola	8	289
4	Ironclad frigate Numancia	Numancia	Spain	Capitán de navío Antonio de la Rocha	Antonio de la Rocha Aranda	15	640
5	Gunboat Paz	Paz	Spain	José Ramos Izquierdo	José Ramos Izquierdo	1	48
6	Schooner Ligera	Ligera	Spain	Banassa	—	8	99
7	Gunboat Tarifa	Tarifa	Spain	Cervera	—	2	44
8	Steamer Legazpi	Legaspi	Spain	Gómez	—	2	94
9	Gunboat Cocodrilo	Cocodrilo	Spain	Barrera	—	2	46
10	Gunboat Gaditano	Gaditano	Spain	Córdoba	—	2	58

==== Foreign ships ====
Foreign ships
No.	Ship	Name as printed	Country	Commander (as printed)	Identified commander	Guns	Crew
11	Ironclad frigate HMS Alexandra	Alexandra	United Kingdom	Mr. Feblooves	—	12	728
12	Ironclad frigate HMS Temeraire	Temeraire	United Kingdom	Mr. Deumond	Edmund Charles Drummond	8	450
13	Turret ship HMS Colossus	Colomis	United Kingdom	Mr. Bidge	Cyprian Arthur George Bridge	4	650
14	Turret ship HMS Agamemnon	Agamenon	United Kingdom	Mr. Dale	Alfred Thomas Dale	18	400
15	Unidentified	Flumdese	United Kingdom	Mr. Stewart	Walter Stewart (?)	4	400
16	Turret ship HMS Dreadnought	Draudougth	United Kingdom	Mr. Stpheson	Henry Frederick Stephenson	4	400
17	Unidentified	Mirror	United Kingdom	Mr. Halesdussum	—	50	790
18	Ironclad Caio Duilio	Duilio	Italy	S. A. R. el Príncipe de Saboya	Prince Tommaso, Duke of Genoa	—	428
19	Gunboat Zaire	Zaide	Portugal	Sr. Pereira	—	4	120
20	Ironclad Courbet	Courbet	France	Mr. Mayber	—	8	669
21	Sloop-of-war USS Portsmouth	Portmouth	United States	Mr. Wite	White (?)	12	250
22	Gunboat Koreets	Koceguts	Russian Empire	Mr. Osteltsky	Osteletsky (?)	13	276
23	Dispatch vessel SMS Hum (?)	Huson	Austria-Hungary	S. A. R. el Príncipe Carlos Esteban	Archduke Charles Stephen of Austria	15	132
24	Frigate SMS Laudon	Lundun	Austria-Hungary	Sr. Voitn	—	15	530
25	Corvette HNoMS Ellida	Ellide	Norway	Falmenos	—	6	135
26	Frigate SMS Stein	Selinlge	German Empire	Sr. Stem	—	16	446
27	Corvette Zr.Ms. Zilveren Kruis	Zilvenre	Netherlands	Kuns Joks	J. C. Joekes	10	250
28	Sloop-of-war USS Quinnebaug	Qurnnebang	United States	Mr. Jolger	William Mayhew Folger	8	201
29	Corvette SMS Ariadne	Ariadne	German Empire	Mr. Barandisin	Carl Barandon	8	248
30	Gunboat SMS Albatros	Albatros	Austria-Hungary	Mr. Poll	Pohl / Pol(l) (?)	—	114
31	Frigate SMS Prinz Adalbert	Prinz Adalbert	German Empire	Bon Pawell	Friedrich von Pawelsz	12	485
32	Frigate SMS Gneisenau	Guisenan	German Empire	Bon Thonsen	August Thomsen	16	445
33	Corvette SMS Moltke	Moltke	German Empire	Dautwir	—	16	445

Totals according to the source: 33 ships, 323 guns and 10,687 crew.

Adding up the printed crew figures gives 11,018; the total of 10,687 at the foot of the original table does not match. The 1888 editor's printed figure is retained here. The garbled foreign spellings of the original ("Colomis", "Draudougth", "Qurnnebang", "Guisenan" and others) have been identified by comparison with naval lists and contemporary press; cases without a secure identification are marked as unidentified.

=== Land section ===
This section displayed boilers, steam engines, torpedoes, ship models, artillery pieces and other technical advances linked to the shipbuilding industry. The fair also included a space devoted to the agricultural and fishing production of the province, with awards to products from towns such as Conil de la Frontera, Jerez de la Frontera and Sanlúcar de Barrameda, among them salted tuna and the wines of the area.

== Innovations and discoveries ==
- Electric lighting: the concert hall and the general bazaar stayed open at night thanks to electric lighting, a technological novelty for the time that attracted considerable public attention.
- Archaeological find: during levelling work at Punta de la Vaca in May 1887 a Phoenician anthropoid sarcophagus was found by chance. The discovery led to the creation of the present-day Museum of Cádiz.
- Plant anchor: in the English-style gardens of the grounds a planted composition in the shape of an anchor some 40 metres long was laid out.

== Legacy ==
In July 1891 the Vea-Murguía brothers opened, on part of the same ground and reusing infrastructure from the exhibition site, the first modern shipyard in the city. This works is regarded as the origin of the contemporary shipbuilding industry of the Bay of Cádiz.

== CIME 2027 ==
Marking the 140th anniversary of the exhibition, the Port of Cádiz, the industry associations APEMAR and FEMCA, the Cádiz maritime and naval cluster and the Cádiz Chamber of Commerce are developing a new edition under the name CIME (Cádiz International Maritime Exhibition), planned for 5-7 October 2027 in Cádiz. The project was presented at the SMM trade fair in Hamburg in September 2026 and covers shipbuilding, defence, ports and logistics, offshore energy, the blue economy and maritime services.

== See also ==
- Bay of Cádiz
- Spanish Navy
- Museum of Cádiz
