= Ajax-class ironclad =

Class of Royal Navy ironclads

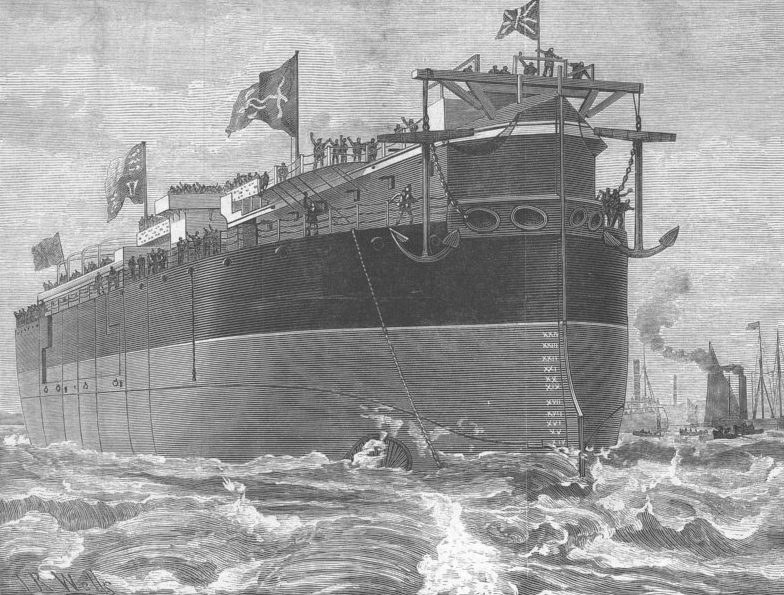
- Launch of HMS Agamemnon in 1879 from The Illustrated London News

Class overview
- Builders: Pembroke Dockyard; Chatham Dockyard
- Preceded by: HMS Inflexible
- Succeeded by: Colossus class
- Built: 1876–1883
- In commission: 1884–1904
- Completed: 2

General characteristics
- Type: Ironclad battleship
- Displacement: 8,510 tons
- Length: 300 ft 9 in (91.67 m) o/a; 280 ft (85 m) p/p
- Beam: 66 ft (20 m)
- Draught: 23 ft 6 in (7.16 m)
- Propulsion: Two-shaft Penn inverted compound; 6,000 ihp (4,500 kW)
- Speed: 13 kn (24 km/h)
- Endurance: 2,100 nmi (3,900 km; 2,400 mi) at 9 kn (17 km/h; 10 mph)
- Complement: 345
- Armament: 4 × 12.5-inch (317 mm) muzzle-loading rifles; 2 × BL 6-inch (152.4 mm) Mk II guns
- Armour: Citadel: 18 in (460 mm) to 15 in (380 mm); Turret: 14 in (360 mm), 16 in (410 mm) faces; Conning tower: 12 in (300 mm); Bulkheads: 16.5 in (420 mm) to 13.5 in (340 mm); Deck: 3 in (76 mm)

The Ajax class, also known as the Agamemnon class, was a class of ironclad battleships that served in the Royal Navy during the Victorian era. The class consisted of two ships, HMS Ajax and HMS Agamemnon that had a turret-mounted main armament. They were the first ships in the Royal Navy to be fitted with a secondary armament and the last to be armed with muzzle-loading rifles. They were hard to control due to their wide beam, shallow draught and flat bottom, and were heavily criticised in service. Launched in 1879, Agamemnon grounded in the Suez Canal while transiting in 1884 and, in 1889, participated in the Royal Navy blockade of the Sultanate of Zanzibar in the fight against the Indian Ocean slave trade. Ajax remained in the UK to serve as a coastguard ship in Greenock and collided with the battleship Devastation off the coast of the Isle of Portland in 1887. They were sold to be broken up in 1903 and 1904 respectively.

== Design and development ==
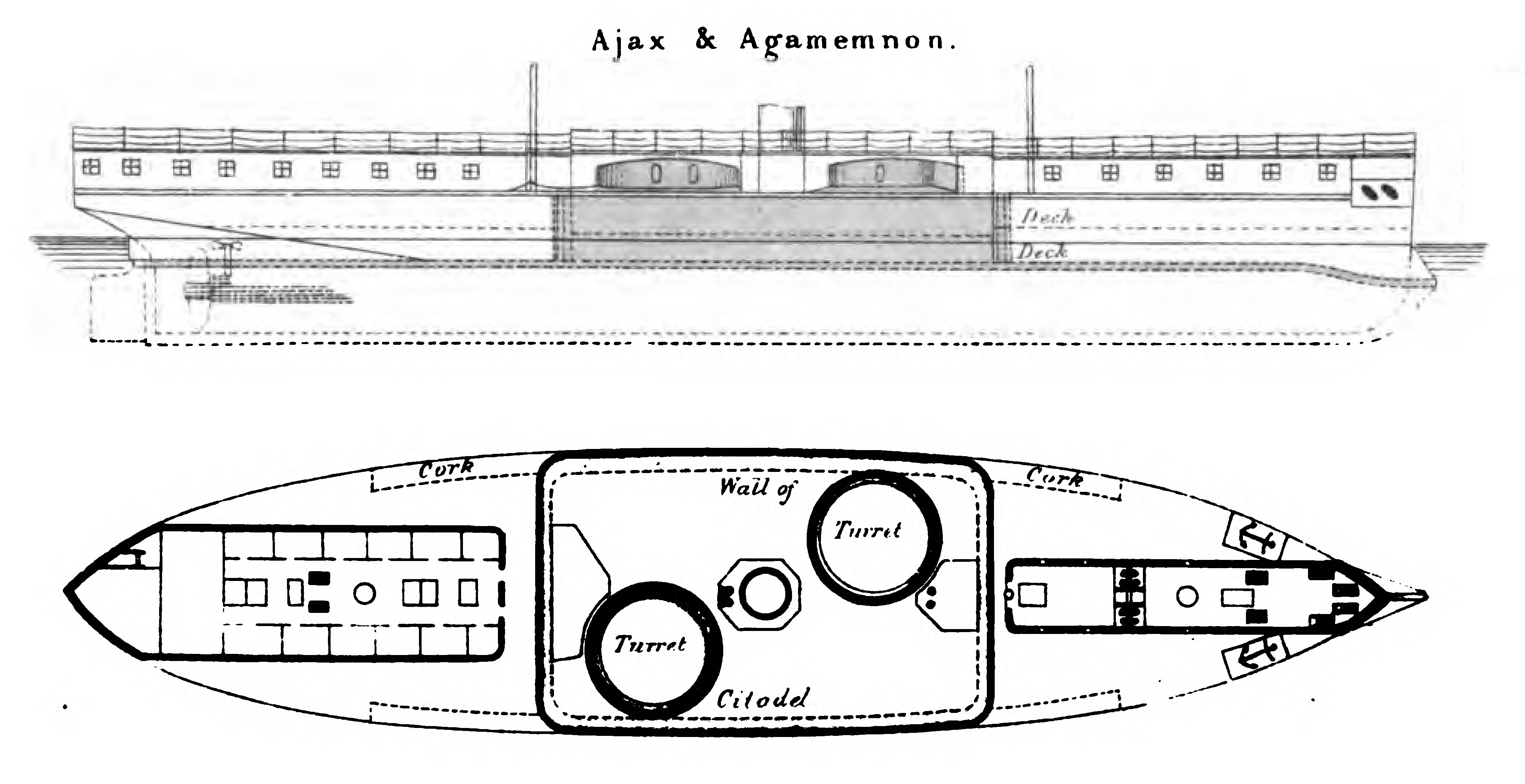
Right elevation and plan of the Ajax class from Brassey's Naval Annual, 1886

Designed by Nathaniel Barnaby, the two ships of the Ajax class were built to the same concept as their predecessor, HMS Inflexible; they were to have a heavily armoured citadel carrying four heavy guns mounted 'en echelon' in turrets to achieve all-round fire. They were of lighter draught and it was therefore necessary to arm them with guns of 12.5-inch (317 mm) calibre, as against 16-inch (406 mm) in Inflexible, and to accept a maximum speed of nearly two knots less. Also, unlike Inflexible, these ships were dependent upon the integrity of their unarmoured ends to maintain buoyancy; should the ends have been damaged enough to become waterlogged, the ships would have sunk.

The ships were lighter than Inflexible with a displacement at full load of 8,510 long tons (8,650 t). They had a shorter overall length of 300 ft 9 in (91.67 m), 280 ft (85 m) between perpendiculars, a smaller beam of 66 ft (20 m) and a smaller draught of 23 ft 6 in (7.16 m). They had a metacentric height of between 5 ft 6 in (1.68 m) and 8 ft 3 in (2.51 m) They were powered by a three-cylinder inverted compound marine steam engine provided by Penn that drove two propeller shafts at 70 rpm. Steam was provided by ten coal-burning tubular boilers. The power plant was rated at 6,000 indicated horsepower (4,500 kW) which had a design speed of 13 knots (24 km/h; 15 mph) at 60 lb (27 kg) pressure. The ships carried a maximum of 970 long tons (986 t) of coal, enough to steam 2,100 nautical miles (3,900 km; 2,400 mi) at 9 knots (17 km/h; 10 mph). They were designed from the start not to carry any form of sailing rig. The ship's complement numbered 345 sailors of all ranks.

This class were the last ships in the Royal Navy to be armed with muzzle-loading rifles. They were armed with a main armament of four 12.5-inch (317 mm) muzzle-loading rifles mounted in two turrets. There had been some debate during the design process on this, with the designer and Vesey Hamilton both arguing for breechloaders. However, the opinion, led by Admiral Arthur Hood, of the Admiralty was upheld and the same muzzle-loaders were carried as had been mounted on previous vessels. These guns were supported by, for the first time in a British ship, a secondary armament. This consisted of two BL 6-inch (152.4 mm) Mk II guns mounted singly. One was placed on the forward superstructure and the other right aft. Six 6-pounder guns quick-firing guns were also carried.

The ship's armour was built around a citadel that was 104 ft (32 m) long. It was 18 in (460 mm) thick at the waterline, 15 in (380 mm) above and below. It composed of iron plates of between 8 and 10 in (200 and 250 mm) thickness backed up by teak that was 10 in (250 mm) thick. The fore and aft bulkheads were fitted with armour that was 16.5 in (420 mm) thick above the waterline and 13.5 in (340 mm) below the waterline. The deck was protected with 3 in (76 mm) thick armour. The class were, alongside Inflexible, the first in the Royal Navy to use compound armour, used to protect the turrets. Each turret was protected by 14 in (360 mm) armour, with 16 in (410 mm) on its face. The ship was fitted with a narrow conning tower on the forward superstructure that had an 18 in (460 mm) slot for viewing and was 12 in (300 mm) thick. The total weight of the armour on each ship was 2,223 long tons (2,259 t), representing 26.1 per cent of the total displacement.

== Ships ==
Name	Builder	Laid down	Launched	Completed
Ajax	Pembroke Dockyard	21 March 1876	10 March 1880	30 March 1883
Agamemnon	Chatham Dockyard	9 May 1876	17 September 1879	29 March 1883

Designed to be cheaper than their predecessor, at an estimated cost of £420,000 per ship, the shipyards overran and the eventual costs for the ships was £548,393 for Ajax and £530,015 for Agamemnon.

== Service ==
As with the preceding Belleisle-class, the two ships in the class led very different careers. After being completed, Agamemnon initially acted as a drill ship and was fitted with additional equipment. Commissioned during September 1884, the vessel was sent to China. On the journey, the vessel ran aground in the Suez Canal, blocking passage for other ships and causing disruption over many days. The vessel also shadowed the Russian armoured cruiser Vladimir Monomakh on the way. Ajax was commissioned on 30 April 1885 and sailed to Greenock to act as a coastguard ship during the following September. Both ships had their sterns altered in 1886, Agamemnon in Malta and Ajax in Chatham. In 1887, Ajax collided with the battleship Devastation off the coast of the Isle of Portland.

In February 1889, Agamemnon was deployed to the East Indies Station and served as part of the blockade of the Sultanate of Zanzibar, participating in the Royal Navy's efforts against the Indian Ocean slave trade. This service finished in November and the vessel returned to the Mediterranean Sea. Ajax was placed in reserve at Chatham in April 1891, Agamemnon joining the reserve fleet at Devonport in October the following year. In November 1901, the vessels were made dockyard reserve and ineffective. Agamemnon was sold to be broken up in 1903, Ajax following in March 1904.

Operationally, the vessels were a failure and heavily criticised in service. According to naval historian Oscar Parkes, they were "two of the most unsatisfactory battleships ever built for the Royal Navy." Similarly, naval historian Herbert Wrigley Wilson called them "a decided failure; slow, ill-armoured, ill-armed, unsteerable." They were particularly poor sailers, being hard to keep in a straight line and only able to manoeuvre as part of a squadron when travelling at less than 10 knots (19 km/h; 12 mph). The combination of a wide beam, shallow draught and flat bottom made them particularly skittish; Agamemnon managed to complete a turn to port in 9 minutes and ten seconds before being brought back under control.

== Bibliography ==
- Beeler, John (2001). Birth of the Battleship: British Capital Ship Design 1870-1881. Naval Institute Press. ISBN 1-55750-213-7.
- Brown, David K. (1997). Warrior to Dreadnought: Warship Development 1860–1905. London: Chatham Publishing. ISBN 978-1-84832-086-4.
- Burt, Ray A. (2013). British Battleships 1889–1904. Annapolis, Maryland: Naval Institute Press. ISBN 978-1-59114-065-8.
- McCord, Norman & Purdue, Bill (2023). British History 1815-1914. Oxford: Oxford University Press. ISBN 978-0-19926-164-2.
- Parkes, Oscar (1990) [1966]. British Battleships, Warrior 1860 to Vanguard 1950: A History of Design, Construction, and Armament (New & rev. ed.). Annapolis, Maryland: Naval Institute Press. ISBN 978-1-55750-075-5.
- Roberts, John (1979). "Great Britain (including Empire Forces)". In Chesneau, Roger & Kolesnik, Eugene M. (eds.). Conway's All the World's Fighting Ships 1860–1905. New York: Mayflower Books. pp. 1–113. ISBN 978-0-83170-302-8.
- Wilson, Herbert Wrigley (1896). Ironclads in Action: a sketch of naval warfare from 1855 to 1895, with some account of the development of the battleship in England. London: Sampson Low. OCLC 1101318528.
