= Colossus class battleship =

Two classes of battleship of the Royal Navy are known as the Colossus class:

- The first Colossus class consisted of two 2nd class battleships launched in 1882.
- The second Colossus class consisted of two dreadnoughts launched in 1910 that served in World War I.
