= HMS Colossus (1882) =

1886 Colossus-class ironclad battleship

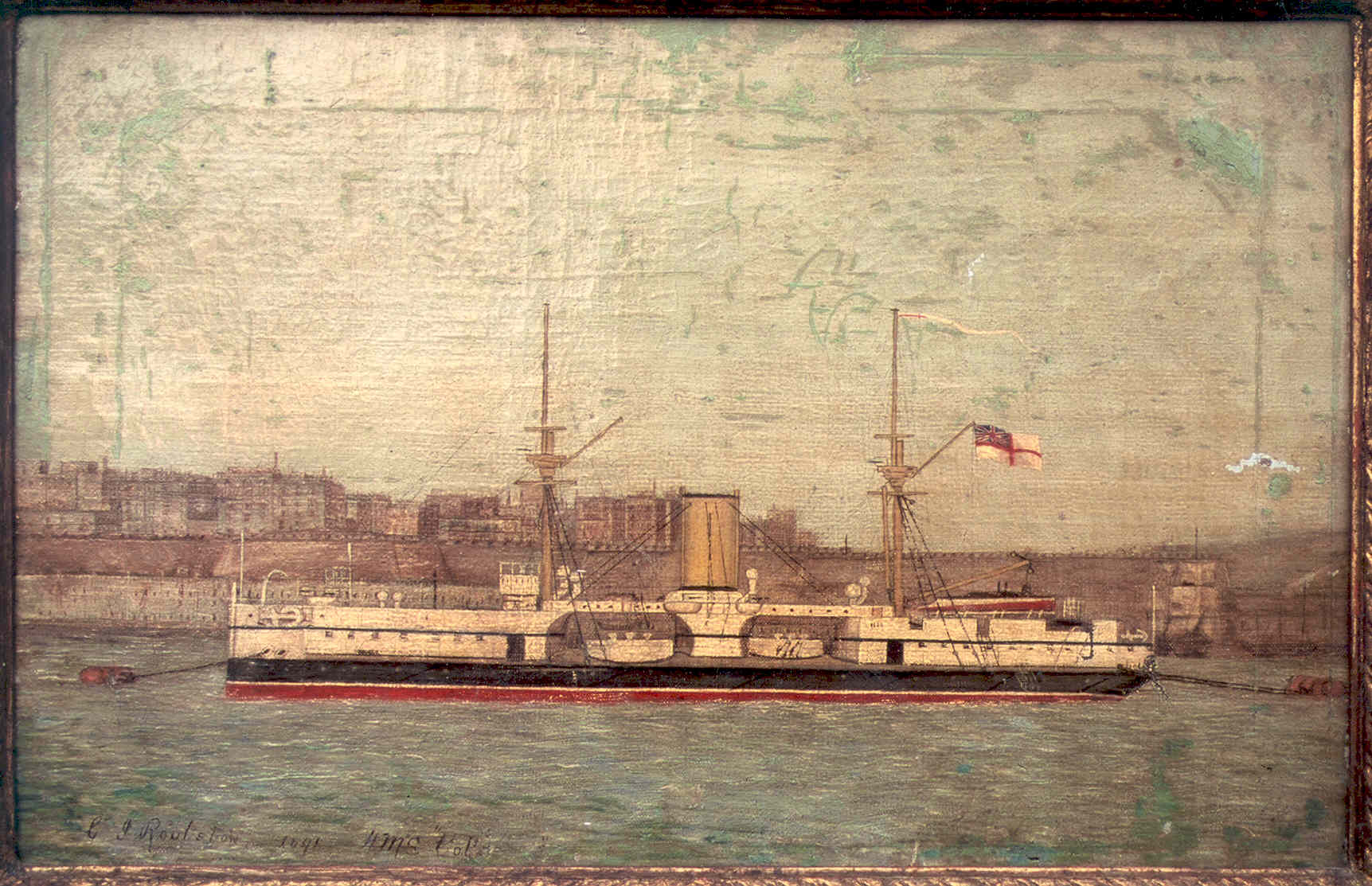
- HMS Colossus, painted in 1891, Malta?

History

United Kingdom
- Builder: Portsmouth Dockyard
- Laid down: 6 June 1879
- Launched: 21 March 1882
- Commissioned: 31 October 1886
- Fate: Sold 1908 to Thos. W. Ward and broken up

General characteristics
- Class & type: Colossus-class ironclad
- Displacement: 9,420 long tons (9,570 t)
- Length: 325 feet (99.1 m) lpp
- Beam: 68 ft (21 m)
- Draught: 25 ft 9 in (7.85 m)
- Installed power: 10 × fire-tube boilers; 7,488 indicated horsepower (5,584 kW)
- Propulsion: 2 × marine steam engines; 2 × screw propellers
- Speed: 16.5 knots (30.6 km/h; 19.0 mph)
- Complement: 396
- Armament: 4 × BL 12 in (305 mm) guns; 5 × BL 6 in (152 mm) guns; 4 × 6-pounder; 2 × 14-inch torpedo tubes
- Armour: Citadel: 14 to 18 inches (356 to 457 mm); Bulkheads: 13 to 16 in (330 to 406 mm); Deck: 2.5 to 3 in (64 to 76 mm); Turrets: 14 to 16 in; Conning tower: 14 in

The fourth HMS Colossus was a Colossus class second-class British battleship, launched in 1882 and commissioned in 1886. She had a displacement of 9,520 tons, and an armament of 4 × 12-inch breech-loaders, 5 × 6-inch guns and had a respectable speed of 15.5 knots.

She was one of the first, if not the first, modern battleship. She had several features which would be standard for all gun warships up to the Second World War including all steel construction, a main battery of breech loading major calibre guns (i.e.. 10 inches or greater) mounted in turrets and was propelled only by steam engines instead of a combination of steam and sails - as was common in the mid-19th century.

== Design ==
The design for the Colossus class was based on the earlier Ajax class of turret ships, but with numerous improvements. They were larger, slightly faster, and had improved handling characteristics and significantly more powerful armament. Instead of older muzzle-loading guns, Colossus reintroduced breech-loading guns to Royal Navy service, along with a secondary battery, a feature not included in older ironclads. The new ship also incorporated compound armour instead of the traditional wrought iron armour used in earlier vessels. In addition, the ship's hull was constructed with steel, not iron.

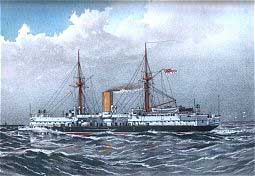
HMS Colossus

Colossus was 325 feet (99.1 m) long between perpendiculars and had a beam of 68 ft (21 m) and a draught of 25 ft 9 in (7.85 m). She displaced 9,420 long tons (9,570 t). The ship had a long, raised fore and sterncastle connected by a hurricane deck. The superstructure consisted of a small conning tower atop the forecastle. She had a crew of 396 officers and ratings. Her propulsion system consisted of two 3-cylinder marine steam engines powered by ten coal-fired fire-tube boilers, which were vented through a single large funnel located amidships. Her engines provided a top speed of 16.5 knots (30.6 km/h; 19.0 mph) at 7,488 indicated horsepower (5,584 kW). When steaming at full speed, the ship had a cruising range of 2,343 nautical miles (4,339 km; 2,696 mi).

The ship was armed with a main battery of four BL 12-inch (305 mm) breech-loading guns in twin-gun turrets, which were placed en echelon amidships, fore and aft of the funnel. Colossus also carried a secondary battery of five BL 6-inch (152 mm) breech-loading guns. These were carried in individual pivot mounts, one on either side of the forward superstructure, another pair abreast the aft superstructure, and the final gun on the upper deck at the stern. She also carried four QF 6-pounder guns for defence against torpedo boats. As was customary for capital ships of the period, she was equipped with a pair of 14-inch (356 mm) torpedo tubes.

Colossus's armoured citadel was 14 to 18 inches (356 to 457 mm) thick on the sides and reduced to 13 to 16 in (330 to 406 mm) on its rounded bulkheads, where it was intended to deflect incoming projectiles. It was 123 ft (37 m) long, slightly more than a third of the ship's length, and covered the ship's ammunition magazines and propulsion machinery spaces. She carried a protective deck that was 2.5 to 3 in (64 to 76 mm) thick and sloped downward at the sides. Above and below the deck, coal storage spaces were arranged to provide additional defence against gunfire. The main battery turrets had 14 to 16 in of armour plate, and the conning tower had 14 in sides.

== Service history ==
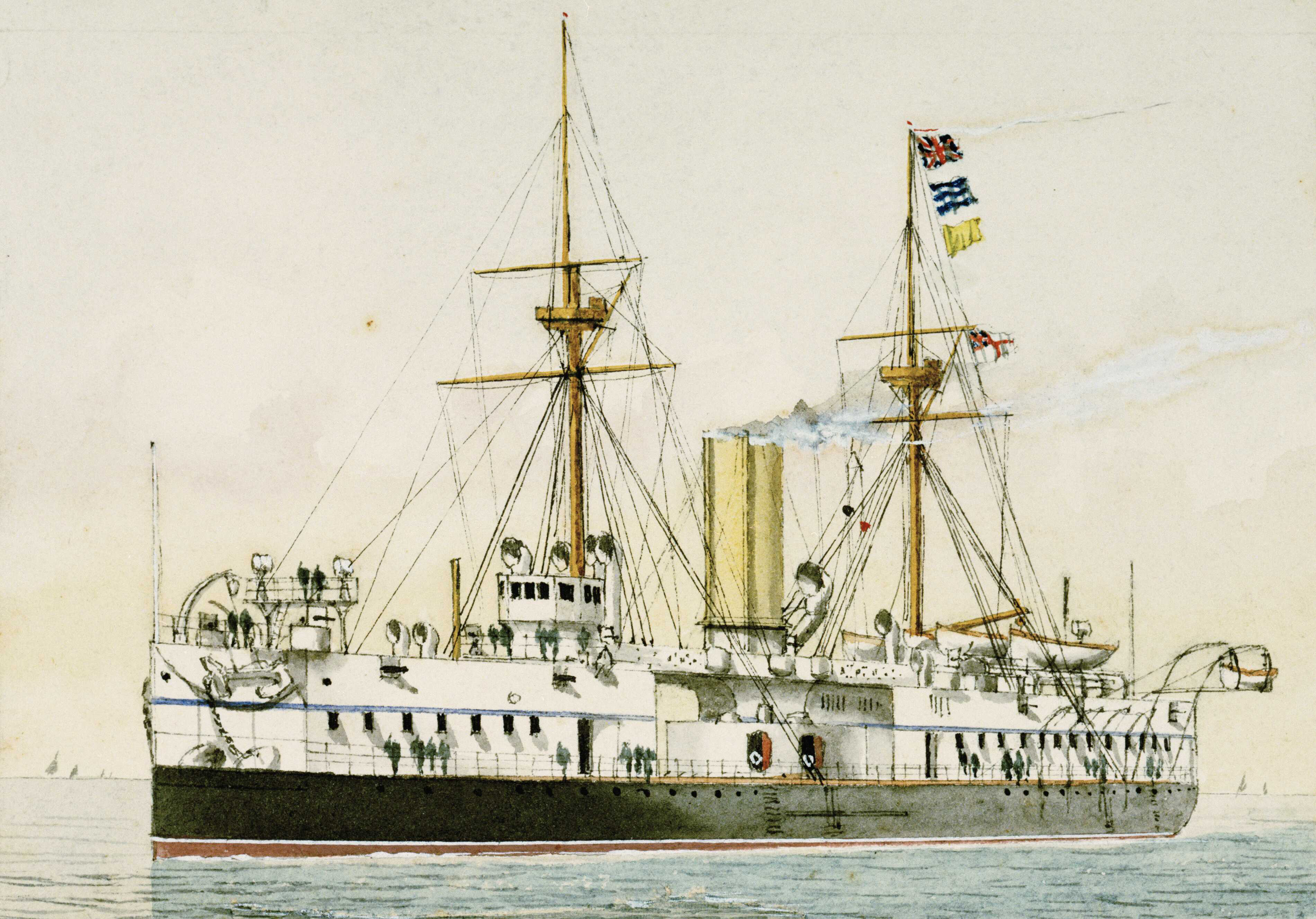
HMS Colossus, 1887

Colossus was laid down at the Portsmouth Royal Dockyard on 6 June 1879. She was launched on 21 March 1882 and was completed, apart from her armament, in 1883, allowing her to conduct sea trials later that year and into 1884. These included speed tests in January 1884 and extensive shooting tests in July 1885. Delays with the delivery of her guns prevented her from being completed for active service until 31 October 1886. At that time, she joined the new armoured cruiser Imperieuse for a training cruise that included a stop in Vigo, Spain. During the voyage, Colossus rolled severely in bad weather and took on water through the gun ports in her turrets, while Imperieuse was not similarly affected. She was then assigned to the Mediterranean Fleet, serving there until 1893. At that time, she was reduced to a coastguard ship, based in Holyhead. Colossus participated in the fleet manoeuvres in August 1894, serving as part of the "Blue" fleet commanded by Rear Admiral Edward Seymour. She was assigned to Group 1 of the fleet, which also included her sister ship Edinburgh, the recently completed pre-dreadnought battleship Barfleur, and the ironclads Alexandra, Benbow, and Inflexible, and the protected cruiser St George. The exercises lasted around 36 hours before the results were decided in favour of "Blue" fleet. During the manoeuvres, Colossus was judged to have been disabled by coastal artillery at Belfast.

In August 1895, Colossus was again reactivated to take part in the annual fleet manoeuvres as part of the Reserve Fleet. At that time, the capital ships assigned to the fleet included Edinburg, Alexandra, Benbow, and the ironclad Dreadnought. The ships were mobilised at Torbay in early August, went to sea on the 8th, and carried out various training exercises, including shooting practice and tactical manoeuvres, before returning to port on 20 August. During the 1896 fleet manoeuvres, Colossus, Edinburgh, Alexandra, and Benbow were joined by the old ironclad Sultan in Fleet C, one of four organized for the exercises. Fleet C operated in concert with Fleet D, again commanded by Seymour. He was given the objective to combine his fleets and either defeat the strong A and B fleets in detail or to reach the fortified port of Lough Swilly. The ships went to sea on 24 July and by the morning of 30 July, Seymour had succeeded in uniting his fleets but failed to bring Fleet A to battle, and therefore took his ships to Lough Swilly.

Captain Samuel Arthur Johnson was in command from March 1897 to March 1900, and at that point, she was still serving as a coastguard ship at Holyhead. During this period, on 26 June 1897, Colossus was present for the fleet review held for Queen Victoria's Diamond Jubilee. The ship once again participated in the fleet manoeuvres in 1897; that year, the Reserve Fleet was divided into two divisions for its own exercises apart from the active Channel Fleet. Colossus was assigned to the 1st Division, along with Alexandra, Benbow, Howe, Devastation, and Collingwood. The exercises lasted from 7 to 11 July. The Royal Navy did not hold large scale manoeuvres in 1898. Colossus participated in the 1899 fleet exercises, which lasted from 29 July to 5 August, and saw the ships of the Reserve Fleet attempt to protect a convoy from attacks by a faster but numerically inferior Channel Fleet. Neither fleet encountered each other during the exercises, as visibility was limited by heavy fog. Captain James Goodrich succeeded in command from March 1900. She was paid off in November 1901 and placed in the reserve, her captain and crew transferred to HMS Resolution which took over as guardship at Holyhead. Commander Rowland Nugent was appointed in command of the ship on 25 February 1902, and from August she had a refit at the Thames Ironworks and Shipbuilding Company. The ship returned to service in 1904 as a tender to the training establishment Excellent. She served in this capacity for only a short time, and was sold to shipbreakers in 1908.
