= Colossus-class battleship =

Colossus-class battleship may refer to:

- Colossus-class battleship (1882)
- Colossus-class battleship (1910)
