= HMS Agamemnon (1879) =

1879 Ajax-class ironclad

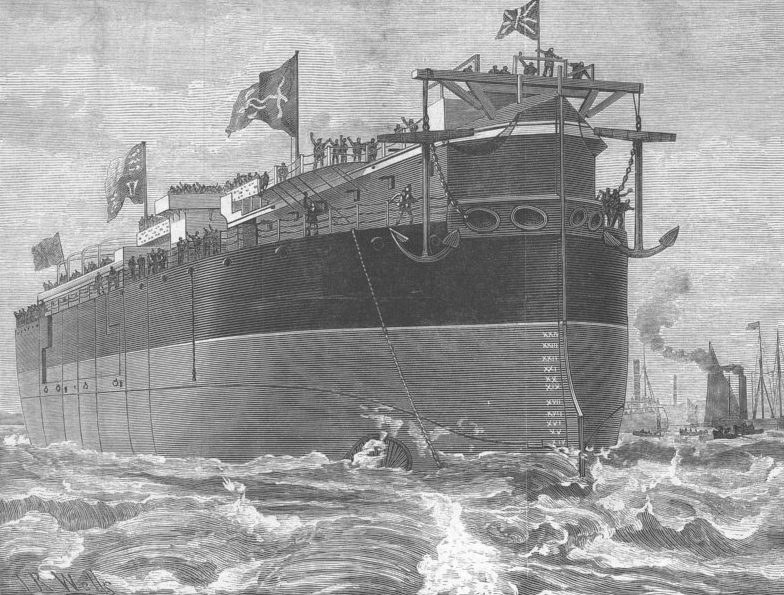
- Depiction of the launch of HMS Agamemnon from the Illustrated London News.

History

United Kingdom
- Name: HMS Agamemnon
- Namesake: Agamemnon
- Builder: Chatham Dockyard
- Laid down: 9 May 1876
- Launched: 17 September 1879
- Commissioned: 29 March 1883
- Fate: Broken up 1903

General characteristics
- Class & type: Ajax-class ironclad
- Displacement: 8,510 tons
- Length: 300 ft 9 in (91.67 m) o/a; 280 ft (85 m) p/p
- Beam: 66 ft (20 m)
- Draught: 23 ft 6 in (7.16 m)
- Propulsion: Two-shaft Penn inverted compound Penn engines; 6,000 ihp (4,500 kW)
- Speed: 13 knots (24 km/h; 15 mph)
- Complement: 345
- Armament: 4 × 12.5-inch (317 mm) muzzle-loading rifles; 2 × BL 6-inch (152.4 mm) Mk II guns
- Armour: Citadel: 18 in (460 mm) tapering to 15 in (380 mm); Turret: 16 in (410 mm) faces, 14 in (360 mm) sides; Conning tower: 12 in (300 mm); Bulkheads: 16.5 to 13.5 in (420 to 340 mm); Deck: 3 in (76 mm)

HMS Agamemnon was a Victorian Royal Navy Ajax-class ironclad turret battleship, the sister ship of HMS Ajax. Agamemnon and Ajax were built to the same design, and were smaller and less expensive versions of Inflexible. The class is known as the Ajax class because Ajax was laid down first although Agamemnon was completed one day before her sister.

== Description ==
The class was designed with a very small length to beam ratio, it being thought at the time that this would increase fuel economy. This turned out not to be the case, and also and quite unexpectedly produced the need for a large amount of helm to be applied, sometimes to port and sometimes starboard, to keep the ship on a straight course. It is reported that on one occasion Agamemnon, with her helm amidships, turned a complete circle in 9 minutes and 10 seconds.

The armament of this class was carried in two turrets mounted in the waist of the ship. The turrets were carried 'en echelon', and the intention was that at least two heavy guns would be able to bear on any point of the compass. In practice it was found that firing along the line of the keel produced unacceptable blast damage to the superstructure, so that in reality the turrets could only fire on beam arcs.

== Service history ==
Agamemnon was commissioned in September 1884 for service on the China Station. During her passage out, during the Russian war scare, she shadowed the Russian cruiser Vladimir Monomakh. She grounded several times in the Suez Canal, holding up traffic for some days. On her return to the Mediterranean in 1886 she had her stern altered at Malta in an attempt to correct her steering problems.

She did temporary duty through most of 1889 on the East Indies station, and served as part of the blockading fleet off Zanzibar in the attempt to curb the slave trade there. There was an outbreak of Dengue fever whilst stationed off Zanzibar between November 1888 and September 1889. The first case was an officer who contracted the disease in Aden. Four-fifths of the crew caught the disease (326 out of an average of complement of 406). All those affected recovered. She rejoined the Mediterranean Fleet where she stayed until 1892, paying off thereafter into the Reserve, and in 1896 into the Fleet Reserve.

Made non-effective in 1901, it was announced in January 1902 that she would be sold out of service. She was sold for scrap in 1903.
