= HMS Ajax (1880) =

UK Ajax-class ironclad

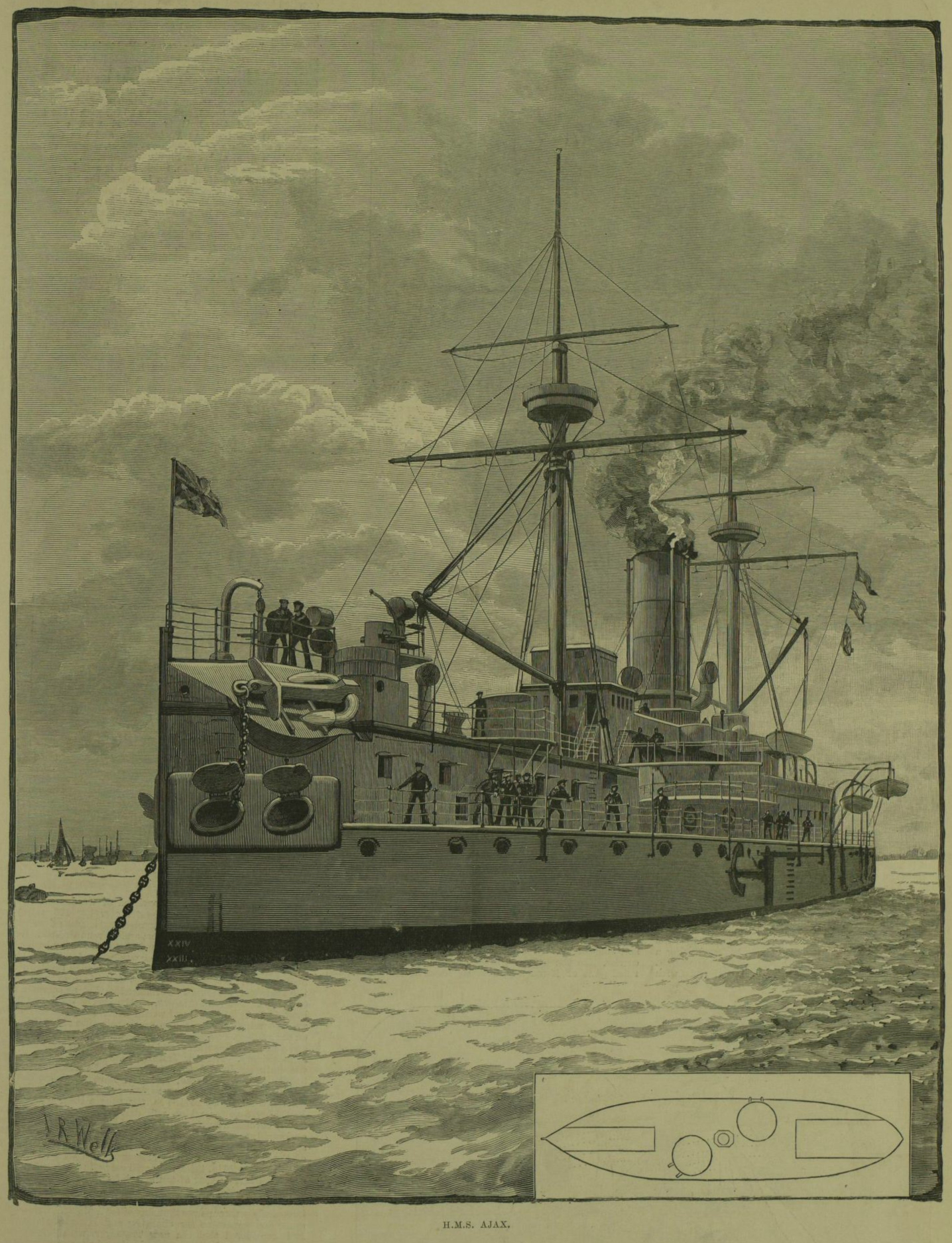
- Ajax at the Queen's Jubilee Naval Review 1887, Spithead

History

United Kingdom
- Name: Ajax
- Namesake: Ajax
- Builder: Pembroke Dockyard
- Laid down: 21 March 1876
- Launched: 10 March 1880
- Completed: 30 March 1883
- Commissioned: 30 April 1885
- Out of service: November 1901
- Fate: Sold for scrap, March 1904

General characteristics
- Class & type: Ajax-class ironclad battleship
- Displacement: 8,510 long tons (8,650 t)
- Length: 280 ft (85.3 m) (pp); 300 ft 9 in (91.7 m) (oa)
- Beam: 66 ft (20.1 m)
- Draught: 23 ft 6 in (7.2 m)
- Installed power: 6,000 ihp (4,500 kW); 10 cylindrical boilers
- Propulsion: 2 shafts; 2 compound-expansion steam engines
- Speed: 13 knots (24 km/h; 15 mph)
- Range: 2,100 nmi (3,900 km; 2,400 mi) @ 9 knots (17 km/h; 10 mph)
- Complement: 345
- Armament: 2 × twin 12.5-inch (317 mm) rifled muzzle-loading guns; 2 × single BL 6 in (152 mm), 80-pdr rifled breech-loading guns; 6 × single QF 6-pdr 2.2 in (57 mm) Nordenfelt guns; 2 × 14 in (356 mm) torpedo launchers
- Armour: Waterline belt: 15–18 in (381–457 mm); Deck: 3 in (76 mm); Gun turrets: 14–16 mm (1–1 in); Conning tower: 12 in (305 mm); Bulkheads: 13.5–16.5 in (343–419 mm)

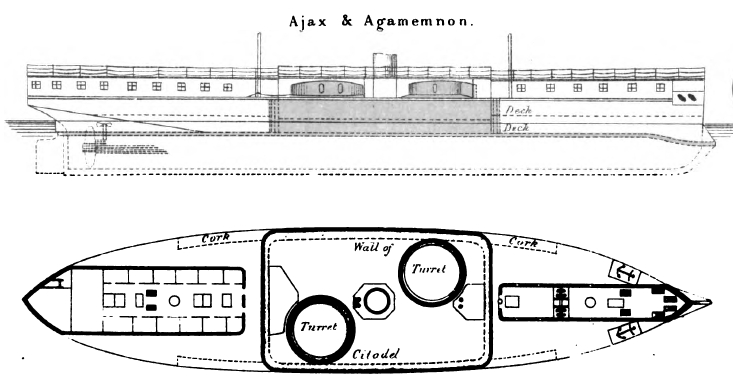
Right elevation and plan from Brassey's Naval Annual, 1886

HMS Ajax was the name ship of her class of ironclad battleships built for the Royal Navy during the 1870s. Completed in 1883, she was immediately placed in reserve until 1885 when the ship was commissioned for the first time. Later that year, Ajax was assigned as a coast guard ship in Scotland and remained there for the next six years. She was reduced to reserve again in 1891 and was taken out of service a decade later. The ship was sold for scrap in 1904 and subsequently broken up.

== Design and description ==
The Ajax class was designed as a shallow-draught version of the preceding Inflexible that was also smaller and cheaper; unfortunately the need, imposed by budgetary constraints, to produce a smaller ship produced a vessel with all of the shortcomings of Inflexible but with none of her virtues. The ships had a length between perpendiculars of 280 feet (85.3 m) and were 300 feet 9 inches (91.7 m) long overall, some 44 feet (13.4 m) shorter than Inflexible. They had a beam of 66 feet (20.1 m), and a draught of 23 feet 6 inches (7.2 m) and displaced 8,510 long tons (8,650 t). Their crew consisted of 345 officers and ratings, over 3,000 long tons (3,048 t) less than Inflexible. The Ajax-class ships were bad seaboats and steered very erratically, especially at high speed. More deadwood was added to their sterns in 1886 in a partially successful attempt to rectify the problem.

The Ajax class was powered by a pair of inverted, vertical, compound-expansion steam engines. These were built by John Penn and Sons and each drove a single propeller using steam provided by 10 cylindrical boilers. The engines were designed to produce a total of 6,000 indicated horsepower (4,500 kW) for a speed of 13 knots (24 km/h; 15 mph). The ships carried a maximum of 970 long tons (986 t) of coal, enough to steam 2,100 nautical miles (3,900 km; 2,400 mi) at 9 knots (17 km/h; 10 mph).

They copied the main armament layout of Inflexible with their turrets arranged en echelon so that both turrets could fire directly ahead and to each side, although this was more theoretical than practical due to damage from muzzle blast. Each turret mounted a pair of rifled muzzle-loading RML 12.5-inch (318 mm) guns. Their shells weighed 809 pounds (367.0 kg) while the gun itself weighed 38 long tons (39 t). The guns had a muzzle velocity of 1,575 ft/s (480 m/s) and were credited with the ability to penetrate a nominal 18.4 inches (470 mm) of wrought iron armour at the muzzle. To attack the unarmoured portion of their opponents, the Ajax class was fitted with a pair of rifled breech-loading BL 6-inch (152 mm), 80-pounder guns. For defence against torpedo boats, they carried six quick-firing QF 6-pdr 2.2 in (57 mm) Nordenfelt guns. The ships also mounted a pair of above-water 14-inch (356 mm) torpedo launchers and could carry a 60-foot (18.3 m) torpedo boat.

The Ajax class copied Inflexible's armour scheme of a heavily armoured citadel with unamoured ends and sides, but unlike their predecessor, they lacked enough buoyancy to remain afloat if their ends were flooded. The citadel was 104 feet (31.7 m) long and the armour was composed of wrought iron plates 10 and 8 inches (254 and 203 mm) thick, separated and backed by 10 inches of teak at the waterline, reducing above and below the waterline to an armoured thickness of 15 inches (381.0 mm) in a similar sandwich. The citadel was closed off by fore and aft transverse bulkheads that were 16.5 inches (419 mm) thick above water and 13.5 inches (343 mm) below. The armoured deck was 3 inches (76 mm) thick from bow to stern. The turrets were protected by compound armour plates 16 to 14 inches (406 to 356 mm) thick and 12-inch (305 mm) plates defended the conning tower.

== Construction and career ==
Ajax, the fourth ship of her name to serve in the Royal Navy, was named for the mythological hero. The ship was laid down on 21 March 1876 in No. 4 Slipway, Pembroke Dockyard, Wales, and was launched on 10 March 1880 by Mrs. George Parkin, wife of the dockyard's Captain-Superintendent. She was completed on 30 March 1883 at a cost of £548,393.

Ajax was not commissioned until 30 April 1885 and was assigned to the Particular Service Squadron commanded by Admiral Geoffrey Hornby. That summer, the squadron evaluated the weapons and defences of a fortified harbour, Berehaven (now Castletownbere), Ireland, against torpedo boats and other threats. In August 1885, when tensions with Russia had subsided, she was posted as guard ship at Greenock. Ajax accidentally collided with the turret ship Devastation in 1887 off Portland. The latter had one compartment below water holed, but Ajax only received two holes in her bow.

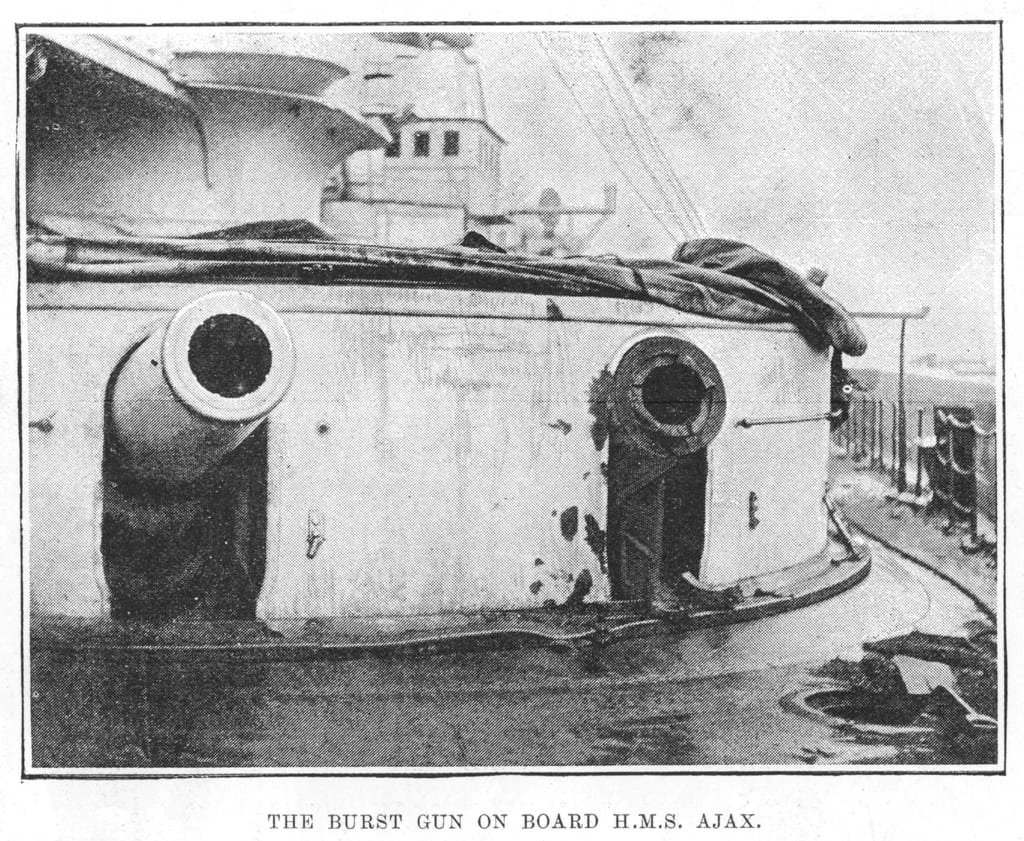
The Burst Gun on board HMS Ajax. Illustrated London News 1889

The ship participated in the annual manoeuvres in August 1889 and a shell exploded in one of her 12.5-inch gun barrels on 2 September, wounding one man. The ship was reduced to reserve at Chatham Dockyard in 1891. Her BL six-inch, 80-pounder guns were replaced by QF six-inch guns in 1897. She was further reduced to Dockyard Reserve in November 1901, and was sold to Castles for scrap in March 1904 and subsequently broken up at Charlton.
