= Russian cruiser Vladimir Monomakh =

Russian armoured cruiser

Coordinates: 34°32′N 129°40′E

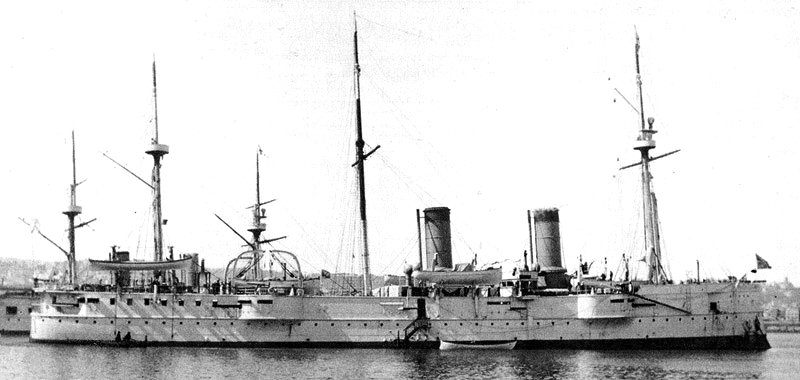
- Vladimir Monomakh after her 1892–93 refit

History

Russian Empire
- Name: Vladimir Monomakh
- Namesake: Vladimir II Monomakh
- Builder: Baltic Works, Saint Petersburg, Russia
- Cost: 3,348,847 rubles
- Laid down: 22 February 1881 (Note: All dates used in this article are New Style)
- Launched: 22 October 1882
- Completed: 13 July 1883
- Stricken: 28 September 1905
- Fate: Scuttled at the Battle of Tsushima, 28 May 1905

General characteristics as built
- Type: Armoured cruiser
- Displacement: 5,593 long tons (5,683 t)
- Length: 296 ft 3 in (90.3 m)
- Beam: 52 ft 0 in (15.85 m)
- Draught: 26 ft 3 in (8 m)
- Installed power: 7,000 ihp (5,200 kW)
- Propulsion: 2 shafts, 2 Compound steam engines; 6 cylindrical boilers
- Speed: 15.2 knots (28.2 km/h; 17.5 mph)
- Range: 6,200 nmi (11,500 km; 7,100 mi) at 10 knots (19 km/h; 12 mph)
- Complement: 591
- Armament: 4 × single 8 in (203 mm) guns; 12 × single 6 in (152 mm) guns; 4 × single 9-pounder guns; 10 × single Hotchkiss guns; 3 × 381 mm (15 in) torpedo tubes (above waterline)
- Armour: Compound armour; Belt: 9–4.75 in (229–121 mm); Deck: 3 in (76 mm); Battery: 3–4 in (76–102 mm)

Vladimir Monomakh (Russian: Владимир Мономах) was an armoured cruiser built for the Imperial Russian Navy during the 1880s. The vessel was named after Vladimir II Monomakh, Grand Prince of Kiev. She spent most of her career in the Far East, although the ship was in the Baltic Sea when the Russo-Japanese War began in 1904. Vladimir Monomakh was assigned to the Third Pacific Squadron and participated in the Battle of Tsushima in May 1905. She was tasked to protect the Russian transports and was not heavily engaged during the daylight portion of the battle. The ship was torpedoed during the night and was scuttled the following morning by her captain to prevent her capture by the Japanese.

== Design and description ==
Vladimir Monomakh was classified as a semi-armored frigate and was an improved version of the preceding Minin. The ship was designed with high endurance and high speed to facilitate her role as a commerce raider able to outrun enemy battleships. She was laid out as a central battery ironclad with the armament concentrated amidships. The iron-hulled ship was fitted with a ram and was sheathed in wood and copper to reduce fouling. The ship's hull was subdivided by ten transverse bulkheads and she had a double bottom 1.73 metres (5 ft 8 in) deep. Her crew numbered approximately 550 officers and men. Vladimir Monomakh was 307 feet 9 inches (93.8 m) long overall. She had a beam of 51 feet 10 inches (15.8 m) and a draft of 25 feet (7.6 m). The ship displaced 5,593 long tons (5,683 t) at deep load.

The ship had two vertical compound steam engines, each driving a four-bladed, manganese-bronze 18-foot (5.5 m) propeller. Steam was provided by six cylindrical boilers at a pressure of 70 psi (483 kPa; 5 kgf/cm^{2}). The engines produced 7,044 indicated horsepower (5,253 kW) during sea trials which gave the ship a maximum speed around 15.8 knots (29.3 km/h; 18.2 mph). Vladimir Monomakh carried 900 long tons (910 t) of coal which gave her an economical range of 6,200 nautical miles (11,500 km; 7,100 mi) at a speed of 10 knots (19 km/h; 12 mph). She was ship rigged with three masts and had a total sail area of 26,000 square feet (2,400 m^{2}). To reduce drag while under sail, her funnels were retractable.

Vladimir Monomakh was armed with four 8-inch (203 mm) guns, one at each corner of the battery that were sponsoned out over the sides of the hull. Eight of the dozen 6-inch (152 mm) guns were mounted between the eight-inch guns in the central battery and the remaining four were outside the battery at the ends of the ship. Anti-torpedo boat defence was provided by four 9-pounder and ten Hotchkiss guns. The ship was also equipped with three above-water 15-inch (381 mm) torpedo tubes.

The ship's waterline belt was composed of compound armour and extended the full length of the ship. It was six inches thick amidships, but reduced to 4.5 inches (114 mm) at the ship's ends. It extended 2 feet (0.6 m) above the waterline and 4 feet (1.2 m) below. Transverse bulkheads 3–4 inches (76–102 mm) thick protected the guns in the battery from raking fire. The sponsons of the 8-inch guns were equally thick. The protective deck was 0.5-inch (13 mm) thick.

== Career ==
Construction began on Vladimir Monomakh on 22 February 1881 at the Baltic Works in St. Petersburg, although the formal keel-laying ceremony was not held until 21 May. She was launched on 22 October 1882 and completed on 13 July 1883. The ship's total cost was 3,348,847 rubles. Although the second vessel to be laid down in the Dmitri Donskoy class, Vladimir Monomakh was completed first. Due to constant changes during construction, the design of both vessels diverged considerably by the time of completion. The ship was named after Vladimir II Monomakh, Grand Prince of Kiev.

On 11 October 1884, Vladimir Monomakh began a leisurely voyage from the Baltic Sea to the Far East. She made port visits in Kristiansand, Norway and Portland Harbour, England before reaching Malta on 25 November. The ship spent most of the next six weeks in Greek waters before arriving at Port Said, Egypt on 12 January 1885 to transit the Suez Canal. Vladimir Monomakh encountered the British ironclad battleship HMS Agamemnon there and was followed by her all the way to Japan as tensions were rising between Great Britain and Russia in early 1885. The ship arrived in Nagasaki in March 1885 and was appointed flagship of the Russian Pacific Fleet under Rear Admiral A.E. Kroun. Based out of Vladivostok, she normally wintered in warmer waters. For example, Vladimir Monomakh visited Manila, Singapore, Hong Kong, Batavia, Dutch East Indies and Penang Island between November 1885 and March 1886. She returned to Kronstadt in 1887 and was refitted in 1888.

Vladimir Monomakh departed Kronstadt for the Mediterranean on 6 November 1889 where she remained for the next year. She joined the official escort for the Tsarevich Nicholas II's visit to the Far East. The Tsarevich travelled aboard the Pamiat Azova and Vladimir Monomakh provided protection. The two ships reached Singapore on 2 March 1891, and reached Vladivostok on 23 May. Once at Vladivostok, Captain Oskar Stark was appointed commander of the ship and Vladimir Monomakh was overhauled through August. She wintered over again at Nagasaki, departing for Europe on 23 April 1892 and reached Kronstadt in August, where the ship was given a thorough refit beginning on 22 September. The heavy sailing rig was replaced by three signal masts, her funnels were fixed in place, and her boilers were also upgraded. Vladimir Monomakh was reclassified as a 1st Class Cruiser on 13 February 1892.

On 2 October 1894 the ship, now under the command of Captain Zinovy Rozhestvensky, was ordered back to the Mediterranean. In view of the First Sino-Japanese War of 1894–95, the Council of Ministers ordered on 1 February 1895 that the Mediterranean Squadron reinforce the 2nd Pacific Squadron. She reached the Chinese treaty port of Chefoo on 16 April and became the flagship of Rear Admiral Yevgeni Ivanovich Alekseyev, 2nd in command of the Pacific Fleet, on 13 May. Vladimir Monomakh remained at Chefoo until late in the year before sailing to Vladivostok and then to Kobe, Japan in January 1896.

The ship only remained there for a short time before she was ordered back to Kronstadt for a major modernization. Her obsolete 8-inch and 6-inch guns were replaced with five new 45-calibre 6-inch and six 120-millimetre (4.7 in) Canet guns. The ship's six original boilers were replaced by a dozen cylindrical boilers.

Vladimir Monomakh was transferred back to the Pacific Fleet in November 1897 and reached Nagasaki in February 1898. After the Triple Intervention expelled the Japanese from Port Arthur, Vladimir Monomakh was part of the Russian force which subsequently occupied that strategic harbor. In June 1900, she transported troops involved in the suppression of the Boxer Rebellion. In September 1900, on her return to Port Arthur, she accidentally rammed and sank the merchant vessel Crown of Aragon. In December 1901, she rendezvoused with Dmitri Donskoy at Hong Kong, and the two ships returned to the Mediterranean via the Suez Canal. Vladimir Monomakh remained in the Mediterranean until August 1902, and reached Kronstadt in October. In 1903–04 some of her 47-millimetre (1.9 in) Hotchkiss guns were replaced by 75-millimetre (3.0 in).

=== Russo-Japanese War ===
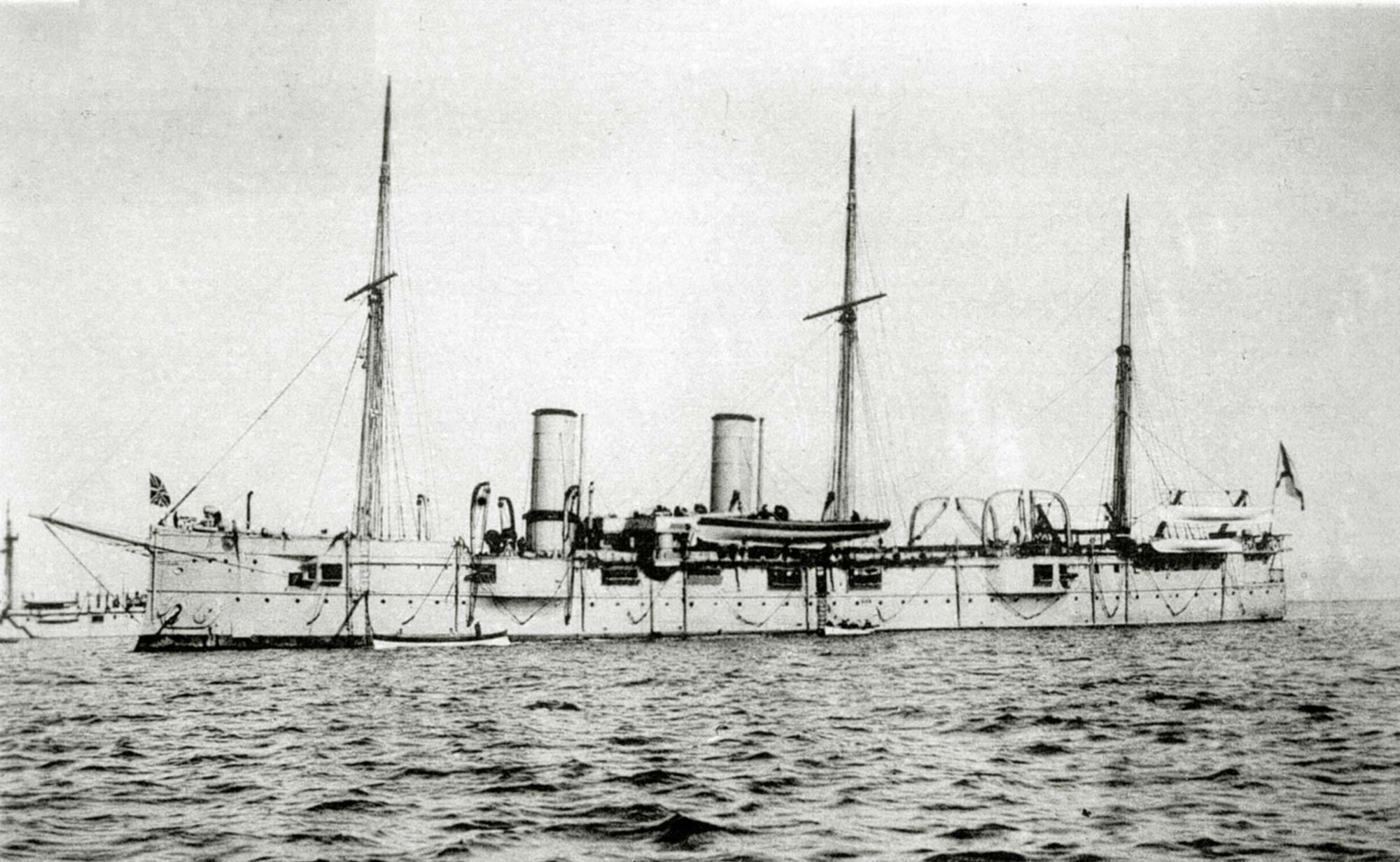
Vladimir Monomakh between 1893 and 1905

In February 1905, Vladimir Monomakh was assigned to the Third Pacific Squadron, which was sent to reinforce Admiral Zinovy Rozhestvensky's Second Pacific Squadron. The Third Pacific Squadron transited the Suez Canal and joined the 2nd Pacific Squadron at Cam Ranh Bay in French Indochina on 14 May 1905 where she was assigned to the Cruiser Division commanded by Rear Admiral Oskar Enkvist.

At the decisive Battle of Tsushima on 27 May 1905, Vladimir Monomakh was positioned to the right side of the Russian line of battle, guarding the transports and so avoided the pounding that the other vessels of Second Pacific Squadron received, although she engaged the Japanese cruiser Izumi. The Japanese ship was hit several times and driven off, but only three crewmen were killed and seven wounded. Vladimir Monomakh was hit several times itself and had one 120 mm gun destroyed and its crew killed. The most dangerous hit was a shell that burst over a 6-inch shell hoist and started an ammunition fire. The prompt flooding of the magazine averted an explosion.

At nightfall, the Japanese torpedo boats engaged the surviving Russian warships and the cruiser claimed to have sunk one of her attackers at 8:25 p.m. Vladimir Monomakh, mistaking one of her attackers for a Russian destroyer, was hit around 8:40 by a single torpedo which ruptured her hull near the No. 2 coal bunker, but sank the torpedo boat. The damage was severe but her crew kept her afloat and her engines operational, although she continued to take on water. The next morning, however, Vladimir Monomakh headed towards Tsushima Island and began to unload her wounded into her surviving boats. Captain Vladimir Aleksandrovich Popov gave the order to abandon ship, and ordered the seacocks to be opened to scuttle the vessel rather than surrender it to the Japanese. The ship sank at 10:20 a.m. and the crew was captured by the Japanese auxiliary cruisers IJN Sado Maru and IJN Manshū. Vladimir Monomakh was officially removed from the navy list on 28 September 1905.
