= RML 12.5-inch 38-ton gun =

Ordnance RML 12.5-inch 38-ton gun
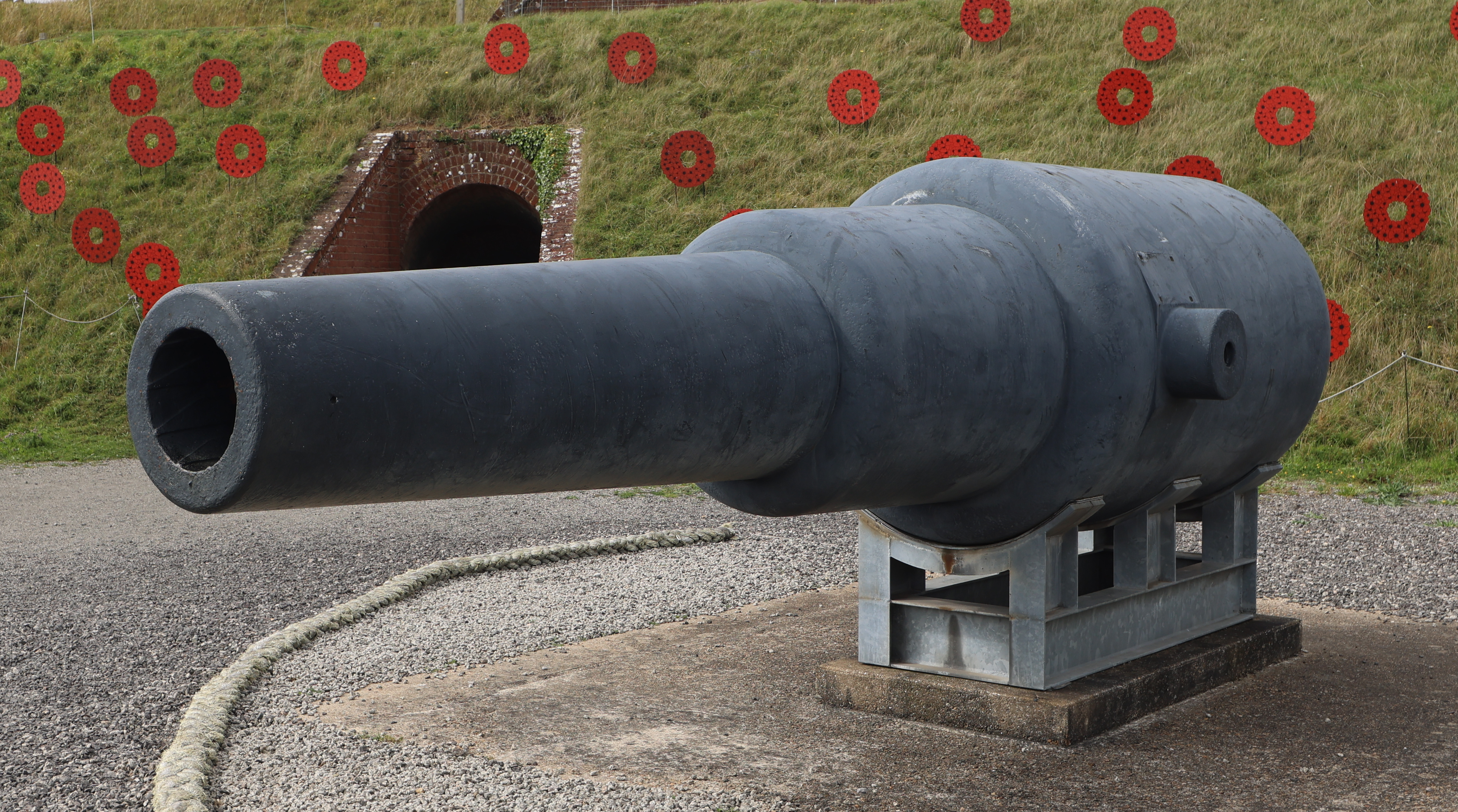
- Gun at Fort Nelson, Portsmouth, UK
- Type: Naval gun Coast defence gun
- Place of origin: United Kingdom

Service history
- In service: 1875–1905
- Used by: Royal Navy

Production history
- Designer: Royal Gun Factory
- Designed: 1874
- Manufacturer: Royal Arsenal
- Variants: Mk I, Mk II

Specifications
- Barrel length: 198 inches (5.0 m) (bore)
- Shell: 800 to 809 pounds (362.9 to 367.0 kg) Palliser, Common, Shrapnel
- Calibre: 12.5-inch (317.5 mm)
- Muzzle velocity: Mk I : 1,425 feet per second (434 m/s); Mk II : 1,575 feet per second (480 m/s)
- Maximum firing range: Mk I : 6,000 yards (5,500 m); Mk II : 6,500 yards (5,900 m)

The RML 12.5-inch guns were large rifled muzzle-loading guns designed for British battleships and were also employed for coast defence.

== Design ==
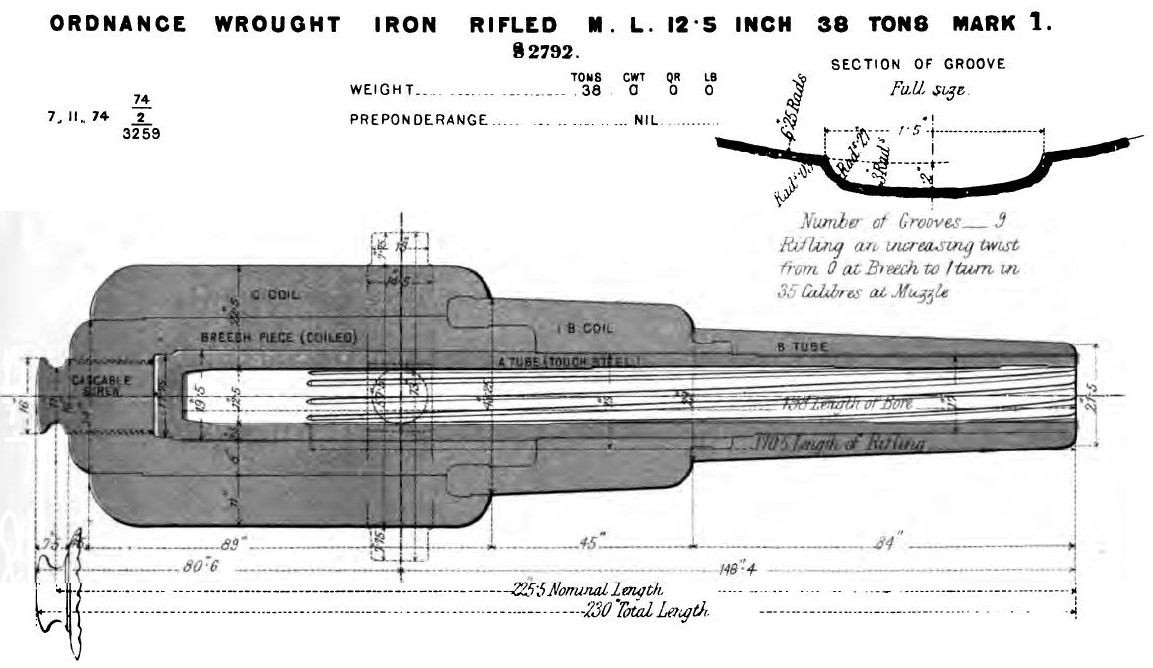
Mark I gun barrel construction

The gun originated from a desire for a longer 12 in (30 cm) gun than the existing RML 12-inch 35-ton gun. Experiments in 1874 with both 12 in (30 cm) and 12.5 in (32 cm) versions 3 ft (91 cm) longer than the existing 12 in (30 cm) gun showed the 12.5 in (32 cm) calibre was more suitable, and further experiments showed a projectile of 800 lb (360 kg) could be fired with a charge of 130 lb (59 kg) of P2 gunpowder without undue strain. The same construction as in the existing 12 in (30 cm) 35-ton gun was used : a mild steel "A" tube toughened in oil, surrounded by wrought iron "B" tube, triple coil in front of the trunnion, coiled breech-piece and breech coil. This was approved in January 1875.

The gun was rifled on the "Woolwich" pattern of a small number of broad shallow rounded grooves, with 9 grooves increasing from 0 to 1 turn in 35 calibres (i.e. 1 turn in 437.5 in (1,111 cm)).

Mark II had an enlarged powder chamber and attained higher muzzle velocity and slightly longer range.

This gun was the final development of large British rifled muzzle-loading guns before it switched to breechloaders beginning in 1880. It was succeeded in its class on new battleships by the BL 12 in (30 cm) Mk II gun.

== Naval service ==
Guns were mounted on HMS Dreadnought commissioned in 1879, HMS Agamemnon commissioned in 1883, and HMS Ajax commissioned in 1885, the last British warships completed with muzzle-loading guns.

== Ammunition ==
When the gun was first introduced projectiles had several rows of "studs" which engaged with the gun's rifling to impart spin. Sometime after 1878, "attached gas-checks" were fitted to the bases of the studded shells, reducing wear on the guns and improving their range and accuracy. Subsequently, "automatic gas-checks" were developed which could rotate shells, allowing the deployment of a new range of studless ammunition.

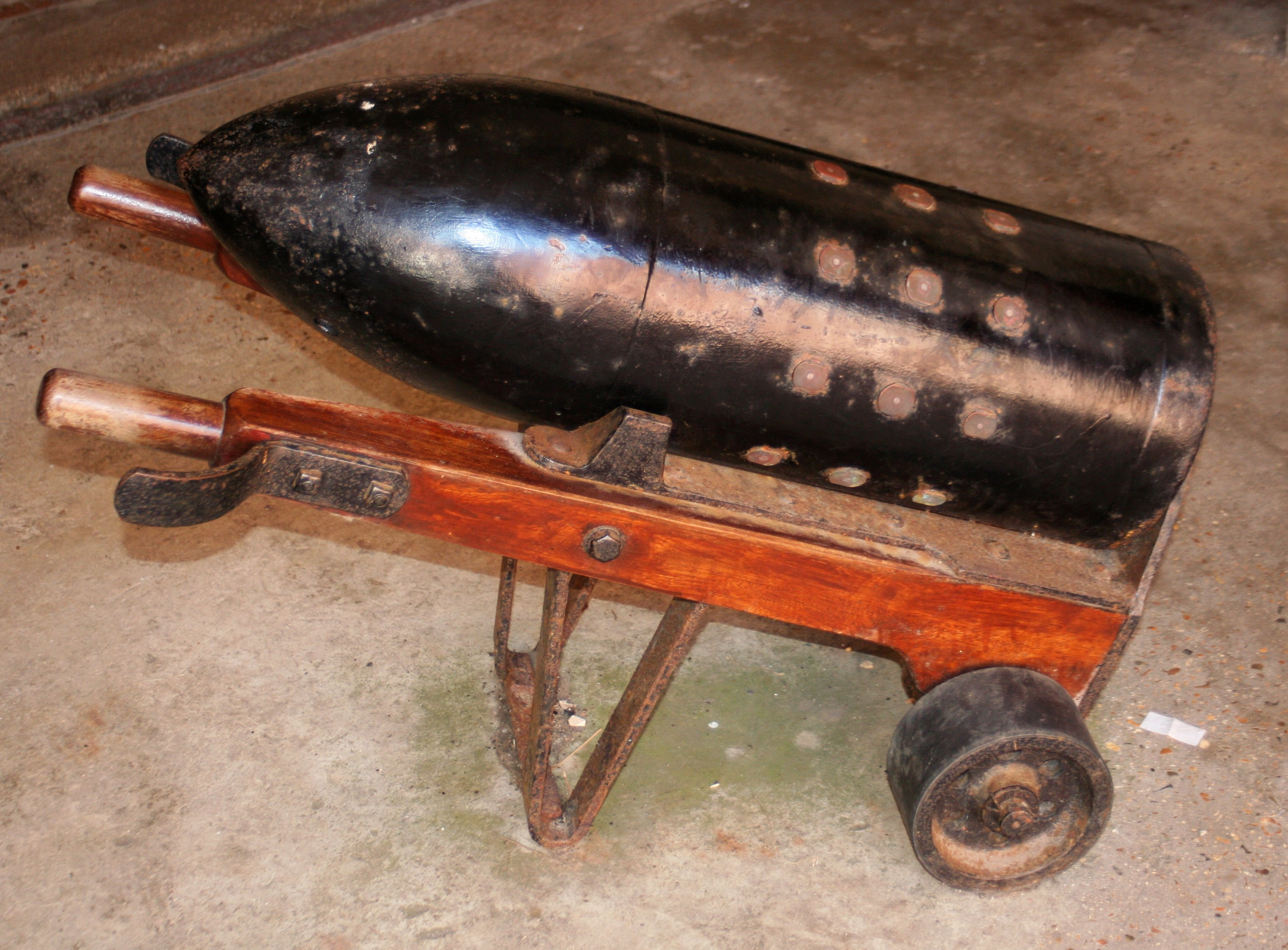
1

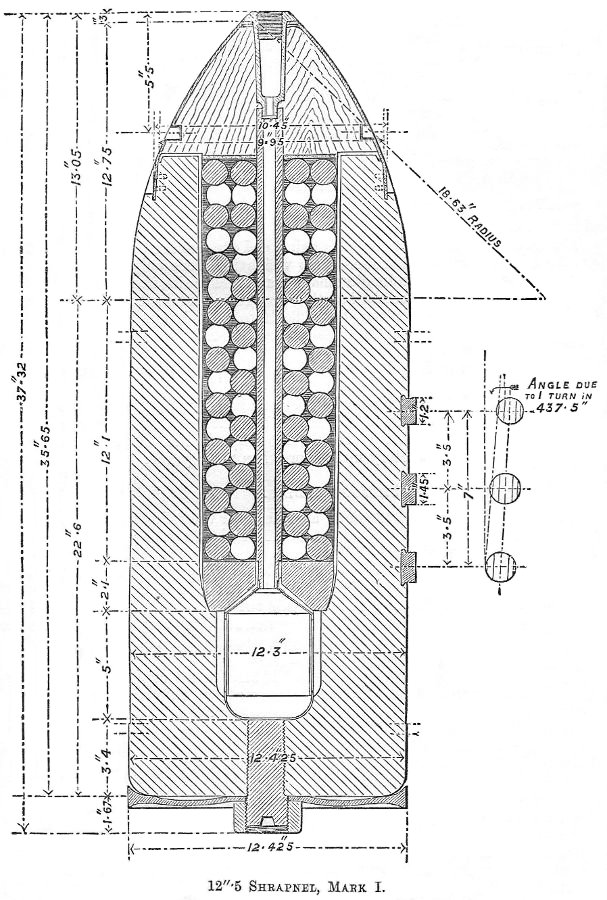
2

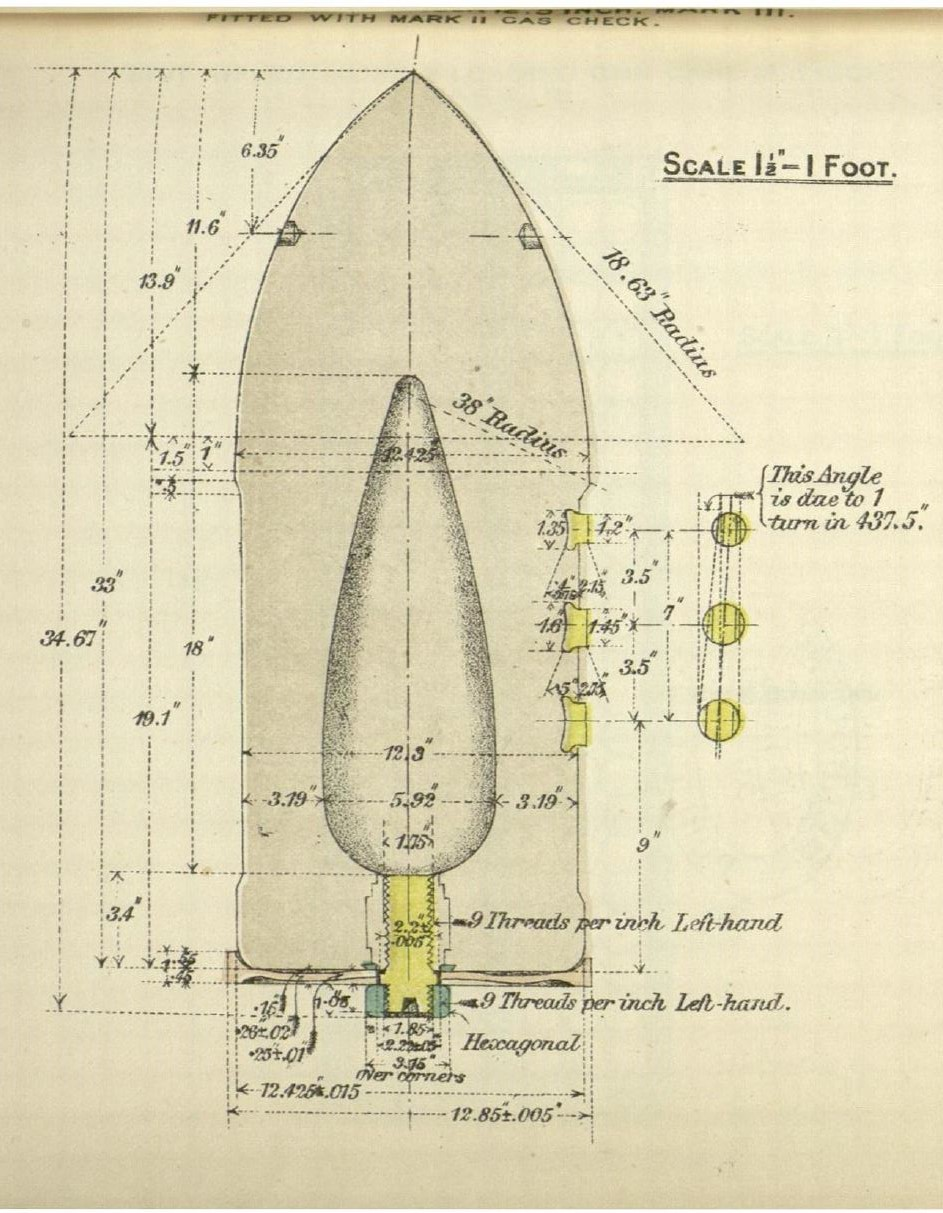
3

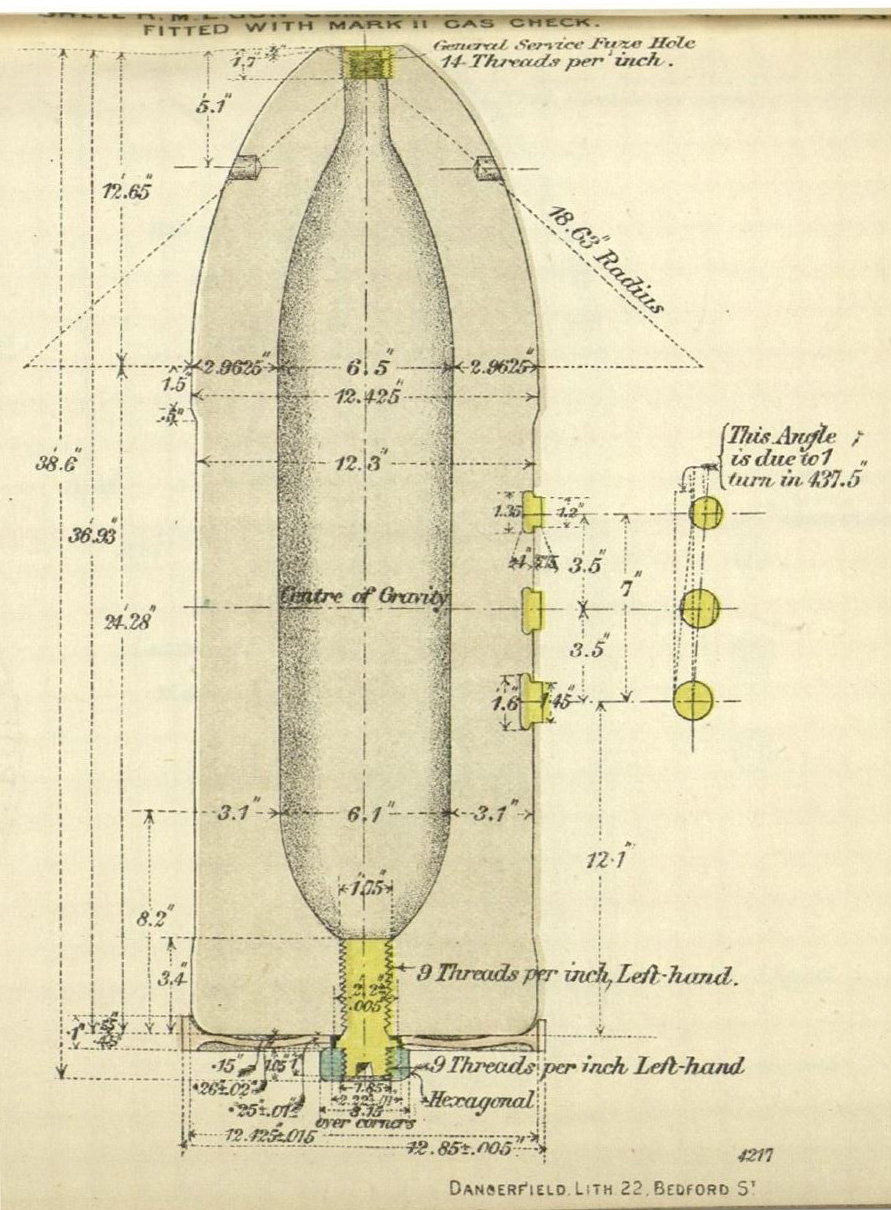
4

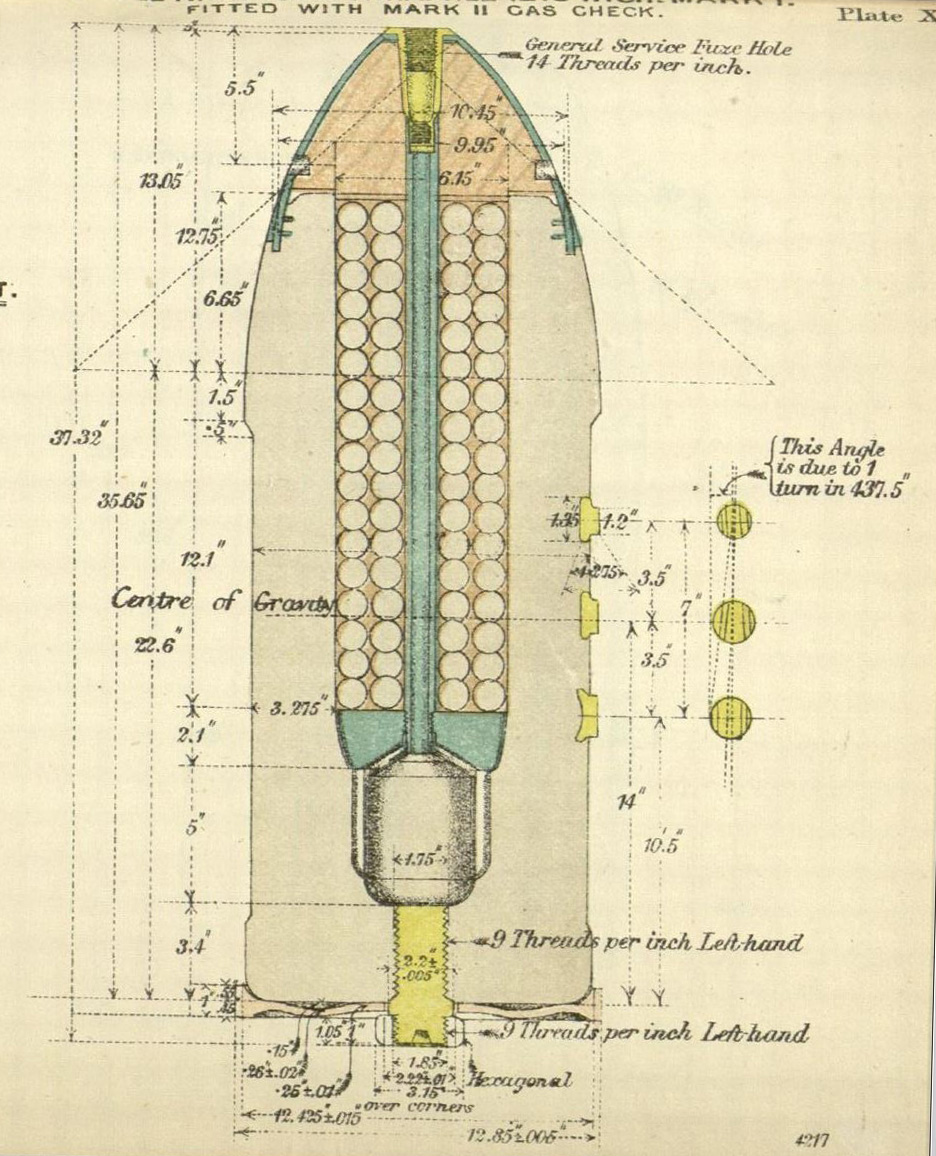
5

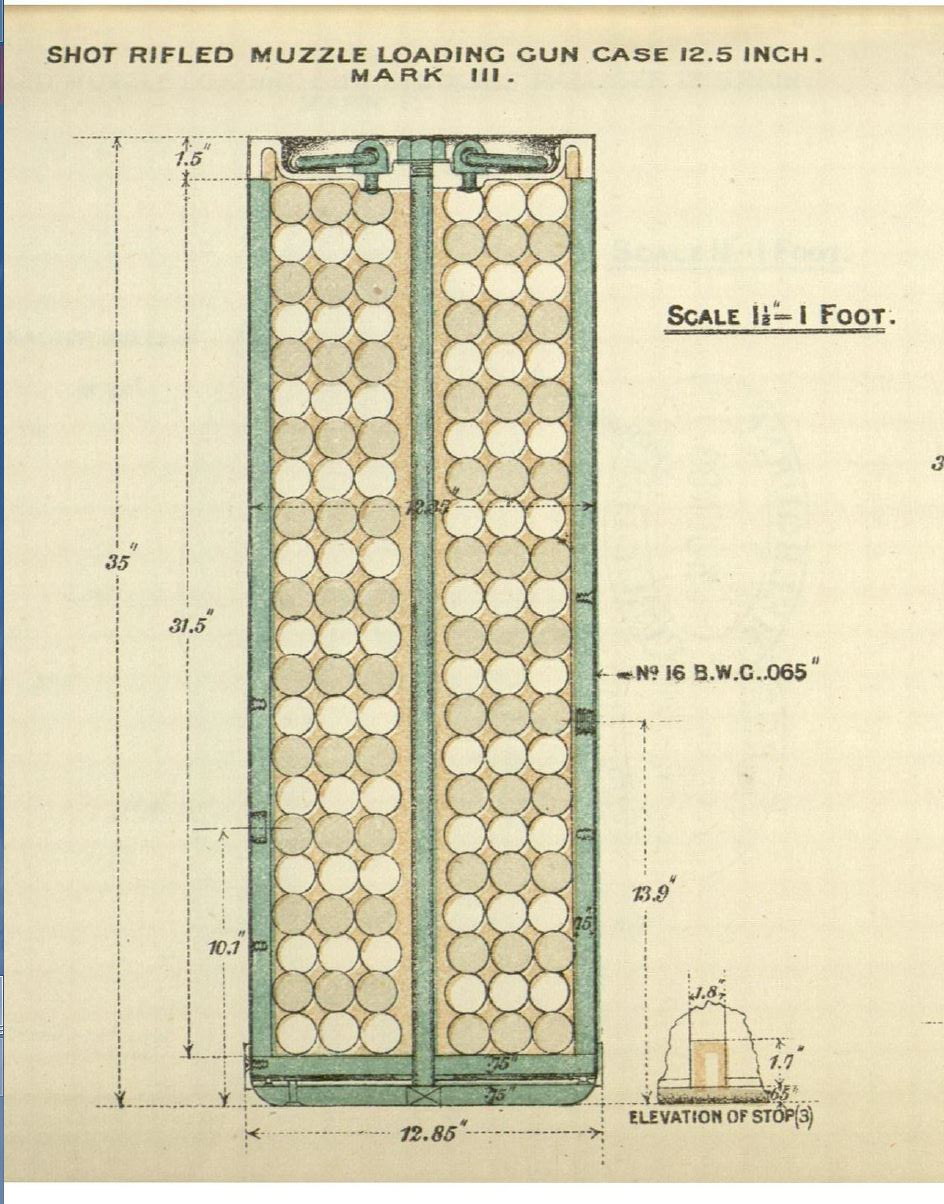
6

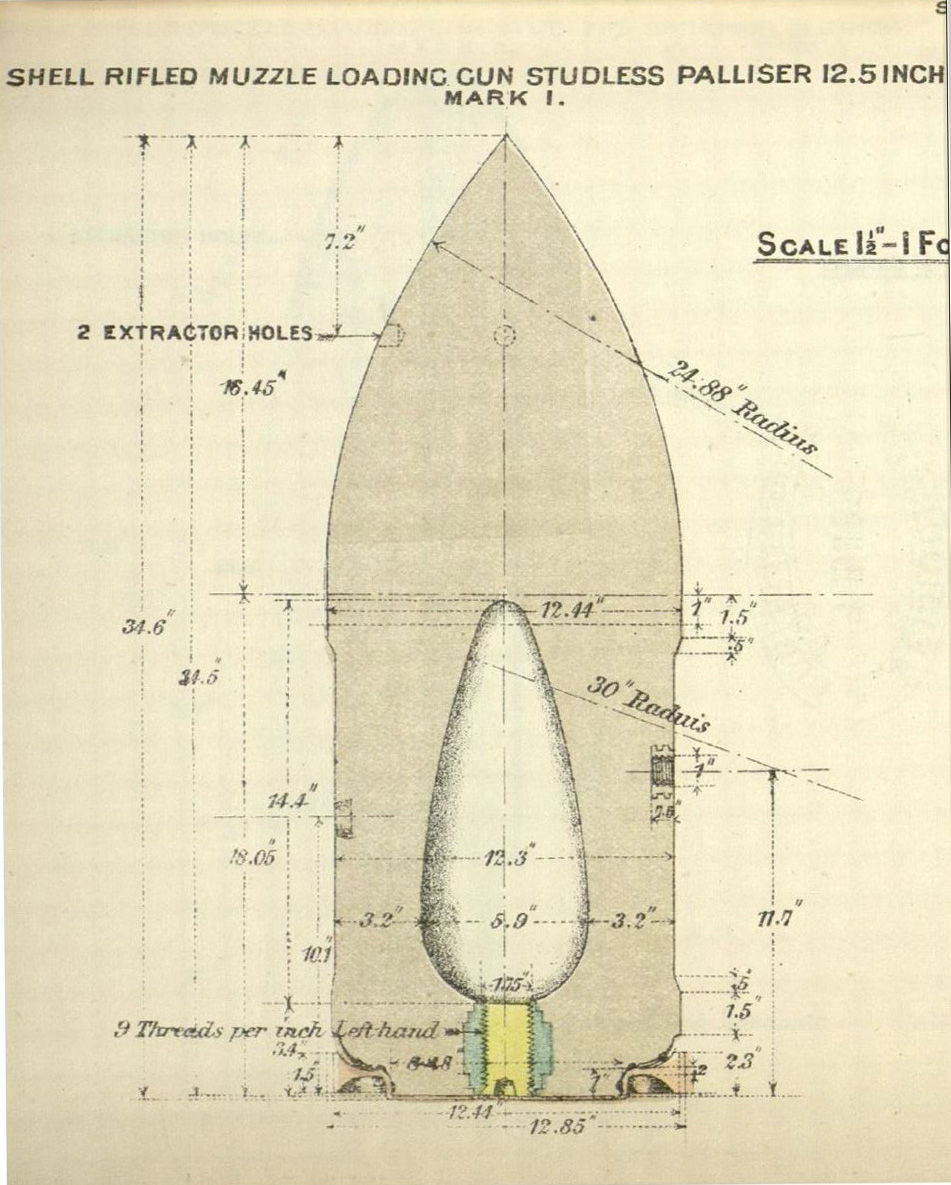
7

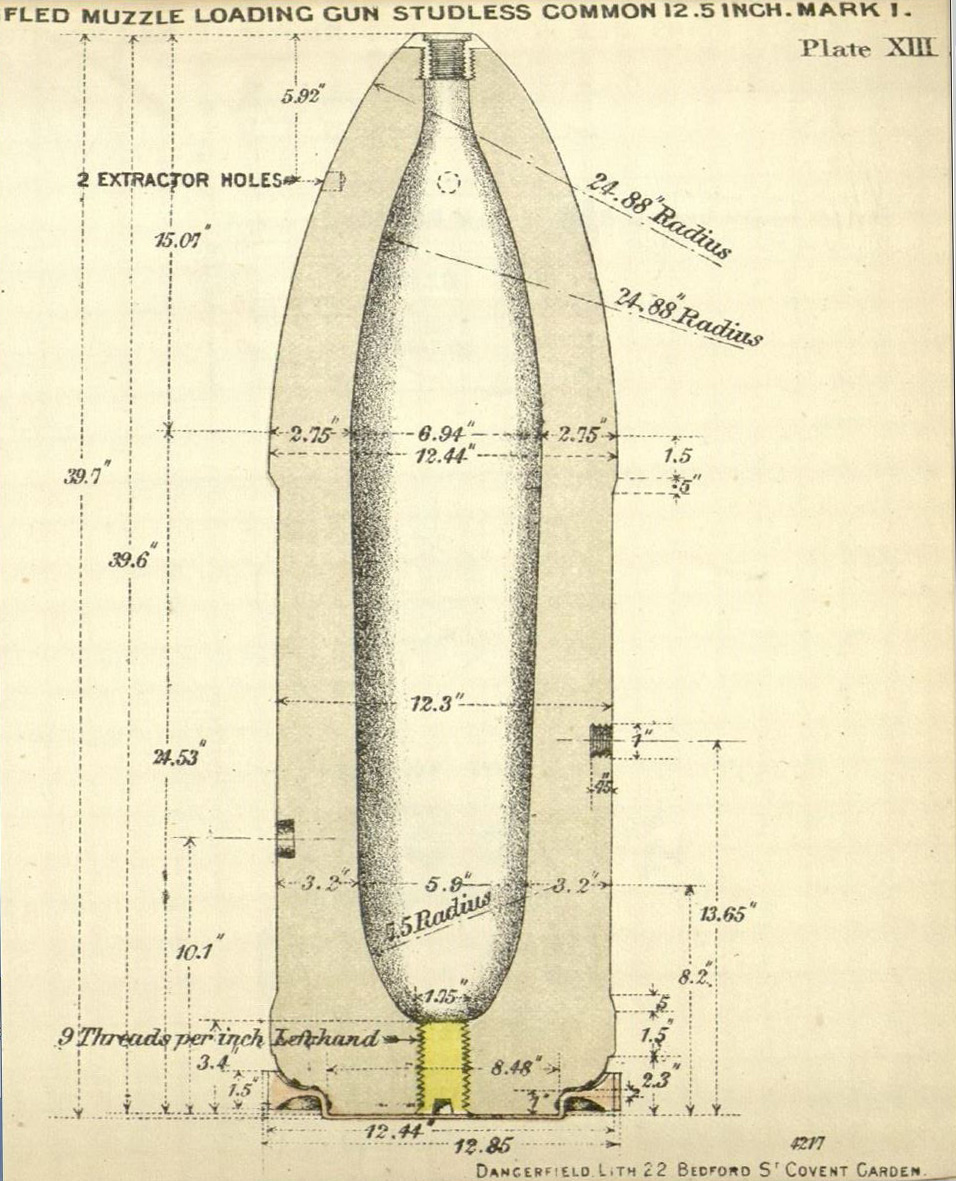
8

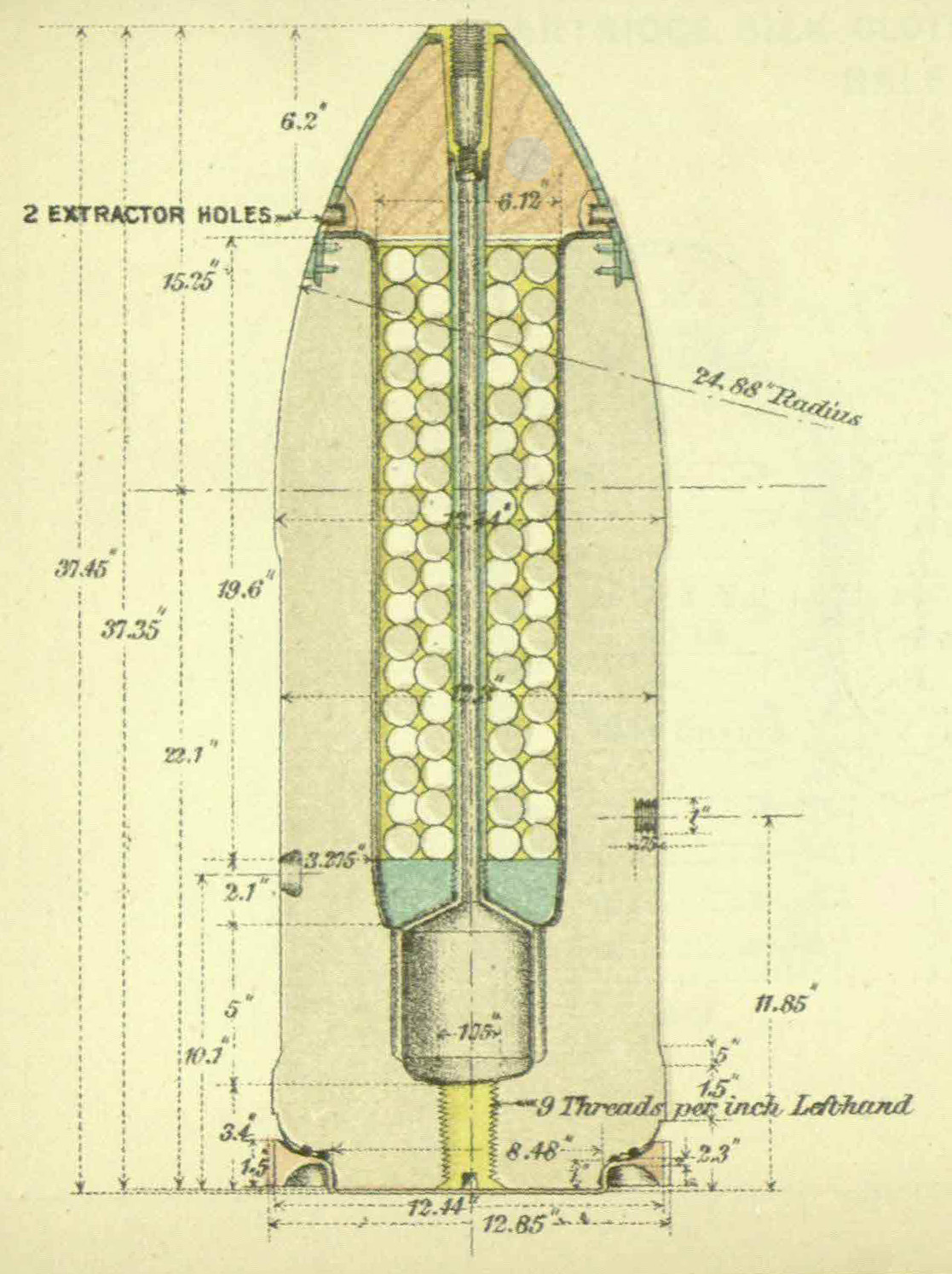
9
1. RML 12.5in Studded Shell, located at Hurst Castle, UK
2. RML 12.5in Studded Shrapnel Shell Mk I with Attached Gas-Check Mk I
3. RML 12.5in Studded Palliser Shell Mk III with Attached Gas-Check Mk II
4. RML 12.5in Studded Common Shell Mk I with Attached Gas-Check Mk II
5. RML 12.5in Studded Shrapnel Shell Mk I with Attached Gas-check Mk II
6. RML 12.5in Case Shot Mk III
7. RML 12.5in Studless Palliser Shell Mk I with Automatic Gas-Check
8. RML 12.5in Studless Common Shell Mk I with Automatic Gas-Check
9. RML 12.5in Studless Shrapnel Shell Mk I with Automatic Gas-check

Images 3–9 show the range of ammunition for the RML 12.5-inch gun in 1885. By this time the gun no longer fired studded ammunition without gas-checks. Instead there were two sets of ammunition available, namely: older studded ammunition with attached gas-checks Mk II, and newer studless ammunition with automatic gas-checks. Case ammunition neither was studded nor required gas-checks. Also by this time, attached gas-checks Mk I as shown in image 2 had been superseded by attached gas-checks Mk II.

== See also ==
- List of naval guns

== Surviving examples ==
- Two at Hurst Castle, UK, originally at Cliff End Battery
- At Fort Nelson, Portsmouth, UK, originally at Cliff End Battery
- Outside Fort Albert, Isle of Wight
- No 22 of 1876 outside Calbourne Mill, Isle of Wight, originally at Cliff End Battery
- An unpreserved gun at Fort Delimara, Malta
- Gun on replica carriage at Harding's Battery, Gibraltar
- Gun number 87 and 95, dated 1878. Now in the ditch at Fort Cunningham, Bermuda

== Bibliography ==
- Treatise on the construction and manufacture of ordnance in the British service. War Office, UK, 1877
- Text Book of Gunnery, 1887. LONDON : PRINTED FOR HIS MAJESTY'S STATIONERY OFFICE, BY HARRISON AND SONS, ST. MARTIN'S LANE
- Sectretary of State for War (1885). Handbook for the R.M.L. 12.5-inch 38-ton Gun, Marks I and II. London: Her Majesty's Stationery Office.
