= Colossus-class ironclad =

1882 class of British ironclads

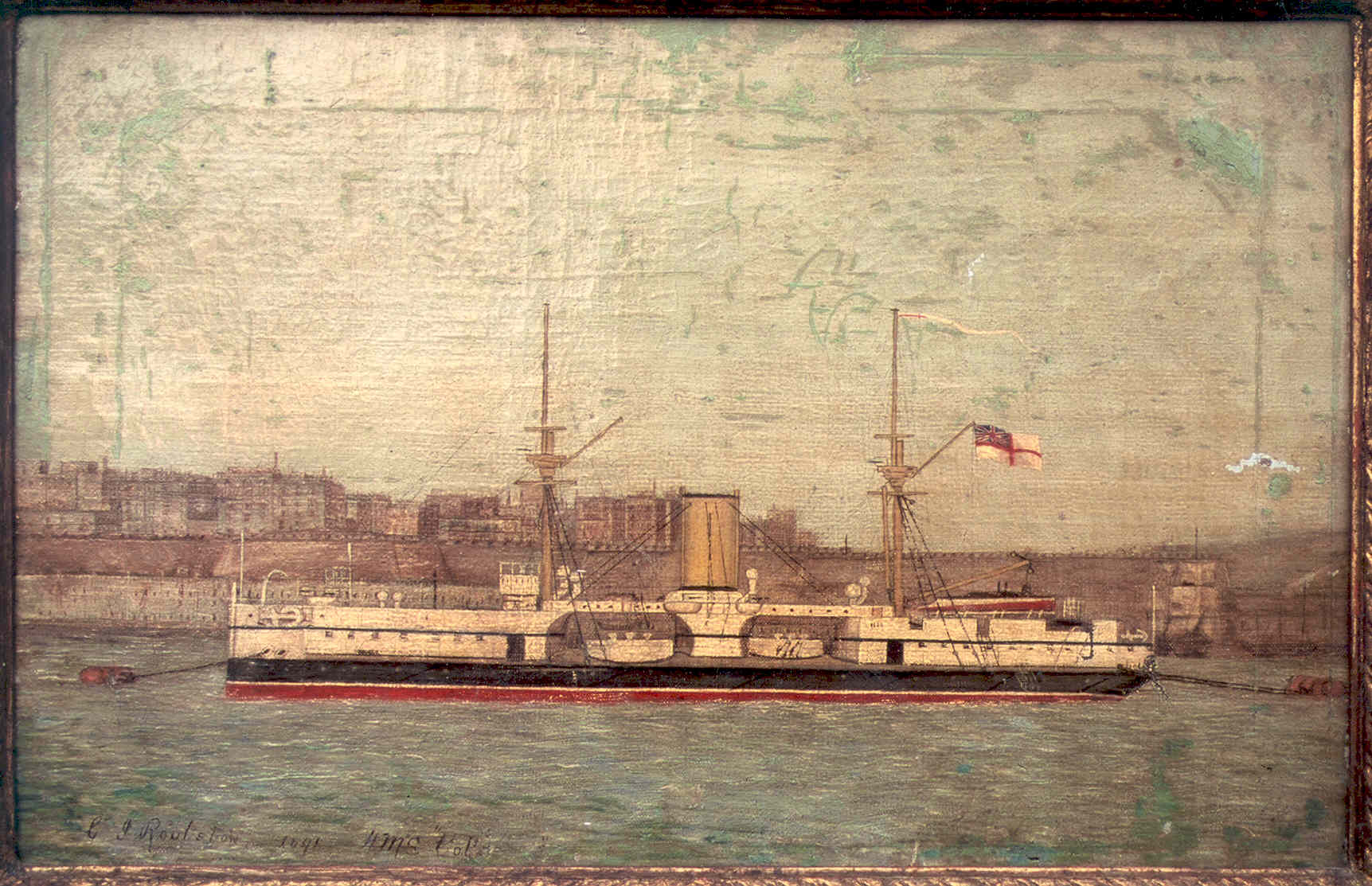
- HMS Colossus, lead ship of the class, painted in 1891, Malta

Class overview
- Builders: Portsmouth Dockyard, Pembroke Dockyard
- Operators: Royal Navy
- Preceded by: Ajax class
- Succeeded by: Admiral class
- In commission: 1882–1910
- Completed: 2
- Retired: 2

General characteristics
- Displacement: 9,420 tons
- Length: 325 ft (99 m) pp
- Beam: 68 ft (21 m)
- Draught: 25 ft 9 in (7.85 m)
- Propulsion: 2-shaft Maudslay engine, 7,488 ihp (5,584 kW)
- Speed: 16.5 knots (30.6 km/h)
- Armament: 4 × BL 12 in (305 mm) guns; 5 × BL 6 in (152 mm) guns; 20 smaller guns; 2 × 14-inch torpedo tubes
- Armour: Citadel: 14–18 inches; Bulkheads: 13–16 inches; Deck: 2.5–3 inches; Conning Tower: 14 inches (356 mm); Turrets: 16-inch faces, 14-inch sides and rear

The Colossus-class battleships were British ironclad warships, carrying their main armament in turrets, which served in the Royal Navy in the Victorian era. Entering into service in 1882. They were the first British warships to carry large rifled breech-loading main guns.

== Design ==
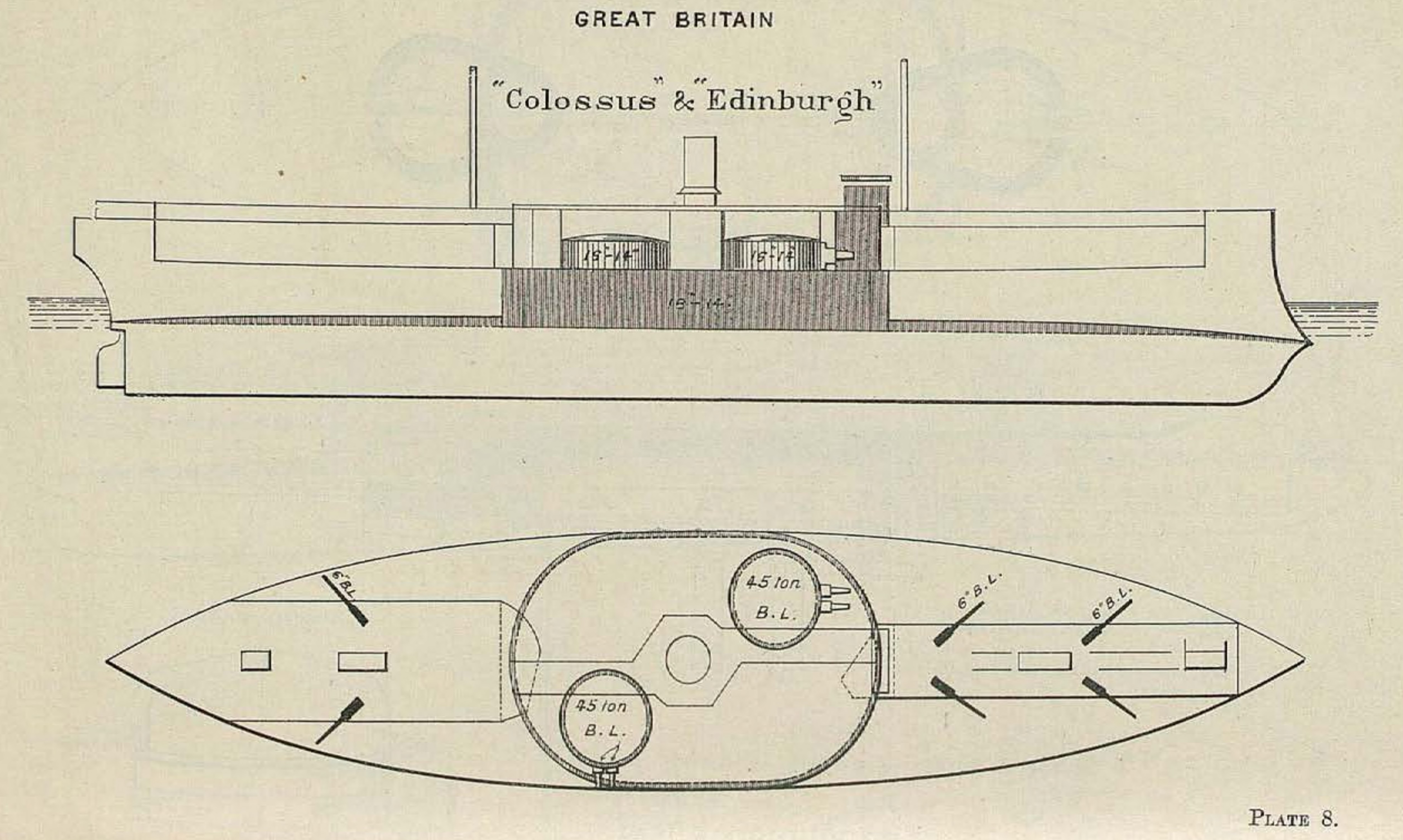
Right elevation and plan as depicted in Brassey's Naval Annual 1896

They were in all essential points improved versions of the Ajax class, with slightly greater displacement, protection and speed, with better handling characteristics, and most significantly, with breech-loading artillery replacing the obsolescent muzzle loaders. They also used steel rather than iron for most of the hull structure, and utilised the innovative compound armour for the belt and turrets.

The class was originally designed to carry the then-standard muzzle-loading artillery, while European navies had already for several years been equipped with breech-loading guns. At this time, for historical reasons, the Board of Admiralty was ultimately responsible for the designs of Royal Naval warships, but the War Office was responsible for the design and provision of naval artillery. In 1879, while the Colossus class was under construction, a 100-ton muzzle-loader was being tested at the Royal Arsenal, Woolwich, and the 16-inch 80-ton guns destined for HMS Inflexible were nearly complete. Responding to a groundswell of professional opinion, the Admiralty sent a group of senior officers to witness and report on the performance of the new breech-loading weapons being produced by Krupp in Essen. As a result of their report, Woolwich undertook the manufacture of 12 inch calibre breech-loaders, with a breech mechanism manufactured at Elswick. The Colossus class was nominated to be armed with these guns; the delay in their manufacture largely accounts for the protracted building times of these vessels.

Both ships did well on sea-trials, exceeding their design speed. They threw up what is described as a "remarkable bow wave, which rose like a solid wall for thirteen feet, the like of which has never been observed." They had a quick roll, and because of the low freeboard and the long chases of the guns, the gun muzzles dipped into the sea at a roll of 13° when trained on the beam. They were fitted with large bilge keels and with anti-rolling tanks.

They were both reported to be slow to respond to the helm, with large turning circles.

== Ships ==
Construction data
Ship	Builder	Laid down	Launched	Completed	Fate
Colossus	Portsmouth Dockyard	6 June 1879	21 March 1882	31 October 1886	Scrapped, October 1908
Edinburgh	Pembroke Dockyard	20 March 1879	18 March 1882	8 July 1887	Sunk as a target, 1908
