= Armored citadel =

Armored areas on warships

In a warship, an armored citadel is an armored box enclosing the machinery and magazine spaces formed by the armored deck, the waterline belt, and the transverse bulkheads. In many post-World War I warships, armor was concentrated in a very strong citadel, with the rest of the ship virtually unprotected, which was found to be the most effective defence; this is referred to as all or nothing armor.

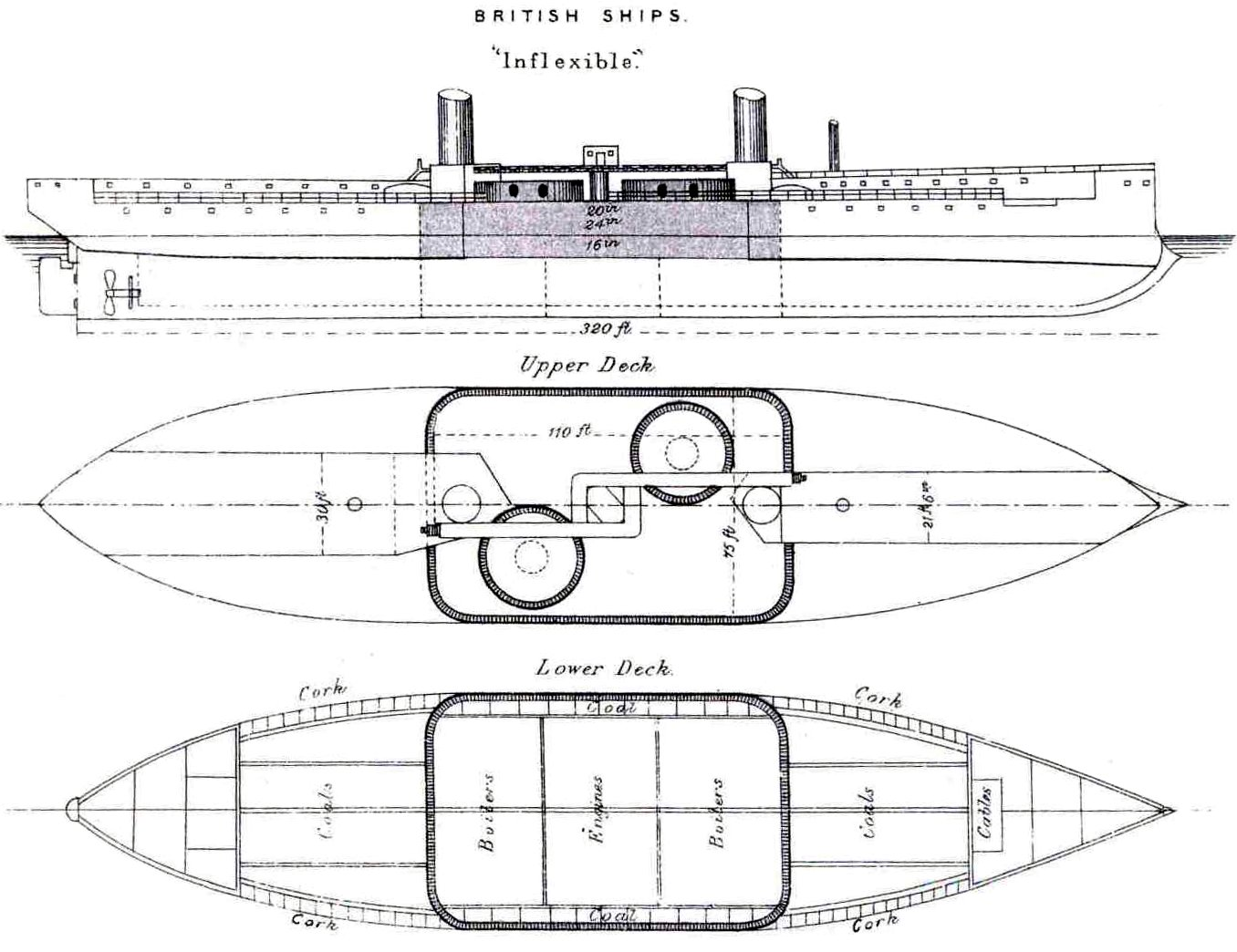
A schematic of HMS Inflexible depicting her rectangular citadel in the centre

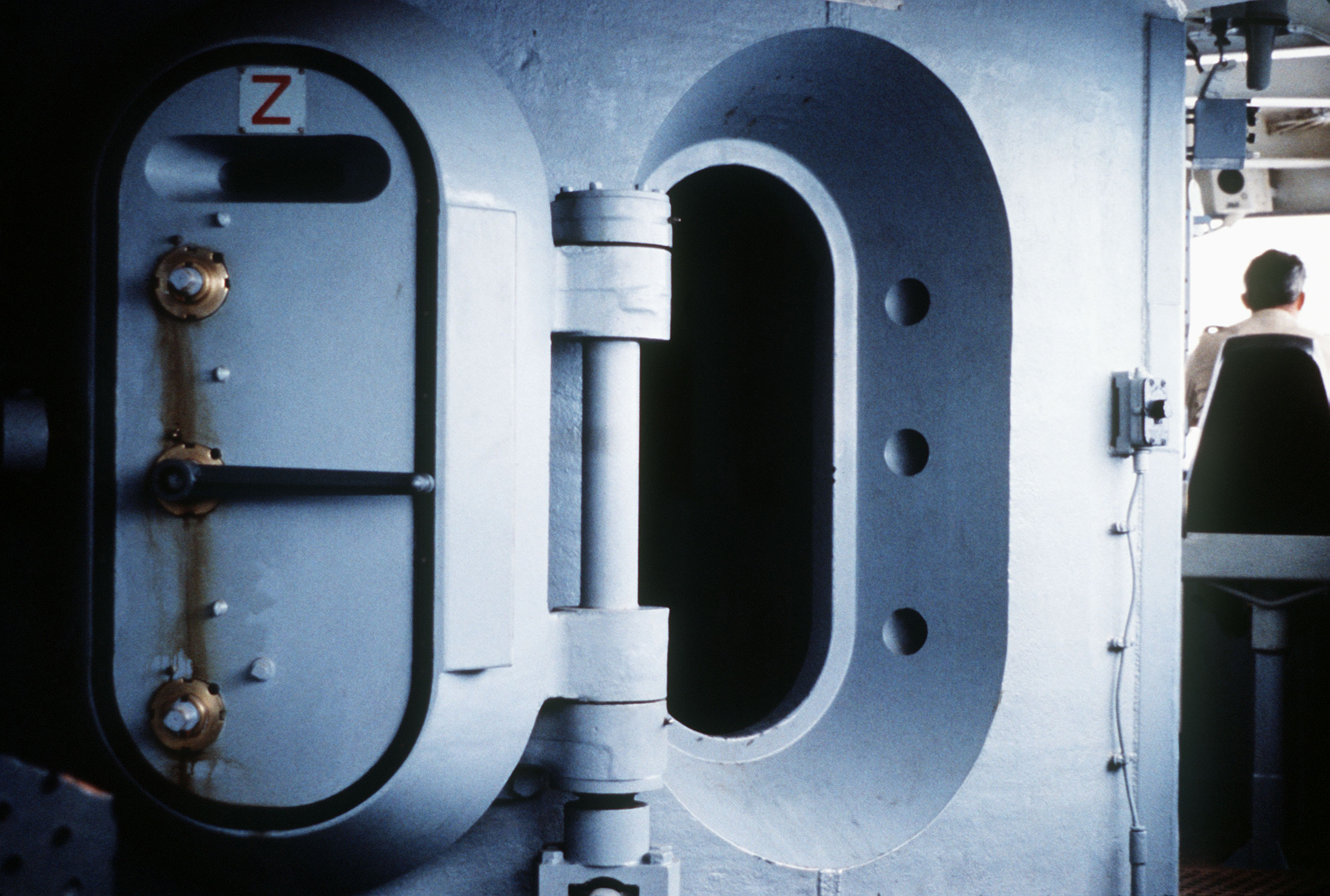
Citadel door on USS New Jersey

== All or nothing ==
In warships, the all or nothing technique on naval vessel armor is known for its use on dreadnought battleships. The concept entails strongly armoring the ship's most essential areas while leaving the remainder of the ship unarmored. The “all or nothing” strategy eliminated weak or moderate armor thicknesses: armor was utilized in the largest possible thickness or not at all, providing “either total or negligible protection”. Compared to prior armoring systems, “all or nothing” ships had heavier armor that covered a smaller area of the hull.

== See also ==
- Safe room

== Bibliography ==
- Raven, Alan; Roberts, John (1980). British Cruisers of World War Two. Annapolis, MD: Naval Institute Press. ISBN 0-87021-922-7.
