= 1st Hampshire Engineers =

1st Hampshire Engineers Hampshire Fortress Royal Engineers XIII Corps Troops Royal Engineers 115 Construction Regiment, RE
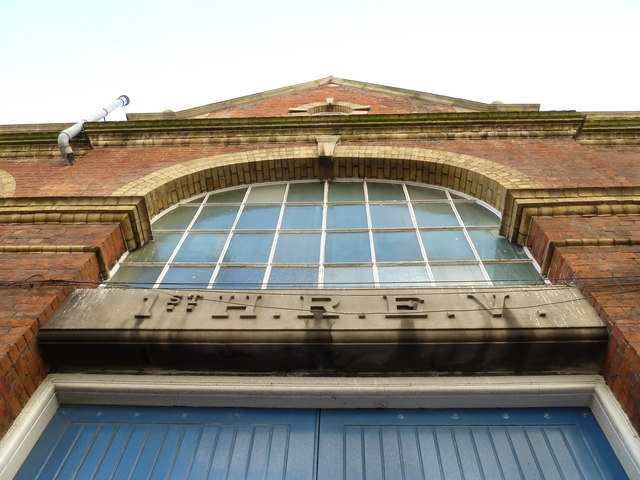
- Sign on the drill hall of the 1st Hampshire Royal Engineers Volunteers, Hampshire Terrace, Portsmouth
- Active: 1 April 1891 – 1967
- Country: United Kingdom
- Branch: Territorial Army
- Type: Fortress Engineers; Field Engineers
- Role: Coast Defence; Field Engineering
- Part of: Southern Coast Defences; XIII Corps
- Engagements: Second Boer War; World War I: Salonika; World War II: North Africa; El Alamein; Sicily; Italy

The 1st Hampshire Engineer Volunteer Corps was first formed in 1862 and then reformed in 1891 with special responsibility for the port defences of the South Coast of England. It carried out this role during World War I, as well as forming field units that served on the Western Front and at Salonika. Before the outbreak of World War II it formed an air defence regiment that saw service during The Blitz and field companies that fought in the Western Desert and Italy, The unit continued in the postwar Territorial Army before finally disbanding in 1967.

== Early history ==
The enthusiasm for the Volunteer movement following an invasion scare in 1859 saw the creation of many local Rifle, Artillery and Engineer Volunteer units composed of part-time soldiers eager to supplement the Regular British Army in time of need. One of these was the 1st Hampshire Engineer Volunteer Corps (1st Hants EVC) based at Southampton. The first officers' commissions for the unit were issued on 25 January 1862. As a small, single company corps, it was attached for convenience to the 2nd Hampshire Rifle Volunteer Corps (RVC) in 1863, and both came under the 4th Administrative Battalion of Hampshire Rifle Volunteers in 1865.

In 1870, the unit was attached to the 2nd Tower Hamlets EVC in London rather than the local rifle units. Under the mobilisation scheme in force in 1880, the 1st Hants EVC formed part of the Garrison Army, assigned to defend the important naval base of Portsmouth, along with detachments from EVCs as far away as Yorkshire, Lancashire and Northamptonshire. However, the 1st Hants EVC was disbanded in 1881 and the volunteers absorbed by the 2nd Hampshire RVC.

== Reformed unit ==
A new 1st Hampshire Engineer Volunteers was formed at Portsmouth on 1 April 1891. This was a much larger unit - 481 men (mainly from Portsmouth Dockyard) volunteering for a unit with an official establishment of two companies totaling 100. The new unit included a cadet company at Weymouth until 1902, and the 1st Sussex Engineer Volunteers was attached to it for administrative purposes in 1892–95. The new corps rented and renovated the old drill hall of the 3rd Hampshire RVC, laid a parade ground, and practised digging field fortifications on Southsea Common. Non-Commissioned Officers from the corps took special courses on fortress engineering at the Royal Engineers' depot at Chatham.

The 1st Hampshire Royal Engineers (Volunteers) (as the unit was officially titled from 1896) sent a detachment of one officer and 25 other ranks to assist the regular REs during the Second Boer War in 1900, and a second section the following year.

== Territorial Force ==
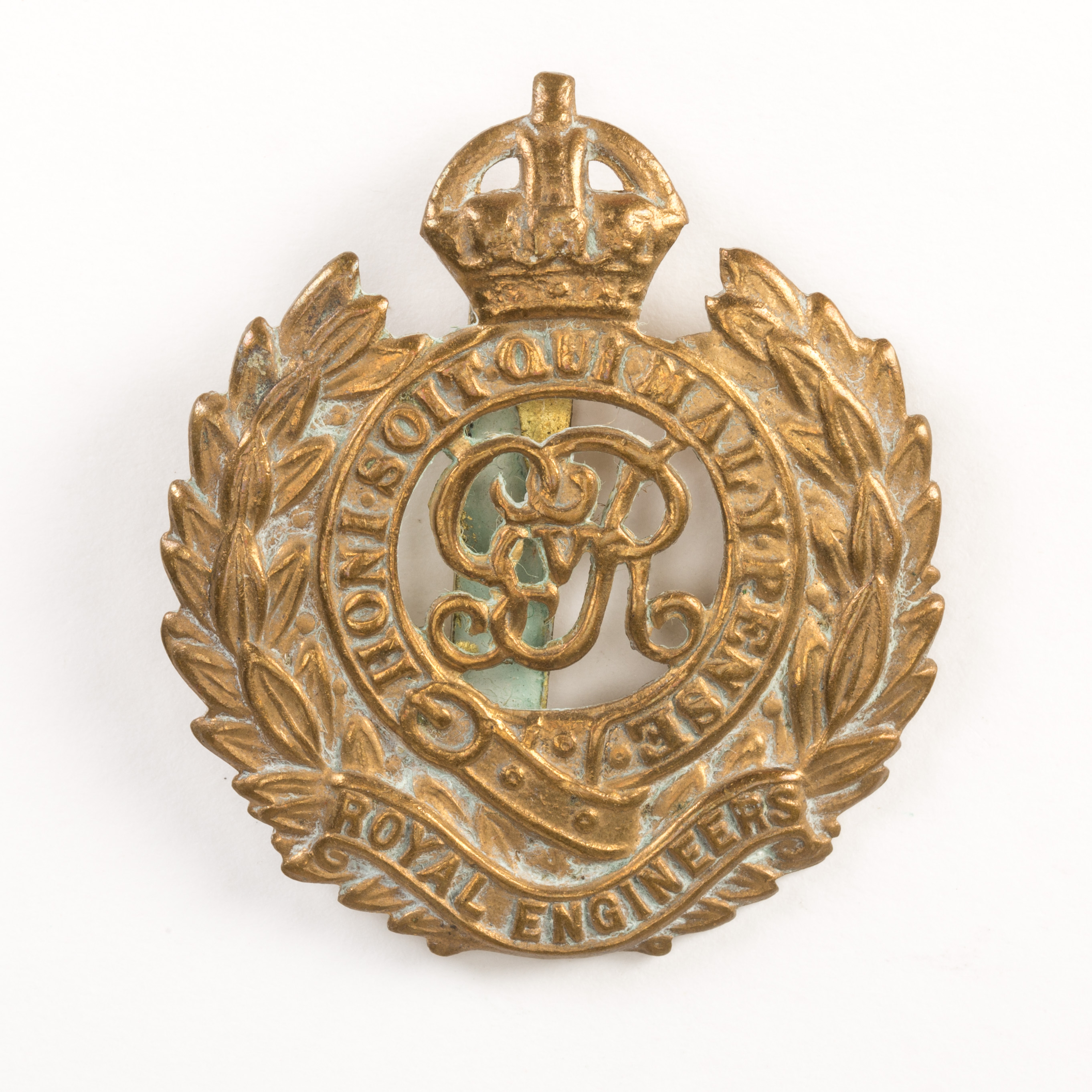
RE Cap badge (King George V cipher)

When the Volunteer Force was subsumed into the new Territorial Force (TF) under the Haldane Reforms in 1908, the 1st Hampshire RE (V) became the Hampshire (Fortress) RE (TF), forming part of Southern Coast Defences. By the outbreak of war in August 1914, the unit had the following organisation:

- HQ at Portsmouth
- No 1 Works Company at Commercial Road, Portsmouth
- No 2 Works Company at Hampshire Terrace, Portsmouth
- No 3 Works Company at Eastleigh
- No 4 Electric Light (EL) Company at Hampshire Terrace, Portsmouth
- No 5 EL Company at Freshwater, Isle of Wight
- No 6 EL Company at Gosport

Together with the Regular No 4 Company, RE, at Haslar Barracks in Gosport, the unit was responsible for the coastal defence searchlights in the Portsmouth area, including the Isle of Wight and the three sea forts at Spithead (Spitbank Fort, No Man's Land Fort and Horse Sand Fort).

== World War I ==
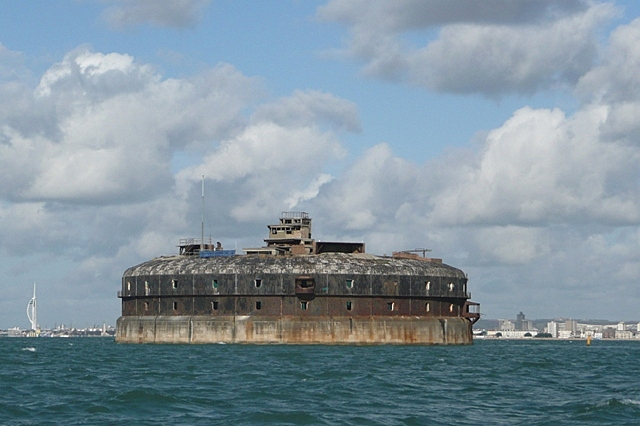
Horse Sand Fort

=== Coast and Anti-Aircraft defence ===
On the outbreak of war, the Hampshire (Fortress) RE had a serious deficiency of personnel. On 5 August, it was supplemented by No 4 Company of the Tyne Electrical Engineers (TEE), which took over several of the coast defence searchlight stations around Portsmouth. Two other companies of the TEE moved into Haslar Barracks in Gosport and later took over the running of the electric light training school from No 4 Co RE. As the war progressed, the requirement for anti-aircraft searchlights (AA/SLs), as well as coast defence lights, became vital, and the school at Haslar trained a large number of AA detachments for Home Defence and for service on the Western Front and other theatres of the war.

By November 1915, the Hampshire unit's strength had grown to 39 officers and 604 other ranks, and it took back responsibility for the three sea forts, and then, in May 1916, it took over from the TEE two new searchlight stations, Egypt Point and Stone Point, at the entrance to the Solent. On 25 September 1916, the only air attack on Portsmouth during World War I occurred when Kapitänleutnant Heinrich Mathy commanding the Zeppelin L31 hovered over the harbour in the searchlight beams, without actually dropping any bombs. Shortly after this raid, the Hampshire (Fortress) RE took over all the AA searchlights in Portsmouth Garrison, forming No 48 AA Company. In May 1918, the Portsmouth AA defences were included in the London Air Defence Area.

=== Expansion ===
Shortly after the outbreak of war, TF units were invited to volunteer for Overseas Service. On 15 August 1914, the War Office issued instructions to separate those men who had signed up for Home Service only, and form these into reserve units. On 31 August, the formation of a reserve or 2nd Line unit was authorised for each 1st Line unit where 60 per cent or more of the men had volunteered for Overseas Service. The titles of these 2nd Line units would be the same as the original, but distinguished by a '2/' prefix. In this way duplicate companies were created, as well as additional 1st Line companies from the volunteers pouring into the recruiting stations. Despite the initial manpower shortages of the Hampshire (Fortress) RE, these are known to have been numbered as high as 1/8th Hampshire EL Company.

The Hampshire (Fortress) RE also formed a number of 'Army Troops' and 'Works' companies for service with the armies at home and overseas:

- 1/1st Hampshire Fortress Company RE (TF) deployed to France on 25 February 1916, serving on the Somme later in the year. When TA companies of the RE were numbered in February 1917 it became 559th (Hants) Army Troops Company. It was serving with Third Army by the time of the Armistice with Germany in November 1918, and was disbanded after April 1919.
- 1/2nd Hampshire Fortress Company RE (TF) disembarked at Le Havre on 21 January 1915, joining First Army and billeting at Heuringhem near St Omer. It would later be re-named 560th (Hants) Army Troops Company, serving in and around the Loos Salient until late 1918, when it became part of Fifth Army. It was disbanded at the end of March 1919.
- 2/1st Hampshire Army Troops Company became 561st (Hampshire) Army Troops Company.
- 2/2nd Hampshire Army Troops Company, became 562nd (Hampshire) Army Troops Company.
- Another Hampshire Army Troops Company became 563rd (Hampshire) Works Company. It was attached to the Cyclist Division in the UK from March 1918. Later in 1918 it was scheduled to join the BEF for aerodrome construction but never went.
- 575th (Hampshire) Works Company was sent to the BEF on 28 July 1918 to work on aerodrome construction for the Royal Air Force.

The Hampshire (Fortress) RE also formed one field engineer company, from 1/7th Hampshire Army Troops Company.

=== Salonika campaign ===
The 1/7th Hampshire Field Company, (numbered 506th (Hampshire) Field Company in February 1917), embarked for France on 19 October 1915 and joined the 28th Division on 25 October as the division was embarking at Marseilles. The division arrived in Egypt by 22 November, and then re-embarked for the Macedonian front, completing disembarkation at Salonika by 4 January 1916.

Among the first tasks the newly arrived division had to carry out was construction of fieldworks across rough country, in winter, against the possibility of immediate Bulgarian attack: 'In the face of rain, snow, and the biting wind the infantry and engineers stuck to their task'. Offensive operations were rare on the Macedonian front, but work to improve defences and roads was continuous, and the 28th Division in the Struma Valley suffered badly from malaria. The largest operation in the Struma Valley was the capture by 28th Division of Karajakoi Bala, Karajakoi Zir and Yenikoi in October 1916. Defences of these villages then had to be consolidated. The outpost line consisted of a chain of these villages, trenched and wired, and garrisoned by infantry, machine gun teams and RE detachments.

28th Division took part in two further offensive operations in May and October 1917. Eventually, it participated in the Second Battle of Doiran beginning on 18 September 1918, which failed to break through the Bulgarian lines. However, the Bulgarians had been defeated elsewhere, and some days later the British realised that the entrenchments in front of them were empty. 28th Division then took part in the pursuit to the Strumica Valley (22–28 September).

After the Armistice with Bulgaria came into effect on 30 September, British forces, including 28th Division, advanced across the country towards Turkey. With no troops to defend Constantinople from this direction, the Ottoman Empire also signed an Armistice on 30 October. 28th Division was sent to occupy the Dardanelles Forts. 506th (Hampshire) Field Company was still in Turkey in April 1919, but after that the TF units were progressively replaced by Regular and Indian Army units and the Territorials were demobilised and returned home.

== Interwar ==
After the war, the Hampshire (Fortress) RE reformed in the Territorial Army (TA) with at least five companies. Once again it was assigned to defence of the South Coast of England, in 43rd Divisional Area. In 1922–23, the barracks at East Cowes on the Isle of Wight was converted into a headquarters for No 5 (EL) Company and part of '3rd (Hampshire) Field Company' (ie the 3rd (Wessex) Field Company raised in Portsmouth for the 43rd (Wessex) Divisional Engineers in 1914, which became 206th (Hampshire) Fd Co in the reformed TA). However, by 1927, No 5 Company had disappeared and the unit had the following organisation:

- No 1 (Works) Company
- No 2 (Lights) Company
- No 3 (Lights) Company
- No 4 (Lights) Company

Later, its organisation was:

- HQ at Hampshire Terrace, Portsmouth
- No 1 (AA/SL) Company at Hampshire Terrace
- No 2 (AA/SL) Company at East Cowes
- No 3 (EL) Company at RE Drill Hall, Haslar Road, Gosport
- No 4 (EL & Works) Company at Hampshire Terrace

In 1937, three companies were converted into a searchlight unit, 48th (Hampshire) Anti-Aircraft Battalion, RE (TA), with the following organisation:

- HQ at Portsmouth
- 391st Anti-Aircraft Company at Portsmouth
- 392nd Anti-Aircraft Company at East Cowes, Isle of Wight
- 393rd Anti-Aircraft Company at Gosport
- 394th Anti-Aircraft Company at Southampton

The following year, the battalion came under the command of 35th AA Brigade, based at Fareham, which formed part of 5th AA Division.

The remainder of the Hampshire Fortress RE continued as a single Electric Light and Works company in the Portsmouth Coast Defences. In 1938, it was joined by 206th (Hampshire) Field Company from 43rd (Wessex) Divisional Engineers, which became No 2 (206th) (Electric Light and Works) Company.

== World War II ==
=== Hampshire Fortress Engineers ===
In the early months of the war, the unit was engaged in installing and testing anti-shipping and anti-aircraft searchlights, generating gear and general defensive works. Its average strength at this time was 27 officers and 440–460 other ranks.

At the end of April 1940, the unit was ordered to hand over its responsibilities to units of the Royal Artillery (RA) and reorganise as a corps engineer unit as follows:

Hampshire Corps Troops RE (CTRE)

- 576th Corps Field Park Company
- 577th Army Field Company
- 578th Army Field Company
- 579th Army Field Company (formed from the Cinque Ports Fortress Royal Engineers based at Dover.

By the end of 1940, Hampshire CTRE had been redesignated as IV CTRE, assigned to IV Corps. The Corps sailed for the Middle East in November 1941 and was established in Iraq by 1 February 1942. 579th Company was left in the UK and transferred to VIII CTRE in December 1941. On arrival in Iraq, IV CTRE was detached from Corps HQ and sent to Egypt to join Eighth Army (IV Corps later went on to India).

=== XIII Corps Troops RE ===
==== Western Desert ====
In Egypt, the unit became XIII CTRE, assigned to XIII Corps in the Western Desert. In early 1941 all of XIII Corps' engineers were busy constructing the Gazala Line in an attempt to halt General Rommel's expected offensive. The attack came on 26 May; by 14 June, XIII Corps' infantry divisions had been forced out of the Gazala Line. Tobruk fell soon afterwards and with Eighth Army in headlong retreat the engineers had to destroy or salvage all the water supply, port and railway equipment to deny them to the enemy. From 27 June, all the corps' engineers were engaged in preparing a new defensive position at El Alamein.

Rommel was successfully held at Alamein and, on 23/24 October, Eighth Army went over to the offensive under General Montgomery at the Second Battle of El Alamein. For this offensive, 577th Company was temporarily attached to 44th (Home Counties) Division. After the battle, XIII Corps was given the job of securing prisoners and clearing the battlefield, where the engineers had 'the unenviable task of sorting out the maze of minefields, lifting some and marking others'. XIII Corps was mainly left in the rear areas for the rest of the North African Campaign.

==== Sicily and Calabria ====
XIII was given an assault role in the Allied invasion of Sicily (Operation Husky), sailing from Egypt and landing in the south east of the island on 10 July 1943. For this operation, XIII CTRE was joined by 56th Field Company, a Regular RE unit that had been serving with Tenth Army in Palestine; it remained with the unit for the rest of the war. The troops advanced steadily, supported by the engineers building numerous bridges and repairing damaged supply routes through rugged country, and the island was in Allied hands by 17 August.

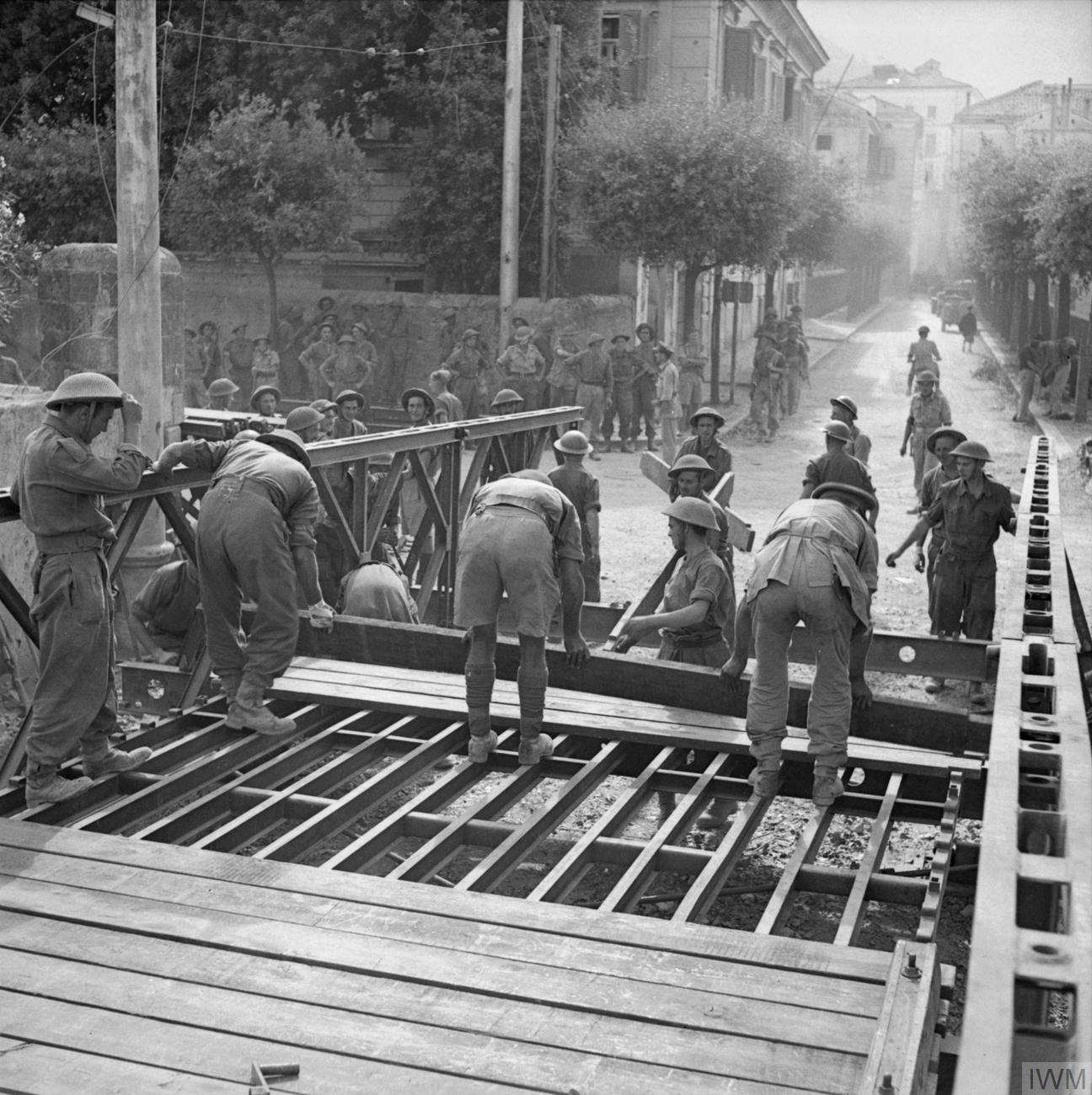
RE sappers complete a Bailey bridge to replace one blown by retreating Germans, Italy, September 1943.

XIII was also entrusted with the assault landing in the 'toe' of mainland Italy on 2/3 September, Operation Baytown. This was almost unopposed, but there was considerable work for the engineers in repairing the port of Reggio and replacing the usual demolished bridges.

==== Operation Diadem ====
Eighth Army steadily advanced up Italy until it was held at the Germans' Winter Line and stalemate set it. The following Spring, XIII Corps participated in the fourth Battle of Monte Cassino (Operation Diadem) with an assault crossing of the Rapido River on the night of 11 May 1944. The subsequent advance was dependent upon bridges being quickly established across this river, and 577 Field Co was made responsible for building a Class 40 Bailey bridge codenamed 'London' at San Angelo on the front of 8th Indian Division. A camouflaged track (also codenamed 'London') was prepared to bring the bridging material close to the river by night. The bridging operation began after the Indian troops had seized their bridgehead, and went on under cover of a smokescreen, while 8th Indian Division cleared San Angelo. 'London' was completed by 577 Fd Co at 10.30 on 14 May, and two additional Class 40 bridges into 8th Indian Division's bridgehead ('Edenbridge' and 'Tonbridge') were completed by 56 Fd Co at 17.00 and 22.00 respectively. 78th Division, which had been waiting for 'London' to open, crossed the river on 14 May to join in the attack the following day. The Official History gives much of the credit for the success of 'Diadem' to the British and Indian engineers.

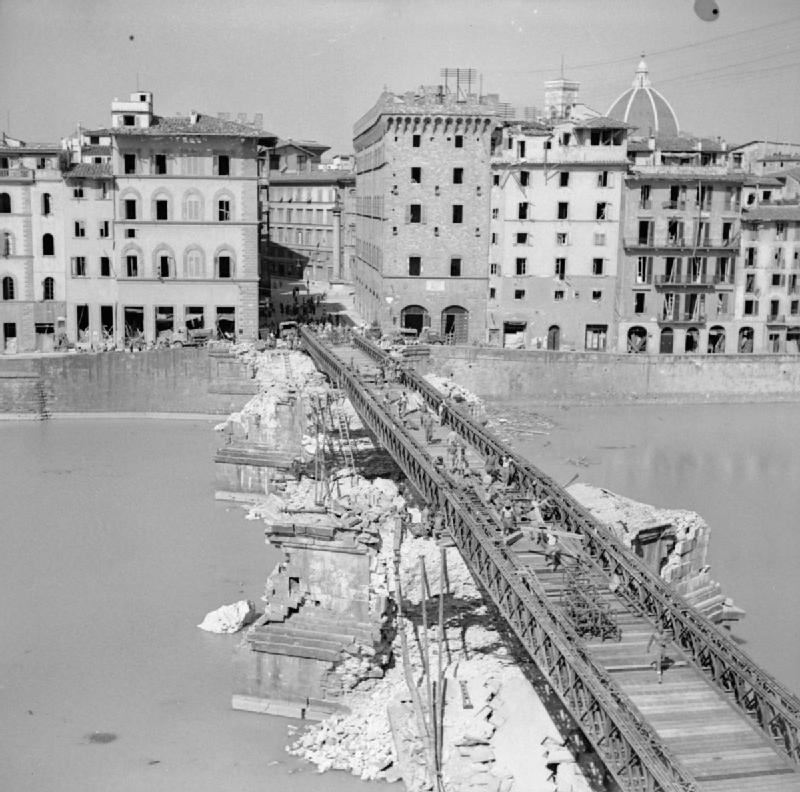
Bailey bridge constructed over the Arno in Florence by 577 Fd Co on 15 August 1944, using the piers of the original Ponte Santa Trinita bridge blown up by the Germans.

This success was followed by a breakthrough of the Hitler Line, and an advance to Florence, where the Germans had destroyed the historic bridges. By late August, 8 Indian Division had the task of crossing the River Arno where no peacetime road existed. During the nights of 25–27 August, the divisional engineers constructed improvised crossings under fire, after which XIII CTRE completed a low-level Bailey bridge by the morning of 28 August. The advance then continued to the Gothic Line.

==== Roadbuilding ====
The autumn's fighting involved a huge amount of bridgebuilding and road improvement in rough terrain. Along Highway 67, from Florence to Forlì, a section from Dicomano 'twisted and turned for six miles through a narrow cleft in the mountains, rising gently to San Godingo, whence it climbed nearly 3,000 feet in five miles to the Muraglione Pass'. The estimated time for re-opening this section was a month, but the sappers and gunners of 6th Armoured Division got it open in 13 days, after which XIII CTRE followed up and converted it into a two-way Class 40 road in 19 days. The most difficult sections were two demolitions of 260 feet (79 m) and 230 feet (70 m) respectively, which were widened, blasting away the rock face on one side and building up the other side on cribbing. The Corps engineers were assisted by 10th Mechanical Equipment Platoon, RE, a detachment of 1st Drilling Company, Royal Canadian Engineers, an anti-tank battery of the Royal Artillery, three-and-a-half companies of the Pioneer Corps, three general transport (GT) companies and two tipper platoons of the Royal Army Service Corps, and 70 Italian wood-cutters. Wood cut by the gunners and the Italians was turned into 'cribs' and 'dogs' by 576 Corps Field Park Co, which were then filled with rock quarried at Dicomano and rubble from ruined buildings.

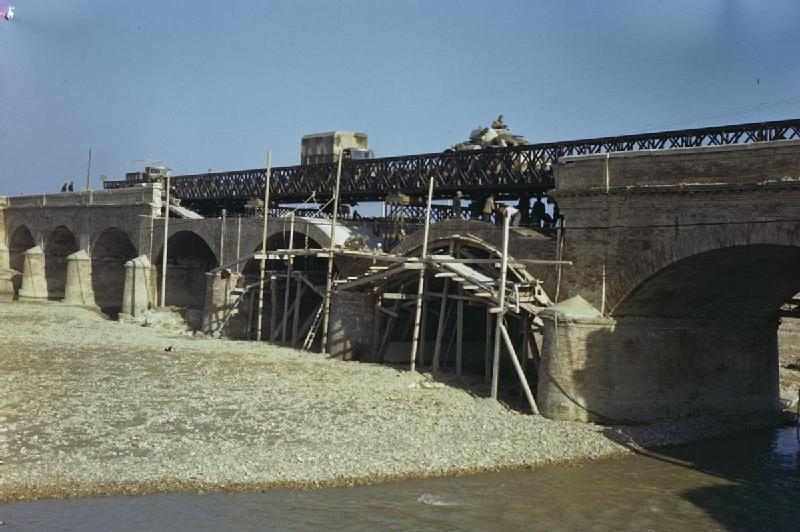
A Bailey bridge crosses a damaged bridge under repair in Italy.

Once through the Gothic Line, XIII Corps took over part of the front from US forces, whose engineers had opened a track ('Ace') from San Pietro on Highway 65, over the Apennine Mountains into the valley of the Santerno. This involved steep diversions that caused great difficulties for British transport. On the evening of 4 October, 56 Fd Co was summoned from work on Highway 67 to eliminate one of these diversions by building a 480 feet (150 m) Bailey bridge over a demolished six-arch brick bridge at San Andrea. The company was given about 500 British and Italian Pioneers to assist. The accessible piers were rebuilt, those that were inaccessible were reached by cantilevering Bailey sections across to them. The tallest inaccessible pier had the top 20 feet (6.1 m) blown off by using 6-pounder and 17-pounder anti-tank guns. The whole procedure was delayed by heavy rain and some shelling, but the company completed the job by midday on 15 October.

Maintaining routes such as 'Ace' during the winter months was a huge task, and XIII CTRE and 78th Division's RE had to be reinforced by US engineers when one section collapsed into mud.

==== Advance to the Po ====
XIII Corps spent the late winter of 1944–45 in the mountains above Bologna. Before the Allied Spring Offensive began, it was moved down to prepare to cross the River Po. 56 and 578 Field Companies were left behind to deal with the stocks of engineer equipment left in the mountains: they used it to build four Bailey bridges to repair the routes to bring stores down into the plain. They then rejoined XIII CTRE on 16 April. The whole weight of the corps' engineers was thrown into supporting the advance of 2nd New Zealand Division. XIII CTRE under its Commander, RE, (CRE) Lt-Col R.F. Hawker, was reinforced by two tipper platoons, two GT platoons and a composite platoon transporting rafts and assault boats, with three and a half Pioneer companies doing the loading and unloading. Two sets of Bailey equipment were delivered each day to 576 Fd Park Co, which kept two equipment dumps open, leapfrogging forward as the advance proceeded. The New Zealanders crossed the Sillaro on 14 April, and by dawn on 16 April three low-level Bailey bridges across it were completed. Between 16 and 20 April a number of canals were crossed, then on the night of 20/21st the New Zealanders made an assault crossing of the Idice. The following day XIII CTRE put over a 110 feet (34 m) high-level Bailey bridge, and the Po was reached on 23 April.

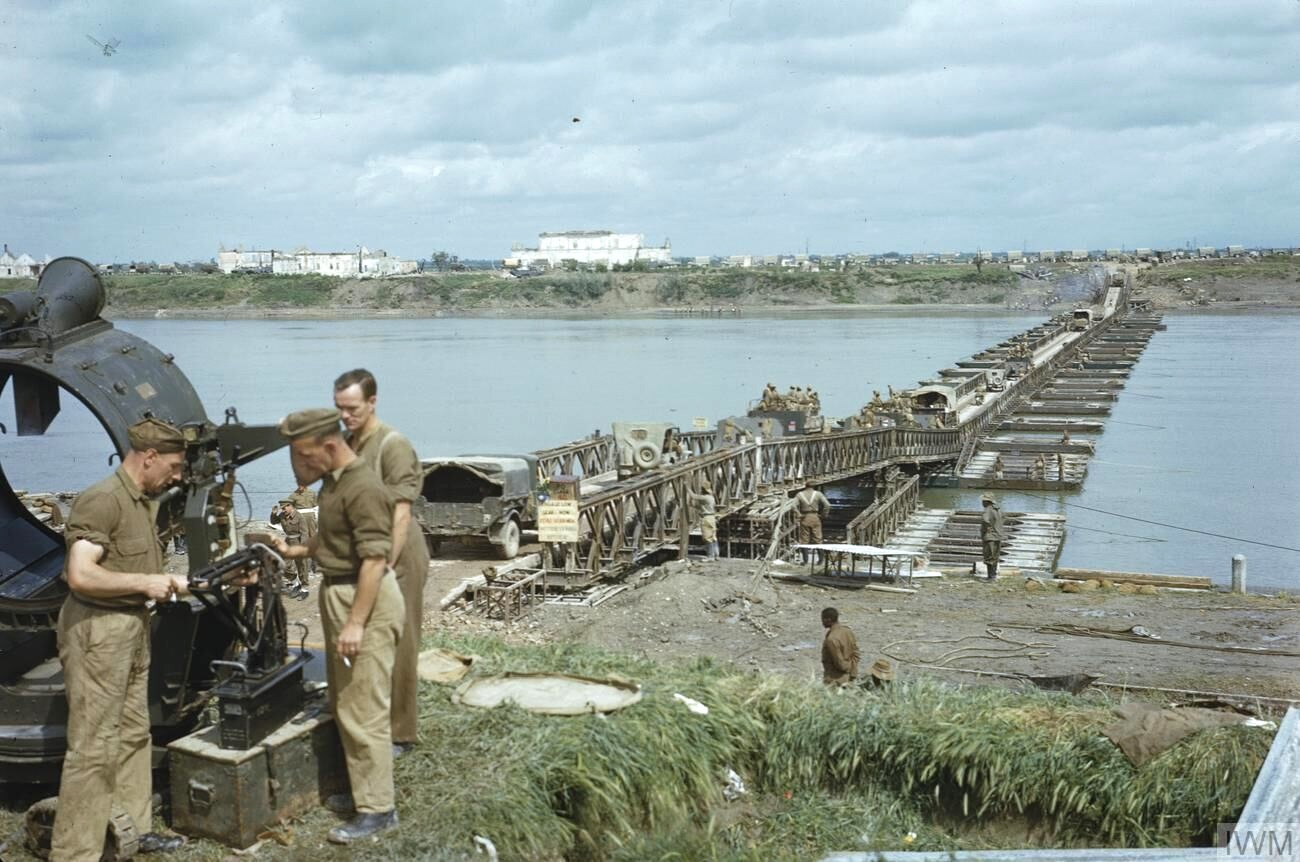
A Bailey pontoon bridge built over the Po, April 1945.

Bridging the wide Po was a major operation, but XIII Corps had made such good progress that it was allotted material for its own pontoon Bailey bridge in a rushed operation. The site selected from aerial photographs was found to be unsuitable due to Allied bomb craters, and the alternative meant bridging a 1,100 feet (340 m) gap and all available Bailey material and transport had to be collected from other formations. 2nd New Zealand Division began its assault crossing on the night of 24/25 April, and the convoy of bridging equipment began to move forward at dawn, arriving on site at 17.00. The first lorries crossed by a light Folding Boat Equipment (FBE) bridge erected by the New Zealand RE, heavier equipment going over by the New Zealanders' Class 40 ferry. This meant that both ends of the pontoon bridge could be started together and despite communication problems it was completed by 17.00 on 27 April. Two hours later it was damaged by an underwater explosion – whether by a floating mine or sabotage by frogmen was never ascertained – but was quickly repaired by dismantling and incorporating one of the New Zealanders' ferries. This was completed by 02.00 on 28 April - the longest floating Bailey bridge built in the longest Italian campaign.

The Po crossing was followed by a rapid advance to the Adige: bridging and supply were now the factors limiting the speed of advance. Engineer equipment was short but top priority was given to XIII Corps (the corps' chief engineer had a section of Military Police to escort his equipment through the traffic jams). This enabled XIII CTRE to throw a pontoon Bailey bridge across the fast-flowing Adige at Piacenza, which presented greater difficulties than the wide Po. Material arrived on site at 08.00 on 29 April and the 370 feet (110 m) bridge was completed by 22.00 on the same day, although work on the approaches prevented it being opened to traffic until next morning. XIII Corps now pursued the defeated Germans across the Venetian Plain to the Piave, which was reached on 29 April. The bridge had been wrecked by Allied bombers months before, but XIII CTRE arrived on 1 May with equipment to build a floating Bailey bridge. The German forces in Italy surrendered (the Surrender of Caserta) the following day, but XIII Corps continued advancing to Trieste as the war ended.

XIII CTRE was disbanded after September 1945.

=== 48th (Hampshire) Searchlight Regiment, RA ===
The TA's AA units were mobilised on 23 September 1938 during the Munich Crisis, with units manning their emergency positions within 24 hours, even though many did not yet have their full complement of men or equipment. The emergency lasted three weeks, and they were stood down on 13 October. In February 1939, the existing AA defences came under the control of a new Anti-Aircraft Command. In June, a partial mobilisation of TA units was begun in a process known as 'couverture', whereby each AA unit did a month's tour of duty in rotation to man selected AA and searchlight positions. On 24 August, ahead of the declaration of war, AA Command was fully mobilised at its war stations.

The AA Battalions of the RE were transferred to the Royal Artillery (RA) on 1 August 1940, so the unit was redesignated 48th (Hampshire) Searchlight Regiment, RA,(TA).

By the end of 1944, the German Luftwaffe was suffering from such shortages of pilots, aircraft and fuel that serious aerial attacks on the UK could be discounted. At the same time 21st Army Group fighting in North West Europe was suffering a severe manpower shortage, particularly among the infantry. In January 1945, the War Office began to reorganise surplus anti-aircraft and coastal artillery regiments in the UK into infantry battalions, primarily for line of communication and occupation duties, thereby releasing trained infantry for frontline service. In January 1945, 48th S/L Regiment became 636 (Hampshire) Infantry Regiment, RA. After infantry training, the battalion landed on the Continent on 7 May 1945 (the day before VE Day, and was assigned to Line of Communication duties with 21st Army Group.

== Postwar ==
=== 115 Construction Regiment ===
When the TA was reconstituted in 1947, the Hampshire Fortress RE was reformed as 115 Construction Regiment, RE, with its HQ at Fareham and the following organisation:

- 127 Construction Squadron
- 576 Park Squadron
- 577 Construction Squadron
- 578 Construction Squadron
- 581 Construction Squadron (formed in 1956 from 406 (Hampshire) Coast Regiment, Royal Artillery)

In 1961, the regiment was reorganised as 115 (Hampshire Fortress) Corps Engineer Regiment, when 577, 578 and 581 Squadrons became field squadrons, 576 Corps Field Park Squadron became independent, and 127 Squadron was disbanded.

The regiment was disbanded when the TA was reformed as the TAVR in 1967, but its personnel became D Company (Hampshire Fortress Royal Engineers) in the Hampshire and Isle of Wight Territorials until that unit was reduced to cadre in 1969.

== External sources ==
- Mark Conrad, The British Army, 1914 – archive site
- British Army units from 1945 on
- British Military History
- The Long, Long Trail
- Graham Watson, The Territorial Army 1947
- Land Forces of Britain, the Empire and Commonwealth (Regiments.org) - archive site
- The Royal Artillery 1939–45 - archive site
- RE Museum
- Victorian Forts and Artillery
