= St Helens Fort =

Sea fort off the Isle of Wight, England

- Solent, England
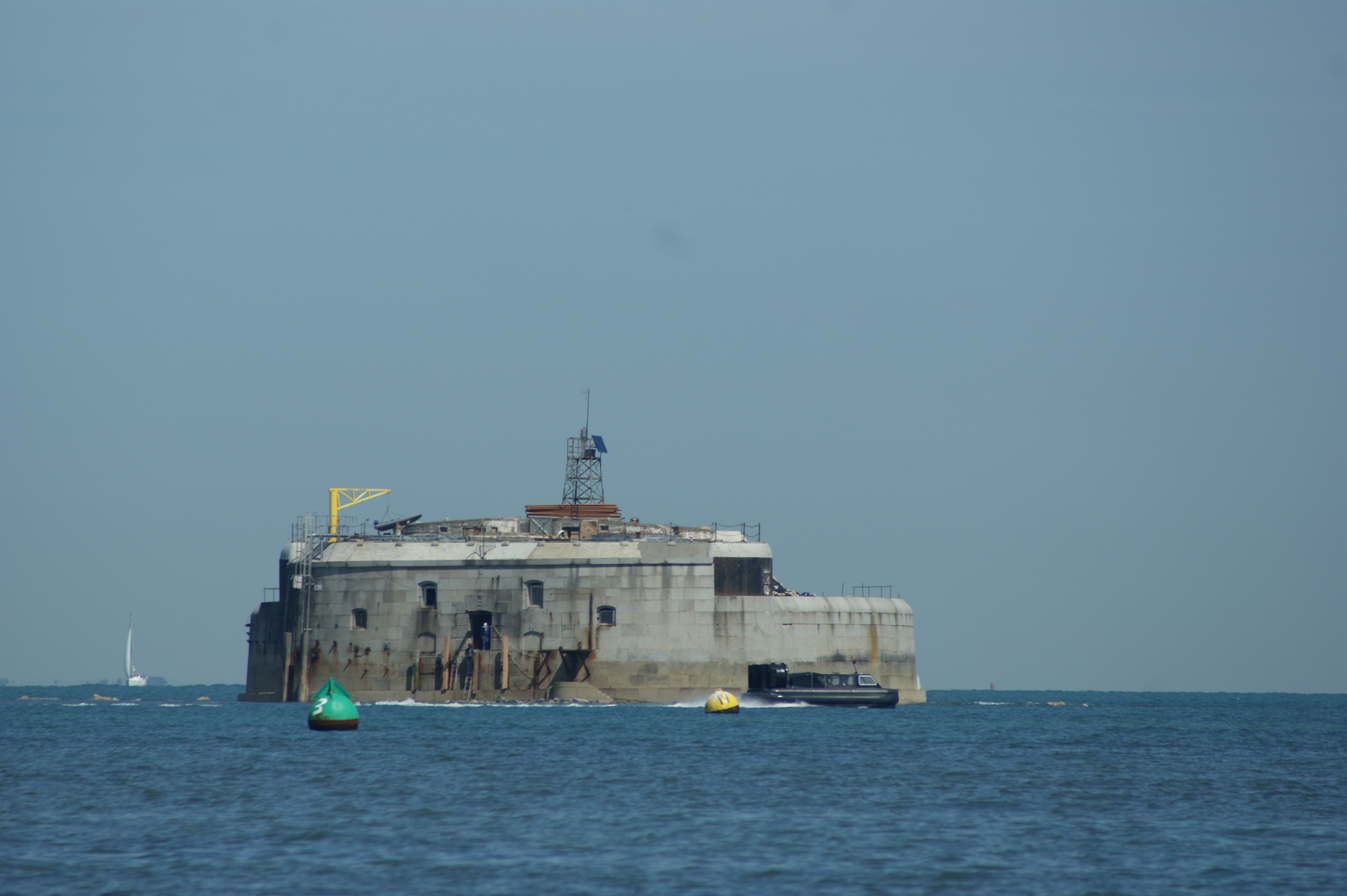
- St Helens Fort

Site information
- Type: Fort
- Open to the public: No

Scheduled monument
- Official name: St Helen's Fort
- Designated: 12 June 1967
- Reference no.: 1017370

Listed Building – Grade II
- Official name: St Helen's Fort
- Designated: 18 May 1972
- Reference no.: 1034399
- Condition: Complete

Location
- Coordinates: 50°42′18.3″N 1°5′1.9″W

Site history
- Built: 1867–1880

St Helens Fort is a sea fort in the Solent close to the Isle of Wight, one of the Palmerston Forts near Portsmouth. It was built as a result of the Royal Commission on the Defence of the United Kingdom of 1859, in order to protect the St Helens anchorage.

The fort was designed by Captain E. H. Stewart, overseen by Assistant Inspector General of Fortifications, Colonel W. F. D. Jervois. Construction began in 1865 and was completed in 1878, at a cost of £123,311. It suffered badly from subsidence which forced many changes to the plans, ending up with two 10-inch 18-ton rifled muzzle-loading (RML) guns to landward and one 12.5-inch 38-ton RML gun to seaward.

The other sea forts, all larger, are Spitbank Fort, Horse Sand Fort and No Man's Land Fort. The Solent Forts - often known as "Palmerston's Follies" - were built in response to a French invasion scare under Louis Napoleon III. This was due in part to the doctrines of the Jeune École of French naval thinking, which emphasised attacking ports with small craft, instead of fleet action, as well as the launch of the first ironclad warship, the Gloire. The threat of war with France receded after the Franco-Prussian War in 1870-71 ended in French defeat.

The forts were later used for defence in both World War I and WWII, although the heavier armaments proved unpopular with local householders due to the concussion breaking windows during firing practice. A National Trust report states that during WW II, it was "used as a searchlight and anti-aircraft gun platform".

Subsequently their main useful role has been as navigational lighthouses. Periodically (often in August), on one of the lowest tides of the year, there is a mass walk from St Helens beach out to the fort and back. At this day the causeway appears from the sea upon which the original materials were carried out from the shore at St Helen's Old Church, where there was formerly a quarry. Access is from this point, but also along the spit from Bembridge. It has become traditional to hold a barbecue on the beach thereafter. This event is entirely spontaneous but safety boat services are provided by local yacht clubs and the RNLI.

The fort is now in private hands and not open to the public. It was offered for sale in 2003. Any private resident would not have access to local authority services, although it has its own artesian well. As of 2020, Spitbank, No Man's Land and Horse Sand Forts were also privately owned (by Clarenco); the first two had been converted into hotels after a major restoration.
