= 525th (Antrim) Coast Regiment, Royal Artillery =

188 (Antrim) Heavy Battery, RA (TA) 525th (Antrim) Coast Regiment, RA (TA) 429 (Antrim) Coast Regiment, RA (TA)
- Royal Artillery cap badge (pre-1953)
- Active: March 1937–1 October 1956
- Country: United Kingdom
- Branch: Territorial Army
- Role: Coastal Artillery
- Size: Regiment
- Garrison/HQ: Belfast

525th (Antrim) Coast Regiment, Royal Artillery (TA) was a volunteer coastal defence unit of Britain's Territorial Army from 1937 until 1956. It was the first Territorial Army unit to be raised in Northern Ireland.

== Origin ==
Originally raised in March 1937 as 188th (Antrim) Independent Heavy Battery, Royal Artillery, an independent coast defence battery with its HQ at 32 Great Victoria Street, Belfast, this was the first Territorial Army (TA) unit to be formed in Northern Ireland. Previously, all part-time auxiliary units in the province were part of the Supplementary Reserve, derived from the former Militia. The Antrim Artillery Militia had been placed in suspended animation in 1919; nevertheless the new unit claimed to continue its heritage. (Note: Although the Militia remained in legal existence it was moribund. The 'Antrim Militia, RA', as it was termed from 1 June 1924, only had two officers listed by 1939. The militia was formally disbanded in 1953.)

== World War II ==
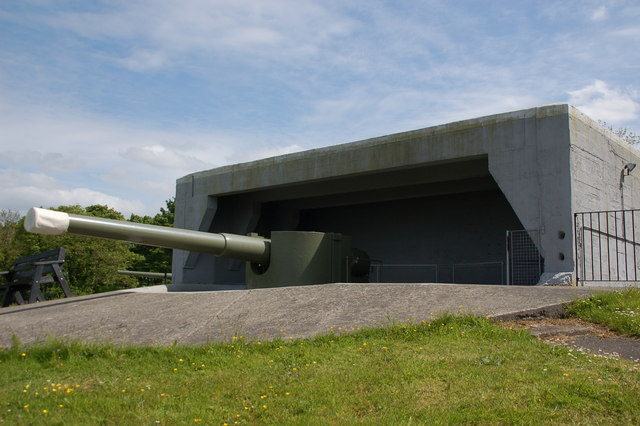
6-inch breech-loading gun at Grey Point Fort

When mobilised on the outbreak of war in September 1939 188 (Antrim) Bty was responsible for manning four 6-inch guns at the 'Defended Port of Belfast'.

On 1 March 1940, 188 Bty was expanded to a full regiment, with 188 and 200 Btys, initially as the Antrim Heavy Regiment, RA, but redesignated on 14 July 1940 as 525th (Antrim) Coast Regiment, RA, with A and B Btys. As the war progressed the regiment had the following organisation:

- Regimental Headquarters (RHQ)
- A Bty at Grey Point Fort– became 113 Bty 1 April 1941
- B Bty at Kilroot – became 114 Bty 1 April 1941
- C Bty at Orlock Point – formed 11 February 1941; became 115 Bty 1 April 1941
- 380 Bty at Magilligan Point, near Londonderry – formed 22 February 1941
- 381 Bty at Larne – formed 22 February 1941

By the time the UK's coast defences reached their height in September 1941, the regiment was manning the following:

- Belfast – 6 × 6-inch
- Larne – 2 × 6-inch
- Londonderry – 2 × 6-inch, 1 × 12-pounder

There were no further changes during the war. On 1 June 1945 RHQ and the three TA batteries (114, 115, 116) began entering 'suspended animation' (completing the process on 22 June), while the two war-formed batteries (380, 381) were disbanded.

== Postwar ==
When the TA was reconstituted on 1 January 1947 the regiment reformed as 429 (Antrim) Coast Regiment.

The coast artillery branch of the RA was abolished during 1956 and on 1 October the regiment was converted to Royal Engineers (RE) and redesignated as 146 (Antrim Artillery) Field Engineer Regiment, RE:

- 255 Field Squadron
- 256 Field Squadron
- 259 Field Squadron
- 260 Corps Field Park Squadron – independent from 1961

The TA was reduced into the Territorial and Army Volunteer Reserve (TAVR) in 1967, when the regiment was consolidated with 591 Independent Field Sqn to form 74 Engineer Regiment (Volunteers), consisting of:

- 112 (Antrim Fortress) Field Sqn
- 114 (Antrim Artillery) Field Sqn
- 272 Field Sqn

This regiment was disbanded 1 April 1994 and reduced to 74 Independent Fd Sqn, RE (Vol), at Bangor, County Down, which in turn was disbanded on 1 July 1999, when its history and traditions were transferred to 85 (Ulster) Signal Squadron of 40 (Ulster) Signal Regiment in the Royal Corps of Signals. Until it was disbanded in 2009 this squadron claimed a lineage back to the Antrim Militia of 1793.

== Insignia ==
From 1947 to 1956, 429 Coast Rgt wore an embroidered supplementary shoulder title 'ANTRIM' in red on blue beneath the standard RA title on the battledress blouse. From about 1953 the regiment adopted a special gilt or anodised gold collar badge consisting of the Hand of Ulster within a strap inscribed 'ANTRIM ARTILLERY', surmounted by a crown. This continued to be worn after the conversion to RA in 1956.

== Honorary Colonel ==
Viscount Masserene & Ferrard, DSO, Lord Lieutenant of Antrim, was appointed Honorary Colonel of 188 Bty on 14 August 1937.

== External Sources ==
- British Army units from 1945 on
- Royal Artillery 1939–45.
