= Antrim Fortress Royal Engineers =

Antrim Fortress Royal Engineers 591 (Antrim) Parachute Field Squadron 112 (Antrim Fortress) Field Squadron
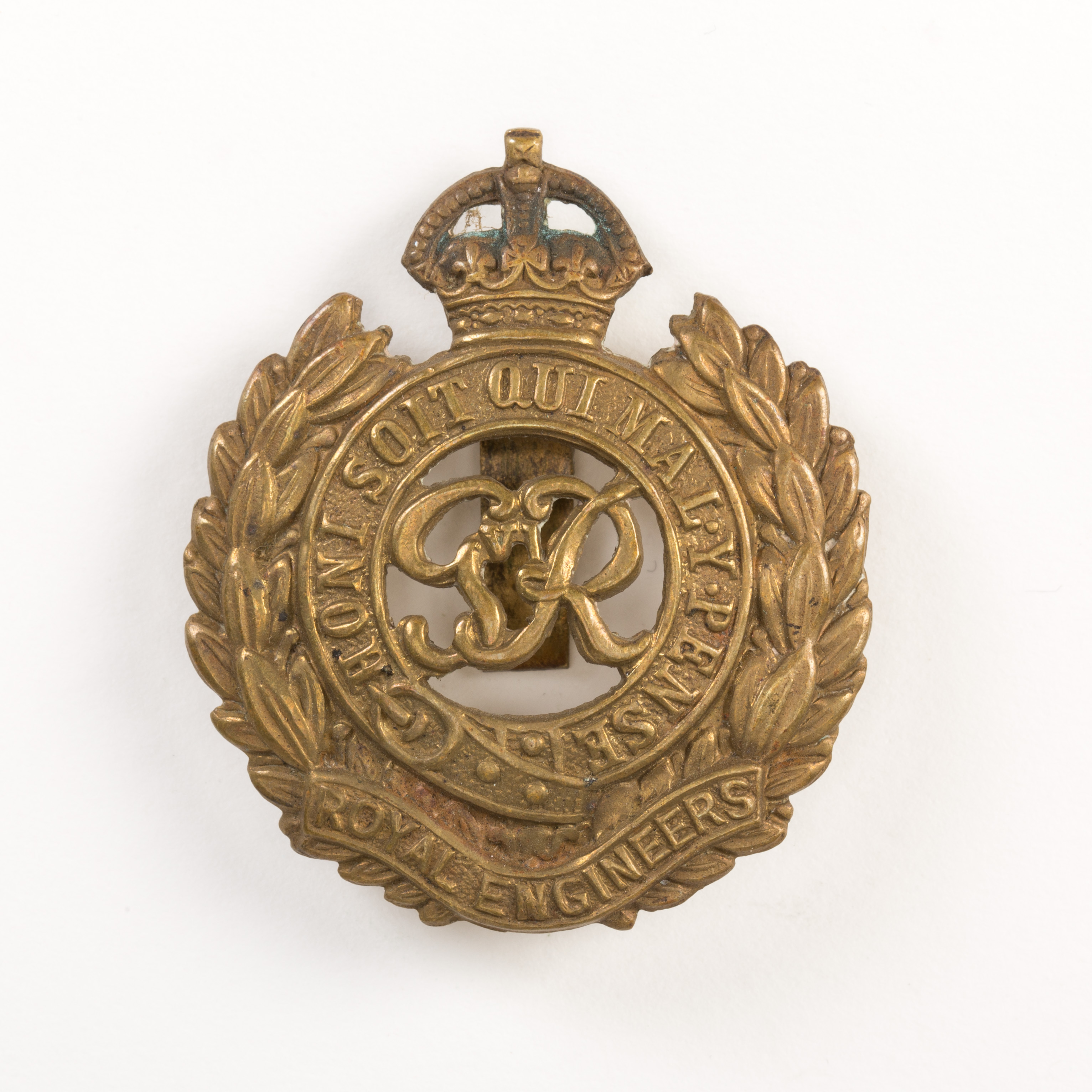
- RE Cap badge (King George VI cipher)
- Active: 1938–1999; 2006–present
- Country: United Kingdom
- Branch: Territorial Force
- Role: Fortress engineers Parachute engineers Field engineers
- Part of: Northern Ireland Fixed Defences; 6th Airborne Division
- Garrison/HQ: Belfast; Bangor, County Down
- Nickname: The Antrims
- Engagements: D Day; Operation Varsity

Commanders
- Notable commanders: Major Maynard Sinclair

The Antrim Fortress Royal Engineers was a coast defence unit of the UK's Territorial Army formed in Northern Ireland in the late 1930s. During World War II it was converted to a parachute role and dropped into Normandy on D Day and across the Rhine during Operation Varsity. Its successors continue in the Army Reserve today.

== Origin ==
When the Territorial Army (TA) was established in 1921 it did not extend to Northern Ireland; the auxiliary forces in the province were part of the Supplementary Reserve (SR), successors to the old Militia. However, when the TA began to expand in the worsening international situation of the late 1930s, the first TA units of the Royal Artillery (RA) and Royal Engineers (RE) were established in Northern Ireland. One of these was the Antrim (Fortress) Company Royal Engineers, formed in October 1937 with its headquarters at 32 Great Victoria Street, Belfast, County Antrim. Captain J. Maynard Sinclair of the Reserve of Officers was appointed Officer Commanding (OC) with the local rank of Major. The company's role was to man the searchlights (S/Ls) and associated electrical generators at Grey Point Battery and Killroot Battery guarding the entrance to Belfast Lough.

== World War II ==
=== Mobilisation ===
The unit mobilised on 24 August 1939, before the outbreak of war, as part of Fixed Defences in Northern Ireland District and took up its war stations at Grey Point and Killroot, Maj Sinclar being summoned back from holiday in Scotland. In 1940 it was decided to transfer responsibility for S/L provision to the Royal Artillery, and in June 'The Antrims' began training to convert into an Army Troops company, though this was delayed while the company established extra S/L positions at Larne, County Antrim, and Magilligan, County Londonderry.

On 30 September the company was ordered to move to Portaferry, County Down, to form 591 (Antrim) Army Field Company, RE. The 'engine room' staff remained with the Fixed Defences, while three officers and 29 Other Ranks (ORs) provided the cadre for the new company, which officially came into existence on 1 December. A draft of 100 ORs was received from No 5 Training Battalion, RE, on 25 December. Major Sinclair had been elected to the House of Commons of Northern Ireland in 1938 and in January 1941 he was appointed a junior minister in the Northern Ireland Government; he was replaced as OC by Maj Arthur White.

In January 1941 the company went to Halifax, West Yorkshire, and joined II Corps, moving to Ely, Cambridgeshire, in March. It received further drafts of sappers and drivers and trained in bridgebuilding; it was also responsible for demolitions in case of invasion, built hutted camps across the country, and took part in major training exercises. The company was briefly assigned to 76th Infantry Division (18 November–29 December 1941), then on 31 December it went to Woodbridge, Suffolk, and joined 54th (East Anglian) Infantry Division. The company continued training through 1942; Maj Philip 'Andy' Wood was appointed OC on 10 October.

=== 591 (Antrim) Parachute Squadron ===
British airborne forces' shoulder patch

54th Division was disbanded on 20 May 1943, when the RE headquarters (HQRE) was redesignated HQRE for the new 6th Airborne Division and the field companies were converted to the airborne role. The 'Antrims' were now designated 591 (Antrim) Parachute Squadron, RE, just under half the men coming from the original company, the remainder being volunteers from other RE units. Squadron HQ moved to Bulford Camp on Salisbury Plain while parties went to Hardwick Hall in Derbyshire to train as parachutists, carrying out their practice drops at No. 1 Parachute Training School at RAF Ringway. The squadron completed its mobilisation for active service on 31 January 1944. 6th Airborne Division was now in intensive training for the planned Allied invasion of Normandy (Operation Overlord).

==== Normandy ====
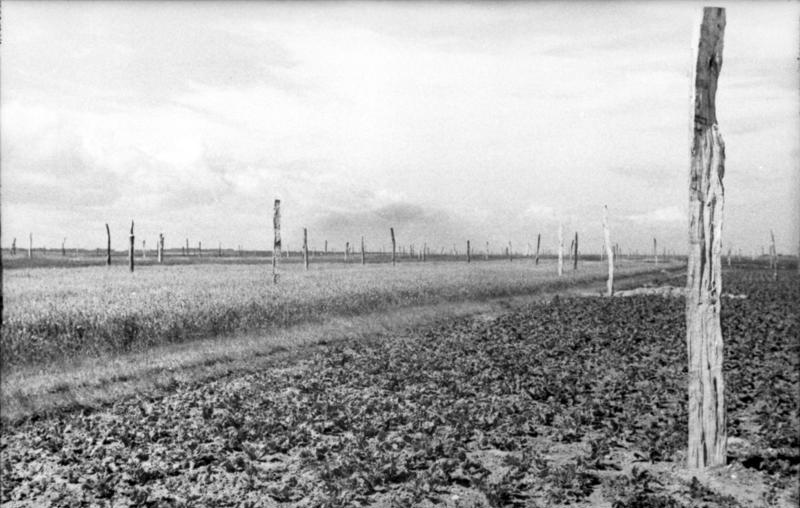
'Rommel's asparagus' was planted in French fields in 1944 to damage gliders.

6th Airborne Division's role in Overlord was to make a night drop in the early hours of D Day (6 June) to secure the east flank of the seaborne landings by capturing the vital bridges over the River Orne and Caen Canal and neutralising the Merville Battery. 2 Troop of 591 Para Sqn was attached to 9th Parachute Battalion for the Merville attack. No 7 Section flew in a Horsa glider from RAF Broadwell with the Coup de main party, while Nos 5, 6 and 8 Sections flew in Dakotas to drop with the rest of the battalion. Meanwhile, 1 and 3 Trps were to fly in six Stirlings from RAF Fairford and drop with Advanced HQRE 6th Airborne Division and 5th Parachute Brigade on the bridges.

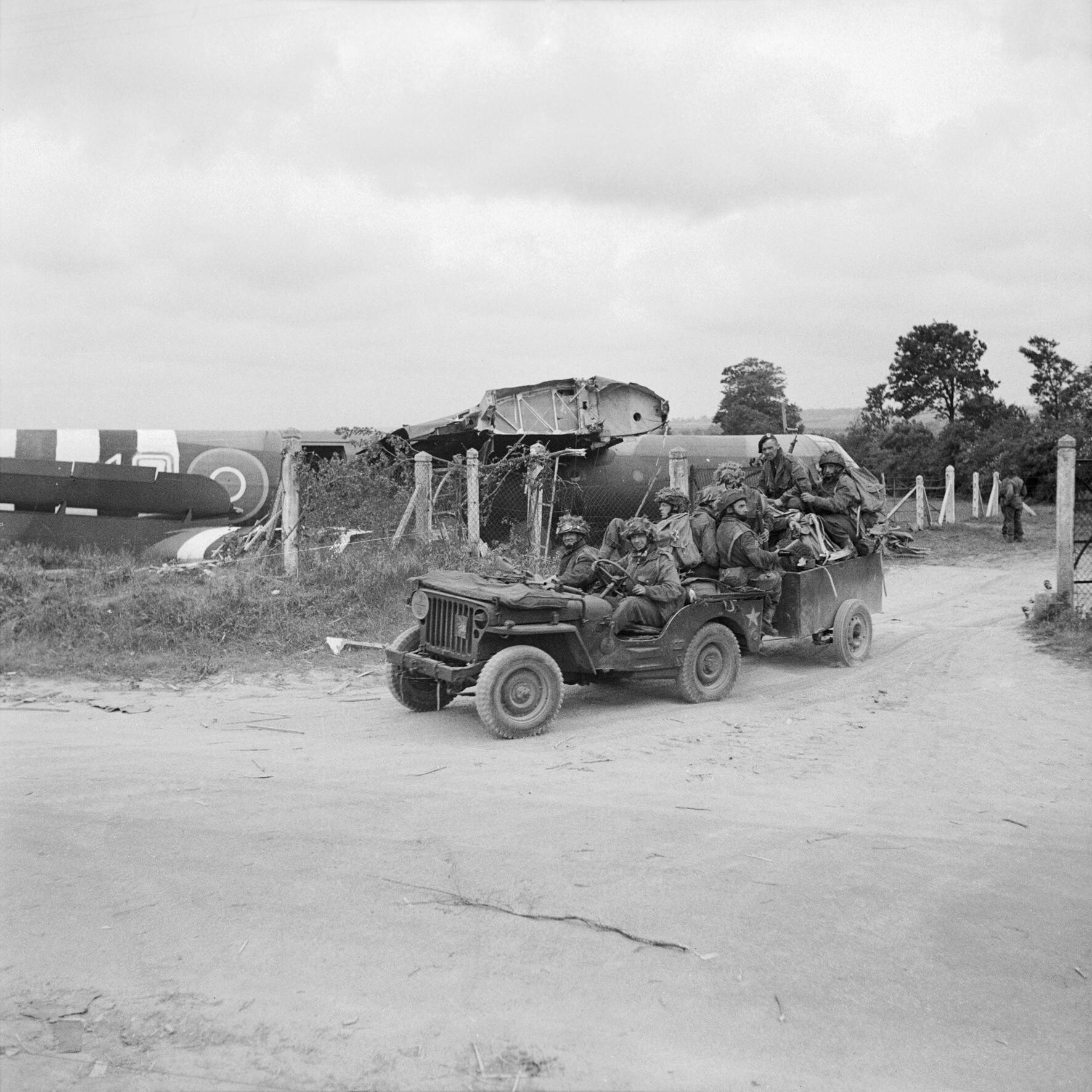
Airborne troops drive off Landing Zone N on the evening of 6 June.

591 Parachute Sqn was unlucky on D Day: some of its aircraft had to turn back and others were widely scattered. None of 2 Trp arrived to take part in the Battle of Merville Gun Battery, and their engineering stores were lost in marshes, so although the battery was captured the paratroopers could not fully destroy the guns before withdrawing. The rest of the squadron's 'sticks' landed far and wide. The OC, Maj Wood, his second-in-command, a troop commander, two other officers and a number of ORs were captured. Although the second-in-command (Capt Gordon 'Bud' Davidson) managed to escape and rejoin, it fell to a troop commander and a handful of other offices and men to do what they could. The chief task was to remove anti-glider poles ('Rommel's asparagus') from Landing Zone N; luckily it proved unnecessary to use explosive and the poles could be cleared by hand. Two landing strips were ready when the first gliders arrived at 03.20 on 6 June. Two more strips were prepared for the following evening's mass fly-in of gliders bringing reinforcements and supplies. Meanwhile, other members of 591 Para Sqn assisted 13th (Lancashire) Parachute Battalion in clearing Ranville, and the squadron then collected the mines that had been dropped and laid them to defend the landing zone. Captain Davidson was promoted to command the 'Antrims'.

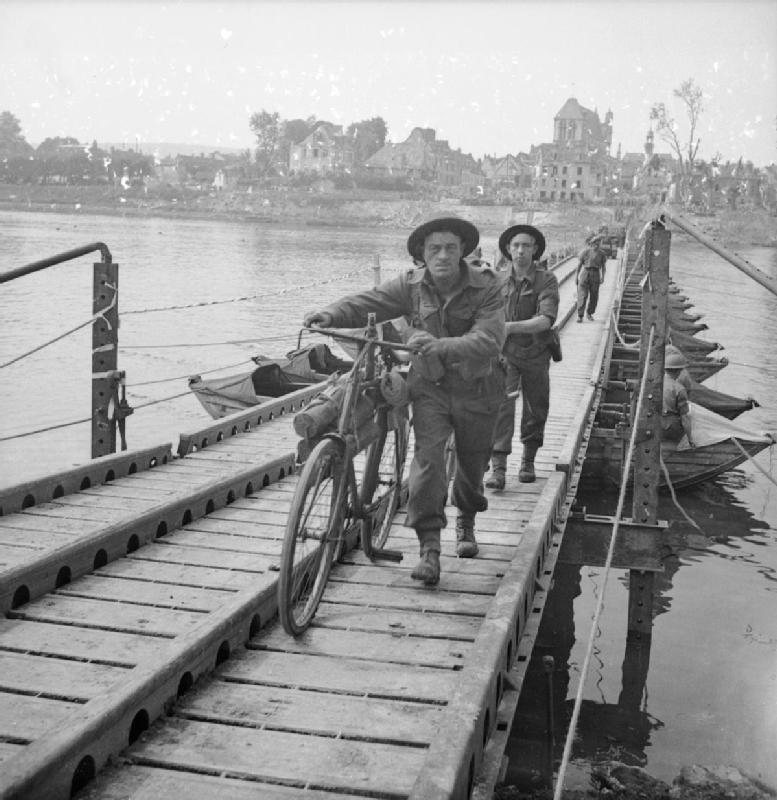
An FBE pontoon bridge in France, 1944.

6th Airborne Division remained in Normandy, guarding the left flank of the beachhead until 21st Army Group succeeded in breaking out. The 'Antrims' at Ranville were engaged in general tasks such as laying minefields, maintaining roads, establishing water points and constructing machine gun positions and shelters for ambulances and HQs. When the breakout began on 17 August, 6th Airborne captured Troarn where 591 Para Sqn with a platoon of 249 (East Anglian) Airborne Sqn built Folding Boat Equipment (FBE) bridges across dykes and the River Dives, and opened a ford to allow tanks to cross the river. By 24 August it was using captured German bridging equipment to cross the River Touques at Rocheville to speed the division's advance. At ethe end of August 6 Airborne was pulled out of the line and the 'Antrims' prepared to return by sea to Bulford for rest, re-equipment, and training. Major Allan Jack took over command on 11 November.

At the end of 1944 6th Airborne Division was rushed back to the Continent as reinforcements in response to the German Ardennes Offensive. On 22 December 591 Para Sqn went to Folkestone to embark on the SS Canterbury, disembarking at Ostend on 26 December. The division was sent to seal off the northern flank of the German 'Bulge', involving some hard fighting in the Battle of Bure. The Antrims were mainly employed in bridgebuilding and mine clearance. 6th Airborne remained in the Low Countries until late February 1945, when it returned from Ostend to Bulford to prepare for the crossing of the Rhine (Operation Varsity).

==== Operation Varsity ====
For the Rhine operation, the airborne landings (Varsity) took place in daylight following a night crossing by ground forces (Operation Plunder). 6th Airborne's objective was to seize crossings over the River Issel beyond the Rhine. 591 Squadron was organised into two troops: No 1 Trp had six glider parties with 6th Airlanding Brigade for the assault on the three Issel bridges, while Maj Jack and No 2 Trp parachuted from four aircraft, accompanied by two gliders carrying Jeeps and stores, supporting 5th Parachute Bde in securing routes to the Issel. They took off from RAF Rivenhall at 05.30 and 07.30, and arrived over the Rhine at 10.00.

The gliders with the coup de main party each contained five sappers with a Jeep, trailer and motorcycle; two of these groups were assigned to each bridge. There was considerable Flak on the run-in: two of the gliders were shot down en route and two others were shot upon landing with considerable casualties; two parties arrived intact, only one (led by Lieutenant Peter Cox) in the correct position. Cox's party arrived at 10.20 and was involved in heavy fighting at the bridge, but once a company of 1st Battalion Royal Ulster Rifles had captured it at 11.15 the sappers were able to prepare it for demolition. The two surviving parties then went to the bridge captured by 2nd Bn Oxfordshire and Buckinghamshire Light Infantry, but this bridge was under heavy fire and demolition charges could not be placed until after dark. This bridge was successfully demolished next day when threatened by a German armoured counter-attack.

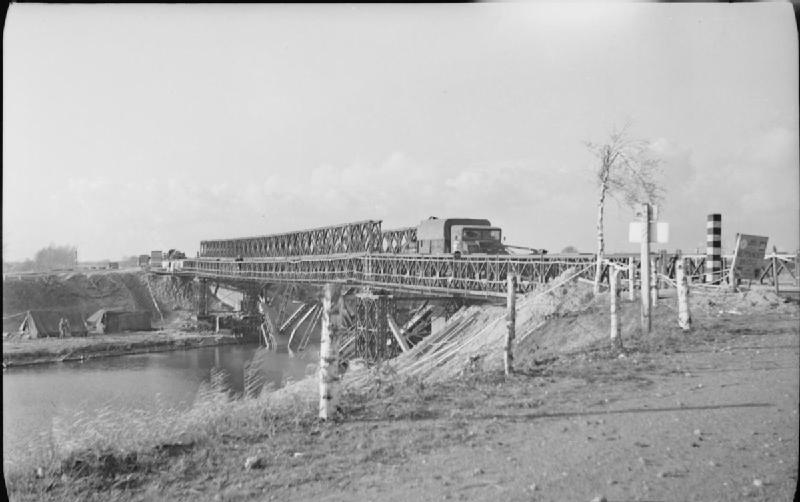
A completed Bailey bridge in North West Europe 1944–45.

The parachute party encountered considerable flak and small arms fire, but suffered few casualties. There was chaos at the rendezvous, most of the brigade having been dropped 1 mile (1.6 km) from its target. 2 Troop concentrated at 5th Parachute Bde HQ and dug in, but there was little need for engineering work, so one party left to destroy a captured German gun position and in the evening the troop moved off to join Cox's party with 6th Airlanding Bde.

After the Rhine, 6th Airborne advanced rapidly across North Germany, even outpacing 11th Armoured Division. On 1–2 April 591 Sqn built 'Antrim', a 120 feet (37 m) Class 40 (40 ton) Bailey bridge across the Dortmund–Ems Canal. On 5 April the squadron used assault boats to get 6th Airlanding Bde across the River Weser at Petershagen, and then helped 5th Parachute Bde consolidate a bridgehead over the River Leine at Neustadt am Rübenberge. 6th Airborne's sappers were held in reserve when 21st Army Group stormed across the Elbe. By the time of the German surrender at Lüneburg Heath on 4 May, 6th Airborne had reached Wismar on the Baltic coast.

==== Norway ====
After the end of the war in Europe the squadron was redesignated 591 (Antrim) Airborne Squadron, RE, and transferred on 1 June to 1st Airborne Division, which was serving in Norway as part of Operation Doomsday to disarm German troops. The squadron returned to the UK in early 1946 when it was demobilised and placed in suspended animation on 15 March.

== Postwar ==
When the TA was reconstituted in 1947, 591 (Antrim) Independent Field Sqn reformed in two Nissen huts at Girdwood Park, Belfast, forming part of 107th (Ulster) Brigade. Maynard Sinclair was appointed Honorary Colonel of the revived unit. In 1956 the coast artillery branch was disbanded, and the Antrim unit first raised in 1937 was transferred to the RE as 146 (Antrim Artillery) Corps Engineer Regiment. Following the 1966 Defence White Paper 107 (Ulster) Bde was disbanded and 591 Sqn was placed in suspended animation, but the following year it was reformed and amalgamated with 146 Rgt as 74 (Antrim Artillery) Engineer Regiment, forming 112 (Antrim Fortress) Field Squadron.

In 1993 the regiment was reduced to a single squadron, 74 (Antrim Artillery) Independent Field Sqn at Bangor, County Down. This in turn was disbanded under the Strategic Defence Review in 1999. A new 591 (Antrim Artillery) Field Sqn was formed at Balloo TA Centre, Bangor, in October 2006 and continues the traditions. (Note: Between 1979 and 1993 the number 591 was taken by an Explosive Ordnance Disposal squadron of 101 (City of London) Engineer Regiment.)

== See also ==
- 591 (Antrim) Squadron Roll of Honour

== External sources ==
- British Army units from 1945 on
- 591 (Antrim) Parachute Sqn site
- Paradata site
- Orders of Battle at Patriot Files
- Pillbox Study Group
- Graham Watson, The Territorial Army 1947
