= 85 (Ulster) Signal Squadron =

107th (Ulster) Independent Infantry Brigade Signal Squadron 302 Signal Squadron 85 Signal Squadron
- Cap badge of the Royal Corps of Signals
- Active: 1947–1967; 1967–2009
- Country: United Kingdom
- Branch: British Army
- Type: Military communications unit
- Size: Squadron
- Part of: 40th (Ulster) Signal Regiment
- Squadron HQ: Belfast
- Nickname: "The Ulster Signallers"
- Corps: Royal Corps of Signals

Insignia
- Tactical Recognition Flash

85 (Ulster) Signal Squadron was a military communications unit of the British Territorial Army, which formed part of the Royal Corps of Signals. The squadron was one of four signal squadrons which formed part of 40th (Ulster) Signal Regiment until its disbandment in 2009.

== Formation ==
On 1 April 1947, 107th (Ulster) Independent Infantry Brigade was formed as the first Territorial Army (TA) brigade in Northern Ireland (Note: Previously the only brigade sized unit in the area (3rd Anti-Aircraft Brigade) was part of the Supplementary Reserve (Militia).). The new brigade oversaw all TA troops in Northern Ireland (except those of Anti-Aircraft Command and coastal defence/regular units). 107th (Ulster) Independent Infantry Brigade Signal Squadron was formed shortly after to provide communications support to the brigade and its subordinate units.

In 1959 the Royal Corps of Signals went through an internal reorganisation, in which the numbering system in-place was completely revamped. This would bring the corps in-line with the Royal Artillery and Royal Engineers, which this reform was mostly based on. Troops of the TA within the corps were also reorganised along these same lines, in which all TA signal units below the level of divisional signal regiments became numbered in the 300 series. As part of this change, the squadron was retitled as 302 Signal Squadron. In 1961 when the TA was reduced and reorganised, the squadron added a prefix for their role, becoming 302 Signal Squadron (Infantry Brigade Group), though its role remained the same through these changes.

== Post-1967 ==
Finally, in 1967 as part of the 1966 Defence White Paper, the Territorial Army, and former Army Emergency Reserve (AER) were both disbanded and completely reorganised along new organisational lines. This resulted in the disbandment of all signal regiments, which were concurrently reduced to squadrons, adopting their old regimental number.

One of the new regiments was 40th (Ulster) Signal Regiment, which was formed through the amalgamation of the 66th (City of Belfast) Signal Regiment, 81st Signal Regiment (AER) and 302 Signal Squadron (Infantry Brigade Group). This new regiment consisted of a regimental headquarters, pipes and drums, and four squadrons, later reduced to just three. 302 Signal Squadron was itself redesignated as 85 (Ulster) Signal Squadron based in Clanover Park, Belfast and Lurgan.

In the squadron's role as part of 40th Signal Regiment, they would provide rear communications support to I (British) Corps in West Germany if mobilised. Eventually, as part of the 1998 Strategic Defence Review, the TA was again revamped and massively reduced. Although the squadron's role and size didn't change, it did gain a new lineage becoming 85 (Ulster and Antrim Artillery) Signal Squadron through the disbandment of the 74th (Antrim Artillery) Engineer Regiment. The squadron also moved location to Bangor, the location of the old 74th (AA) Engineer Regt's headquarters.

== Disbandment ==
In 2009 as part of the wider reorganisation of the Royal Corps of Signals, many of the old TA signal regiments were reduced to squadron size much like the 1966 reorganisations. Because of the removal of the old signal equipment, four regiments were disbanded, including 40th (Ulster) Signal Regiment. As part of the changes, the squadrons in these regiments were reduced to troops (platoon sized), with 40th (Ulster) Signal Regiment becoming 40 (Ulster) Signal Squadron in Belfast and Newtownards. This marked the disbandment of the squadron, and its lineage transferred to 591 (Antrim) Independent Field Squadron in the Royal Engineers, causing it to gain (Antrim Artillery) as their new subtitle.

In 2018, 40 (Ulster) Signal Squadron was reduced to 840 (Ulster) Signal Troop, and 69 (North Irish Horse) Signal Squadron redesignated as 40 (NIH) Sig Sqn in the same location. 40 Signal Squadron's headquarters are today in Clanover Park, Belfast the old location of 85 Signal Squadron.

== Uniform ==
On formation, the squadron adopted a unique uniform which consisted of the standard Royal Corps of Signals uniform in addition to the following: dark blue Caubeen with a hackle incorporated the corps colours.

== Cadet affiliations ==
The squadron maintained a number of cadet affiliations:

- Bangor Detachment, Army Cadet Force
- Dundonald Detachment, Army Cadet Force
- Bangor Grammar School Combined Cadet Force

== Footnotes ==
Notes

Citations
