= Antrim Artillery =

Auxiliary unit of the British Army

Antrim Artillery Militia 2nd Brigade, North Irish Division, RA Antrim Artillery (Southern Division) RA Antrim Royal Garrison Artillery (M)
- Active: November 1854–1919
- Country: United Kingdom
- Branch: Militia
- Role: Garrison Artillery
- Part of: Northern Irish Division, RA (1882–89); Southern Division, RA (1889–1902)
- Garrison/HQ: Carrickfergus Castle
- Engagements: Second Boer War; World War I

The Antrim Artillery was a part-time reserve unit of Britain's Royal Artillery based in County Antrim, Northern Ireland, from 1853 to 1919. It numbered 1st on the order of precedence of the Militia Artillery. Volunteers from the unit served in the Second Boer War. During World War I it defended Belfast Lough and trained gunners for service overseas. Subsequent units continued the Antrim Artillery traditions.

== Background ==
The long-standing national Militia of the United Kingdom was revived by the Militia Act 1852, enacted during a period of international tension. As before, units were raised and administered on a county basis, and filled by voluntary enlistment (although conscription by means of the Militia Ballot might be used if the counties failed to meet their quotas). Training was for 56 days on enlistment, then for 21–28 days per year, during which the men received full army pay. Under the Act, Militia units could be embodied by Royal Proclamation for full-time service in three circumstances:

1. 'Whenever a state of war exists between Her Majesty and any foreign power'.
2. 'In all cases of invasion or upon imminent danger thereof'.
3. 'In all cases of rebellion or insurrection'.

The 1852 Act introduced Militia Artillery units in addition to the traditional infantry regiments. Their role was to man coastal defences and fortifications, relieving the Royal Artillery (RA) for active service.

== History ==
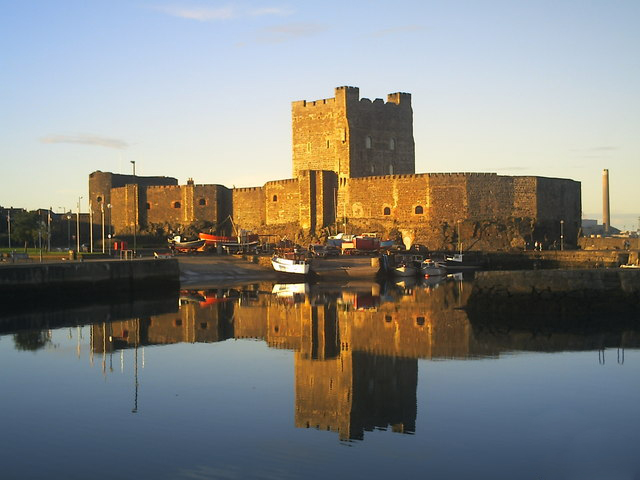
Carrickfergus Castle

The Antrim Militia Artillery was raised in November 1854. The first Lieutenant-Colonel Commandant was John Skeffington, 10th Viscount Massereene, KP (1812–1863), and the headquarters was established at Carrickfergus Castle.

Carrickfergus Castle's obsolete guns (6 × 64-pounders, 7 × 32-pounders and 1 × mortar, with an additional 6 × 24-pounders from 1859) were used for training, and the 64-pounders were fired on 27 May 1856 to salute the peace at the end of the Crimean War. A new headquarters was provided at the County Court House in Carrickfergus in September 1856, and in 1876 the War Department acquired land to erect permanent buildings for the militia at the castle. Clotworthy Skeffington, 11th Viscount Massereene, (1842–1905), the eldest son of the first commandant, was appointed Lt-Col on 20 November 1872, having served as major since 5 August 1865. Another early officer was the Hon Cecil Howard, a former captain in the 60th Rifles, who was commissioned as a captain in the unit on 26 July 1879 and was later promoted to major; he succeeded as 6th Earl of Wicklow in 1881.

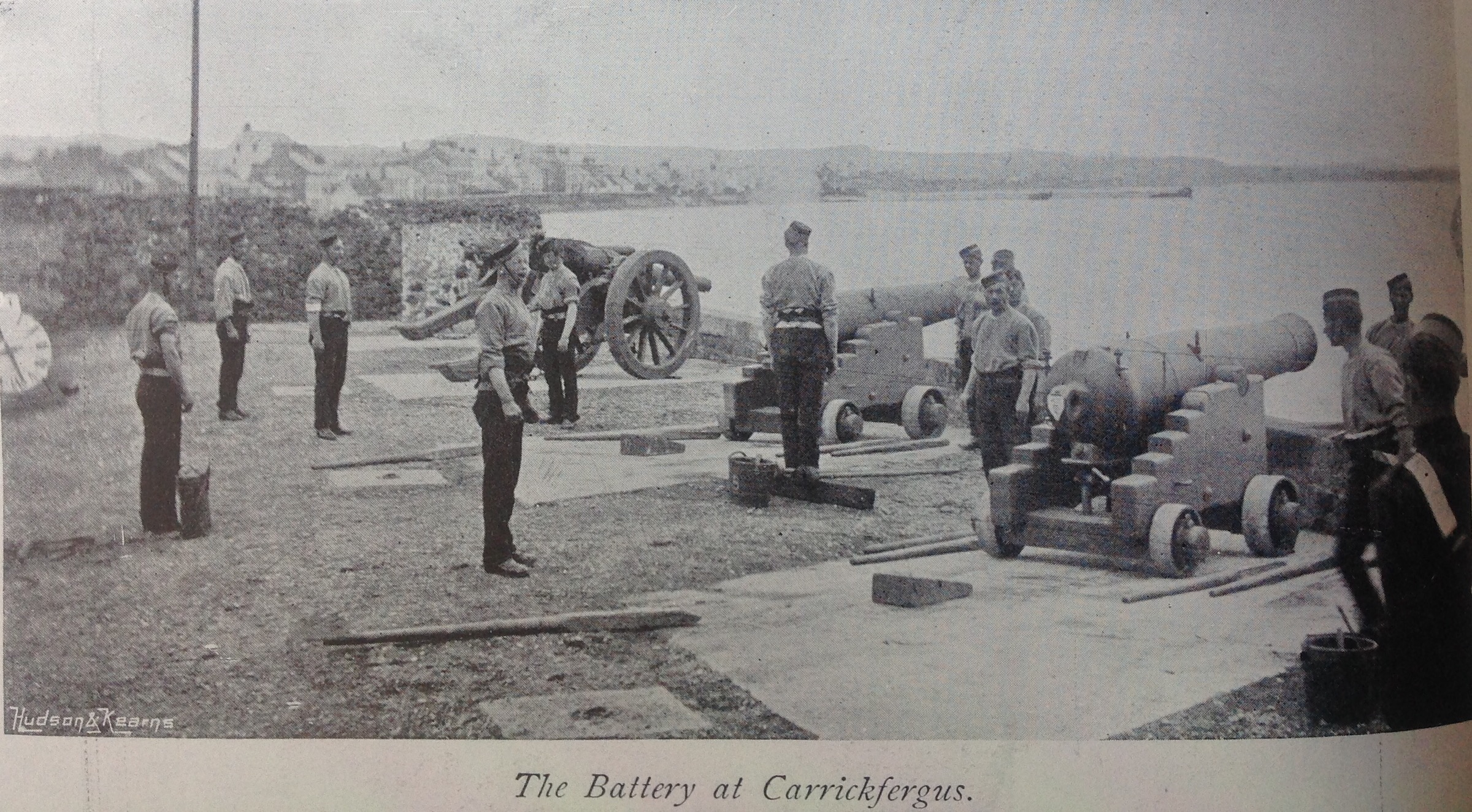
Antrim Militia Artillery at Gun practise at Carrickfergus castle, 1897

In the Mobilisation Scheme developed in the 1870s, the Antrim Artillery's war station was in the Tilbury Division of the Thames and Medway Defences. The Artillery Militia was reorganised into 11 divisions of garrison artillery on 1 April 1882, and the Antrim unit became the 2nd Brigade, North Irish Division, RA. When the North Irish Division was abolished on 1 July 1889 the title was altered to Antrim Artillery (Southern Division) RA.

In 1888 the ancient castle and obsolete guns at Carrickfergus were replaced by two modern batteries to defend Belfast Lough, armed with 6-inch BL and 9-inch RML guns to be manned by the Antrim Artillery.

At the end of the 19th century, the Antrim Artillery was largest militia artillery unit in Ireland, with 739 men enrolled (from an establishment of 980) in 1901. Recruiting was mainly from shipbuilders and agricultural labourers, and the average height of 5 ft 8 ins (1.73 m) was 2 ins (5 cm) greater than that laid down in regulations. The unit also possessed a band.

== Embodiments ==
The unit was embodied for home defence three times:

- Crimean War: 27 December 1854 to 21 May 1856. The unit volunteered for overseas service, but the offer was not accepted.
- Indian Mutiny: 5 April 1859 to 28 February 1861. The unit was first stationed at Kinsale and then at Aldershot in the summer briefly returning to the Curragh in Ireland and then spending the autumn and winter at Aldershot and Shorncliffe. It remained at Shorncliffe until August 1860 when it moved to Woolwich and then to Pembroke in September until it was disembodied the following year.
- Second Boer War: 8 May to 6 November 1900.

== South Africa ==
Under the Militia Acts, units could also volunteer for overseas service. The Antrim Artillery did so in 1900, and was one of the six Militia Artillery units permitted to form a Service Company of volunteers to serve in South Africa alongside the Regulars.

The service company of five officers and 153 other ranks embarked for South Africa in March 1900. There they combined with the service company of the Donegal Artillery to form the Irish Militia Artillery Brigade, RGA, under the command of Lt-Col Eldred Pottinger of the Antrim, with Major G.E. Elmitt in command of the Antrim Company. Lieutenant-Colonel Pottinger had been the Antrim's CO since 11 October 1890, and Maj Elmitt Instructor of Artillery since 27 February 1892.

The company's duties included escorting Boer prisoners of war to St Helena, and improving the defences of the Cape Peninsula and the Orange River Colony (ORC). While in the ORC the gunners constructed 'Fort Antrim', which the Inspector of Fortifications described as 'the finest bit of fortification in South Africa'. At the end of September 1900 a detachment of 25 Antrims joined a similar number of Donegals, all under the command of Capt F.H. Crawford, Adjutant of the Donegals, and proceeded to Orange River Station. There they took over the manning of three 7-pounder mountain guns and two Maxim guns, being relieved in mid-October by a similar detachment of Antrims and Donegals. While there, they took part in demolishing 32 miles (51 km) of railway lines to the north and laying land mines in the kopjes adjoining Zoutpans Drift.

The brigade left Cape Town for home in June 1901, having been relieved by the Norfolk Artillery Militia. The Antrim Artillery lost three gunners who died of disease during the campaign. Lieutenant-Colonel Pottinger, Maj Elmitt, Company Serjeant Major C.S. McCabe and Serjeant J. McIlwaine were all Mentioned in dispatches. In addition, Lt-Col Pottinger was awarded a CMG and CSM McCabe a DCM.

== Special Reserve ==
From 1902 most units of the Militia artillery formally became part of the Royal Garrison Artillery, the Antrim unit taking the title of Antrim RGA (M), changed to Antrim Royal Garrison Reserve Artillery on 19 July 1907.

After the Boer War, the future of the Militia was called into question. There were moves to reform the Auxiliary Forces (Militia, Yeomanry and Volunteers) to take their place in the six Army Corps proposed by St John Brodrick as Secretary of State for War. Some batteries of Militia Artillery were to be converted to field artillery. However, little of Brodrick's scheme was carried out.

Under the sweeping Haldane Reforms of 1908, the Militia was replaced by the Special Reserve, a semi-professional force whose role was to provide reinforcement drafts for Regular units serving overseas in wartime. Although the majority of RGA (M) units accepted conversion to Special Reserve Royal Field Artillery, most of these units were disbanded in March 1909. The exceptions were the Antrim and the Cork RGA (M), which remained in the RGA's order of battle in the absence of Territorial Force units in Irish Command. The unit took the title Antrim RGA (SR).

== World War I ==
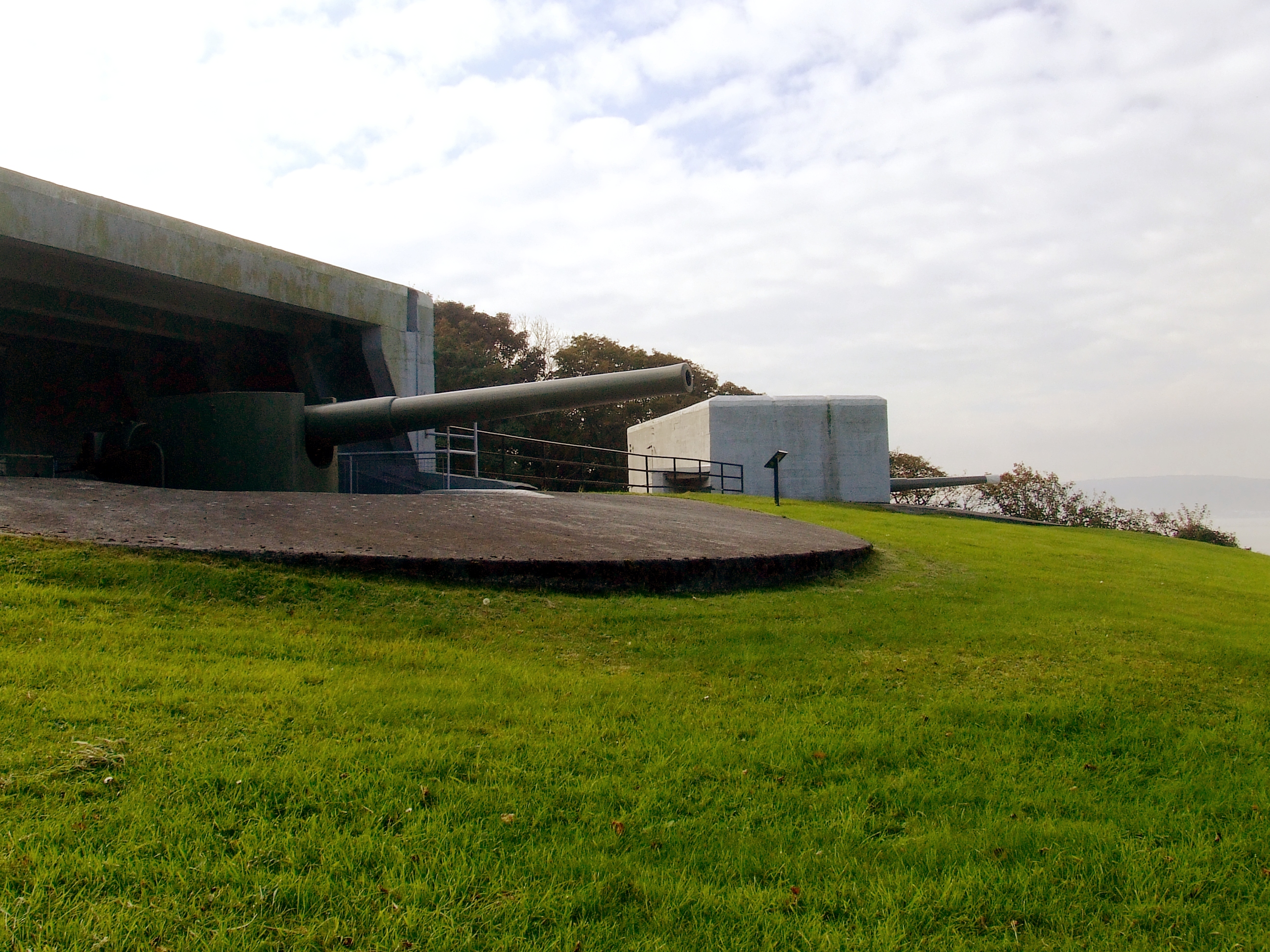
Grey Point Fort, with Mk VII 6-inch gun emplaced.

On the outbreak of World War I in August 1914, the North Irish Coast Defences comprised No 15 Company, RGA, at Derry, and the Antrim RGA (SR) at Carrickfergus. The Antrim RGA manned two Vickers-Maxim Mk VII 6-inch guns at Grey Point Fort, a new battery built at Helen's Bay on the south shore of Belfast Lough between 1904 and 1907.

At the outbreak of war the Antrim RGA had a strength of 607 all ranks, but as the war progressed and the likelihood of German attacks on the coast diminished, the Special Reserve's role of supplying and training reinforcement drafts for fighting units of the RGA took precedence. By August 1918 the unit had only 18 men on its books. In October 1918 Army Order 287 formed 'Fire Commands' in the coastal garrisons, which took over all the headquarters and units, whether Regular, Special Reserve, or Territorial Force. Together with No 15 Company RGA the Antrim RGA was split between Nos 34 (Antrim) and 35 (Donegal) Fire Commands at Belfast and Lough Swilly respectively.

After the Armistice with Germany all Special Reserve units were demobilised in 1919 and placed in suspended animation.

== Subsequent units ==
Although the Special Reserve remained in legal existence (reverting to the title of Militia in 1921) it was moribund. The 'Antrim Militia, RA', as it was termed from 1 June 1924, only had two officers listed by 1939. The militia was formally disbanded in 1953.

The title 'Antrim Artillery' was revived in 1937 when the first Territorial Army units formed in Northern Ireland included 188 (Antrim) Heavy Battery. This was expanded into the Antrim Heavy Regiment early in World War II and shortly afterwards designated 525th (Antrim) Coast Regiment.

In 1956 the coast artillery was disbanded, and the Antrim Artillery was converted into Royal Engineers (RE) as 146 (Antrim Artillery) Corps Engineer Regiment, RE. In 1961 the unit merged with 591 (Antrim) Field Squadron, Royal Engineers, to form 74 Engineer Regiment, including 114 (Antrim Artillery) Field Squadron. In 1967 the regiment was reduced to a single 74 (Antrim Artillery) Field Squadron, RE, which was eventually disbanded in 1999, and 85 (Ulster) Squadron, Royal Corps of Signals, became custodian of the Antrim Artillery property and adopted the subtitle '(Ulster and Antrim Artillery)'. A new 591 (Antrim Artillery) Field Squadron, RE, was formed at Bangor, County Down, in 2006 and continues the Antrim Artillery traditions.

== Honorary colonels ==
The following served as honorary colonel of the unit:

- Lord John Chichester (1811–1873), former MP for Belfast, appointed 16 June 1863
- Sir Richard Wallace, 1st Baronet (1818–1890) appointed 30 July 1873
- Colonel James McCalmont (1847–1913), formerly of the 8th King's Royal Irish Hussars and MP for Antrim East, appointed 4 November 1896
- Brigadier-General Anthony Ashley-Cooper, 9th Earl of Shaftesbury, KP, KCVO, (1869–1961), appointed 7 June 1913
