= 107th (Ulster) Brigade =

107 (Ulster) Brigade
- Insignia of 107 (Ulster) Brigade.
- Active: 1914–1919; 1947–1967; 1988–2006
- Country: United Kingdom
- Branch: British Army
- Part of: British Expeditionary Force; HQ Northern Ireland

The 107th Brigade, later 107th (Ulster) Brigade was an infantry formation of the British Army which saw service in the First World War. The brigade was later reformed during the Cold War and finally disbanded in 2006, following the drawdown of Operation Banner.

== History ==
=== World War I ===
The Brigade traces its historic title back to the First World War when the original 107th Infantry Brigade fought with distinction, alongside its sister formations of 108th Infantry Brigade and 109th Infantry Brigade, as the senior component of 36th (Ulster) Division. In September 1914 it was raised the 1st Brigade of that Division, but on 2 November 1914 it was renumbered 107. The 36th Division itself had been formed in September 1914 as part of the New Armies raised by Kitchener. It consisted of the old Ulster Volunteer Force, which had originally been raised to resist the imposition of Home Rule.

Casualties throughout the War meant that many of the original battalions were to be amalgamated or disbanded as hostilities continued. In early 1918, on re-organisation, 107 Brigade consisted of the 1st and 2nd (Regular) and the 15th (Service) Battalions of the Royal Irish Rifles. In March 1918 the 36th Division, in the St Quentin Sector, was part of the Fifth Army and it was upon this Army that the main weight of the German spring offensive fell. The retreat which followed ended on 29 March and the Ulster Division moved north to the Ypres Salient. It thereafter took part in the successful offensive operations, which culminated in the cessation of hostilities in November 1918.

The 36th Division was demobilised between January and June 1919, having suffered 32,186 casualties during the war.

==== Brigade commanders ====
Commanders were as follows:

- Brig Gen Couchman CB until 20 Oct 1915
- Brig Gen W M Withycombe CMG DSO until 7 Mar 1917
- Brig Gen F J M Rowley DSO until 2 Jun 1917
- Brig Gen W M Withycombe CMG DSO until 20 Apr 1918
- Brig Gen E I de S Thorpe CMG DSO until 18 Sep 1918
- Brig Gen H J Brock CB CMG DSO

==== Order of battle World War I ====
From 5 November 1915 to 3 February 1916, the 107th Brigade was attached to 4th Division

- 8th (Service) Battalion (East Belfast), Royal Irish Rifles (joined September 1914, 8th/9th Battalion from August 1917, disbanded February 1918)
- 9th (Service) Battalion (West Belfast), Royal Irish Rifles (joined September 1914, amalgamated with 8th Battalion August 1917)
- 10th (Service) Battalion (South Belfast), Royal Irish Rifles (joined September 1914, disbanded February 1918)
- 15th (Service) Battalion (North Belfast), Royal Irish Rifles (joined September 1914)
- 107th Brigade Machine Gun Company (joined 18 December 1915, moved into 36th Battalion, Machine Gun Corps on 1 March 1918)
- 107th Trench Mortar Battery (joined from 1 April 1916)
- 1st Battalion, Royal Irish Fusiliers (joined August 1917, left February 1918)
- 1st Battalion, Royal Irish Rifles (joined February 1918)
- 2nd Battalion, Royal Irish Rifles (joined February 1918)

=== Post-World War II ===
The second 107 Brigade was to be a Territorial Army formation. The Territorial Army throughout the United Kingdom was reconstituted in 1947 and, for the first time, there was a full scale TA organisation of all Arms in Ulster. Authority was given by the War Office for the formation on 1 January 1947 of 107 (Ulster) Independent Infantry Brigade (TA). Also at this time, Territorial infantry battalions of the three Regular infantry regiments of Northern Ireland were being formed, in addition to the various supporting Arms and Services.

==== Brigade commanders ====
- Brig Nelson Russell CB DSO MC Late The Royal Irish Fusiliers 1 Jan 1947
- Brig T P D Scott CBE DSO Late The Royal Irish Fusiliers 7 Jul 1950
- Brig A G Mackenzie-Kennedy CBE DSO Late The Royal Scots 20 Aug 1952
- Brig J Drummond DSO Late The Royal Ulster Rifles 20 Aug 1955
- Brig G Wort CBE Late The Wiltshire Regiment 30 Aug 1958
- Brig H L S Young DSO Late Irish Guards 30 Aug 1961
- Brig R C P Jeffries MBE Late The Royal Irish Fusiliers 12 Nov 1962
- Brig A J Dyball MC TD Late The Royal Ulster Rifles 2 Dec 1965 – 31 Mar 1967

==== Postwar order of battle ====
The brigade had the following composition in 1947:

- 107th Brigade Signal Squadron, Royal Corps of Signals, at Belfast
- 5th Battalion, Royal Inniskilling Fusiliers at Derry
- 6th Battalion, Royal Ulster Rifles at Belfast
- 5th Battalion, Royal Irish Fusiliers (Princess Victoria's) at Armagh
- 661st (Ulster) Field Regiment, Royal Artillery, at Bangor, County Down
- 591st (Antrim) Independent Field Squadron, Royal Engineers, at Bangor
- 601st Company, Royal Army Service Corps
- 107th Brigade Royal Army Ordnance Corps
- 107th Brigade Royal Electrical and Mechanical Engineers
- 107th Field Ambulance, Royal Army Medical Corps

=== Modern times ===
In July 1965 it became known that the reorganisation of the Territorial Army into the Territorial and Army Volunteer Reserve would entail the disbandment of 107 (Ulster) Brigade on 31 March 1967. This was part of the complete reorganisation, announced in the 1966 Defence White Paper, which abolished the former regimental and divisional structure of the Territorial Army.

A cell within Headquarters Northern Ireland then oversaw the administration of the Territorial Army in Northern Ireland until the decision was taken that 107 Brigade would again enter the British Army's Order of Battle and this took place on 2 November 1988. It was formed as an administrative headquarters to coordinate the TA units in Northern Ireland. It only became a deployable formation in the 1990s.

The Brigade merged on 15 December 2006 into the 39 Infantry Brigade, which was itself replaced by the new regional brigade headquarters, 38 (Irish) Brigade, on 1 August 2007.

== Bibliography ==
- Falls, Cyril (1922). The History of the 36th (Ulster) Division. Belfast and London, UK: M'Caw, Stevenson & Orr Limited The Linenhall Press. p. 359 pages.
- Gailey, Gillespie and Hassett (1979). An Account of the Territorials in Northern Ireland 1947–1978. Belfast, UK: Territorial, Auxiliary and Volunteer Reserve Association for Northern Ireland. p. 96 pages. ASIN B001OJWW98.
