= 74 Engineer Regiment (United Kingdom) =

74th (Antrim Artillery) Engineer Regiment
- Active: 1967 - 1994 (regiment); 1995 - Present (squadron)
- Country: United Kingdom
- Branch: Army
- Type: Engineers
- Role: Military Engineering
- Size: Regiment
- Garrison/HQ: Bangor

The 74th Engineer Regiment was a former Territorial Army regiment of the Royal Engineers, British Army. Initially the 74th (Antrim Artillery) Engineer Regiment was a reserve engineer regiment, but was then disbanded in 1994. An independent squadron remained. As part of Army 2020 the squadron moves to become part of the 71st Engineer Regiment.

== History ==
The 74th (Antrim Artillery) Engineer Regiment was formed in 1967 in the dramatic reduction and reorganisation of the Territorial Army. It originally was created by the merger of two existing units: 146 (Antrim Artillery) Corps Engineer Regiment, Royal Engineers and 591 (Antrim) Independent Field Squadron. Its first headquarters till its disbandment was at Belfast. The regiment was assigned to the 8th Engineer Brigade the majority of its history from 1967 - 1992. In 1994 the regiment was disbanded, but a single squadron remained, becoming the 74 Independent Field Squadron (V), later 591 Independent Squadron at Bangor. Today the regiment has its traditions carried on by 591 (Antrim Artillery) Field Squadron which is still headquartered at Bangor. As part of Army 2020 the squadron is planned to join the 71st (Northern) Reserve Engineer Regiment, Royal Engineers, remaining at the same location.

== Organization ==
Locations:
Squadron Location

The regiment's structure changed very little but did have a few changes. The structure just before the disbandment is:

- Headquarters Squadron
- 112 (Antrim Fortress) Field Squadron
- 114 (Antrim Artillery) Field Squadron
- 272 (West Riding) Field Squadron

At some time the regiment also controlled the following units:

- 591 Field Squadron
- Ballymena Troop
- Bangor Troop
- Carrickfergus Troop
- Antrim Troop
- Regimental Pipes and Drums, 74th Engineer Regiment
