= Spitbank Fort =

Sea fort located in the Solent, near Portsmouth, England

- Solent, England
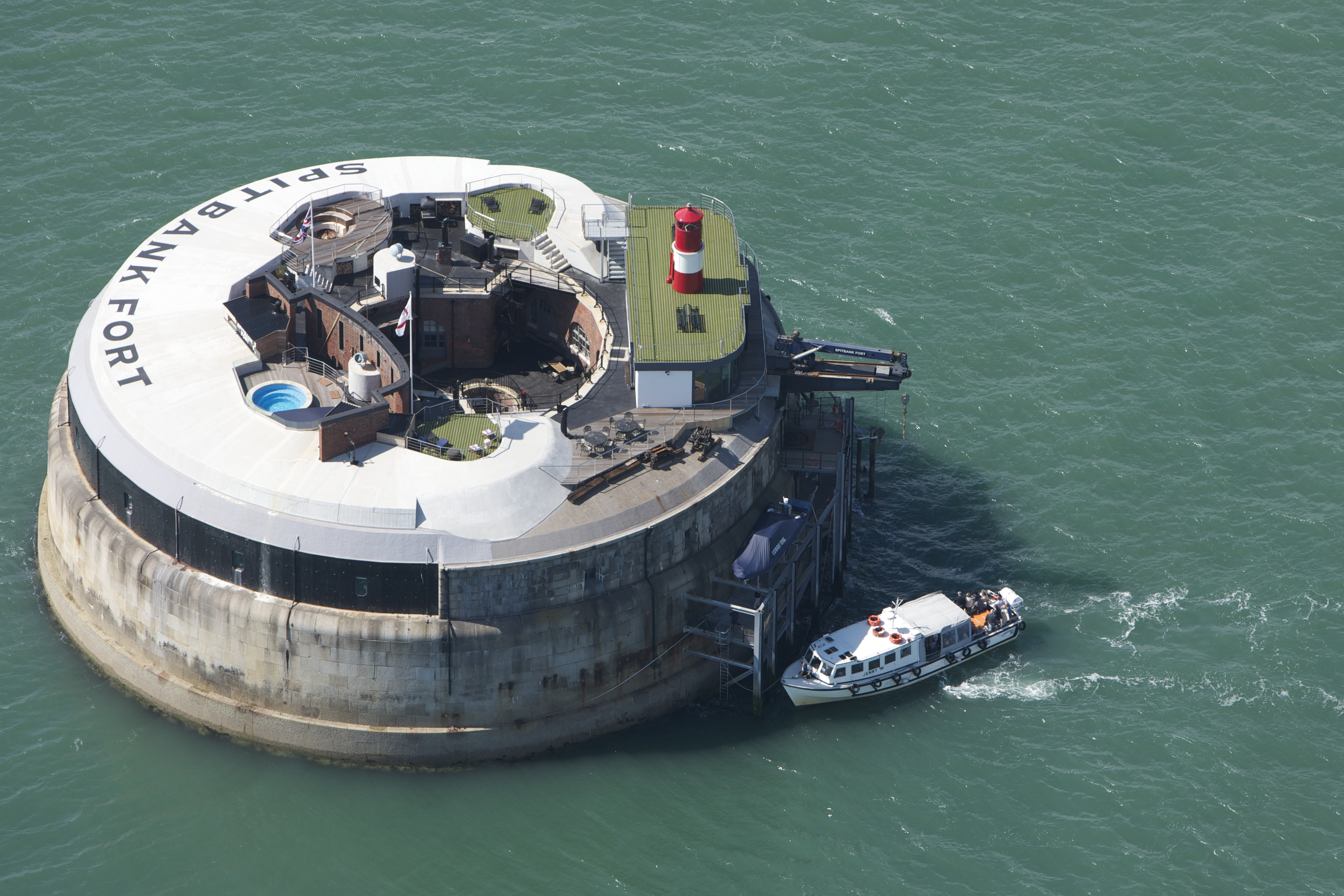
- Spitbank Fort

Site information
- Type: Fort
- Open to the public: No

Scheduled monument
- Official name: Spitbank Fort
- Designated: 21 January 1999
- Reference no.: 1018587
- Condition: Complete

Location
- Location within Hampshire
- Coordinates: 50°46′13.6″N 1°5′56.7″W

Site history
- Built: 1861–1878
- In use: 1878–1956

Spitbank Fort or Spitsand Fort or Spit Sand Fort or simply Spit Fort is a sea fort built as a result of the 1859 Royal Commission. The fort is one of four built as part of the Palmerston Forts constructions. Located in the Solent, near Portsmouth, England, and is now in private ownership following its sale after a period as a luxury hotel.

== History ==
=== 1878–1956: Active naval installation ===
The four armour-plated forts were designed by Captain E. H. Stewart overseen by Assistant Inspector General of Fortifications, Colonel W. F. D. Jervois. Construction started in 1867, and was completed in 1878, at a cost of £167,300 STG.

Spitbank is smaller than the two main Solent forts, Horse Sand Fort and No Man's Land Fort. Its main purpose was as a further line of defence for ships that made it past the two main forts. It is 49.4 metres (162 ft) in diameter across at its base, with one floor and a basement and armour plating only on the seaward side. It was originally planned to have been armed with nine 10" 18-ton rifled muzzle loader (RML) guns on the seaward side, and six 7" seven-ton RML guns on the landward side. However, by the time of completion the plan had changed so that the seaward side received nine 12.5-inch muzzle-loading (RML) guns. From 1884 more modern 12-inch breechloading guns were installed and these were in service until after World War I.

In 1898 the role of the fort was changed to defend against light craft and the roof was fitted out with two 4.7" guns and searchlights. In the early 1900s all but three original large guns were removed. Minor upgrades to the smaller guns and searchlights continued through the years. A 2020 report stated that during the Second World War, "the forts were used to defend the Portsmouth dockyards. Life on site was grim; those serving were deliberately chosen for their inability to swim, to avoid any attempt to escape".

=== 1956–1982: Disused ===
The fort remained unused after the abolition of coastal artillery in 1956. The fort was declared surplus to requirements in 1962, and put up for sale the following year unsuccessfully. The fort was declared a Scheduled Monument in 1967. The Ministry of Defence sold the fort to a private buyer in 1982, amid other defence spending cuts in the early 1980s.

=== 1982–2009: Museum ===
Following the purchase of the fort, it underwent restoration and was opened to the public as a museum.

Beginning June 4, 2002 the fort was used as a location for Banged Up With Beadle. For six weeks British TV personality Jeremy Beadle was locked in its dungeons. Cameras followed him as he coped with survival, plus learning skills with a different member of the public each week. These skills were put to the test as a live insert each Saturday evening into Ant & Dec's Saturday Night Takeaway. It was the venue for the Coalition Festival in the summer of 2009, and other psytrance and hard dance parties.

=== 2012–2020: Hotel ===
In 2009 it was put on sale for £800,000 but was sold before auction, reportedly for more than £1m. The fort was remodelled, with works reportedly costing around £2.6 million, and opened in 2012 as a luxury spa hotel and retreat with nine bedroom suites.

A 2018 report however, stated that Spitbank, "largely undamaged, has been protected from inappropriate development by its status ... as a Scheduled Ancient Monument and the designers have been scrupulously careful to preserve ... all the fitments...". At the time, the "9-suite Spitbank ... [was] spectacularly open for business, whether overnight stays, corporate events or weddings". Events for up to 60 guests could be accommodated, "during the day, but most would have to leave on the last boat".

In 2020, use of the hotel was suspended due to the coronavirus pandemic. The hotel was unable to reopen as other English hotels did in July, "due to their unique requirements in both transportation and sanitisation requirements".

=== 2020–Present ===
All three Clarenco Forts were listed for sale in July of 2020. Spitbank Fort was described as a "33,000 sq ft boutique retreat on three floors". On September 14, 2020, Pendulum recorded a concert at Spitbank Fort to promote their new single Driver/Nothing for Free that was streamed live on YouTube on October 2, 2020.

In 2022, the defunct hotel was featured in episode 1 of World's Most Incredible Hotels. The footage was filmed before the hotel’s closing.

In June 2024 the fort sold at auction for £1,010,000 to a buyer that was unidentified at the time.

In July 2025, an injunction was granted to prevent urban explorers from trespassing on the fort, which is owned by Fortify Solent.
