= No Man's Land Fort =

Grade II listed sea fort in the Solent, UK

- Solent, England
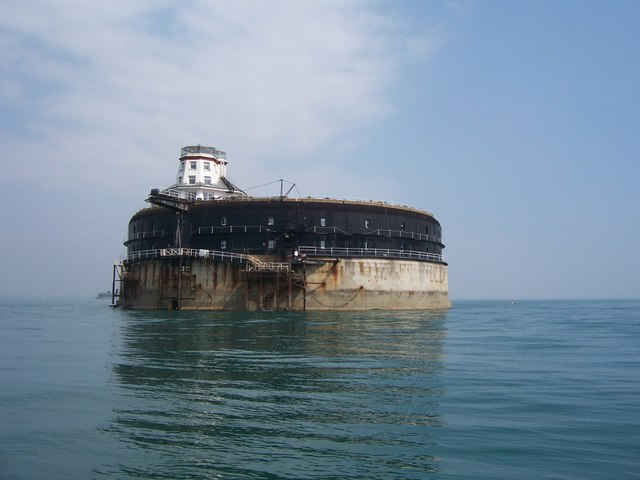
- No Man's Land Fort

Site information
- Type: Fort
- Owner: Edward Ward
- Open to the public: Yes

Scheduled monument
- Official name: No Mans Land Fort
- Designated: 12 Jun 1967
- Reference no.: 1018589
- Condition: Complete

Location
- Coordinates: 50°44′23.7″N 1°5′42.78″W

Site history
- Built: 1867–1880

No Man's Land Fort, also referred to as No Man's Fort, is a sea fort in the Solent, near Portsmouth, England. It is one of the Palmerston Forts built between 1867 and 1880 after the recommendations of the 1859 Royal Commission. It is 200 ft (61 m) in diameter, and lies 1.4 miles (2.3 km; 1.2 nmi) off the coast of the Isle of Wight.

== History ==
The fort was designed by Captain E. H. Stewart, overseen by Assistant Inspector General of Fortifications, Colonel W. F. D. Jervois. Construction work began in 1865, and the fort was completed in 1880, long after the threat of a seaborne invasion from France had passed, at a cost of £462,500.

A 2020 report stated that during the Second World War, "the forts were used to defend the Portsmouth dockyards. Life on site was grim; those serving were deliberately chosen for their inability to swim, to avoid any attempt to escape".

No Man's Land Fort is almost identical to Horse Sand Fort. It has been used as a luxury home/hospitality centre for high-paying guests – due to the privacy it offers – with an indoor swimming pool and two helipads. In July 2004, Legionella bacteria found in the hotel's water system forced its closure. The Fort was put up for sale in 2005 and again in 2007, but the company collapsed. In March 2008, Harmesh Pooni, claiming to still be the owner, barricaded himself inside the fort in protest against the administrators KPMG.

== Refurbishing as hotel ==
The property was eventually sold by KPMG for £910,000 in March 2009. In March 2012, it was purchased by Clarenco LLP who also purchased Spitbank Fort and Horse Sand Fort, with the intention of refurbishing it as a hotel. The fort opened as a hotel in April 2015.

An October 2018 report stated that "the 22-suite No Man’s [was] open for business, whether overnight stays, corporate events or weddings".

In 2020, No Man's Land Fort, Spitbank Fort and Horse Sand Fort were listed for sale. No Man's Fort was described as a "99,000 sq ft hotel, restaurant and leisure complex on four floors, including a helipad". It was sold at auction in 2024 for slightly over a £1 million. The buyer is Londoner Edward Ward who claimed that the Fort is an impulse buy and he is looking for an operator for No Man's Land Fort.

== In popular culture ==
The 1972 Doctor Who serial The Sea Devils used the fort as a filming location for several scenes.
