= Grey Point Fort =

Military installation in Helen's Bay, County Down

- Helen's Bay, County Down, Northern Ireland
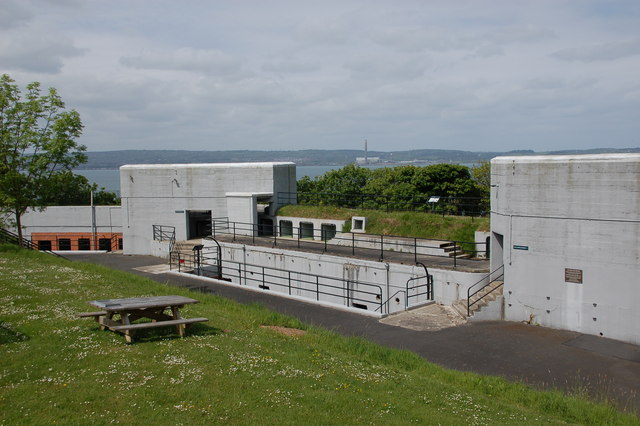
- Rear view of Grey Point Fort showing the two gun positions on either side of the central magazine area.

Site information
- Controlled by: Northern Ireland Environment Agency
- Open to the public: Yes
- Condition: Intact

Site history
- Built: 1904-1907
- Built by: W J Campbell and Son, Belfast
- In use: Preserved: State Care Monument of Northern Ireland
- Materials: Concrete; Earth

Grey Point Fort (map reference J45698325) is a battery located at Helen's Bay on the south side of Belfast Lough. It was part of the defences of Belfast.

Construction of the battery began in 1904, with the guns mounted by 1907. The construction of the battery and another battery on the opposite side of the Lough at Kilroot was noted by the Owen Report of 1905.

The battery was armed with two 6-inch Mark VII Breech loading guns. During the First World War additional buildings were constructed to provide accommodation for men of Kitchener's Army. Following the war, the battery remained in use with two coastal defence search lights being installed in 1936.

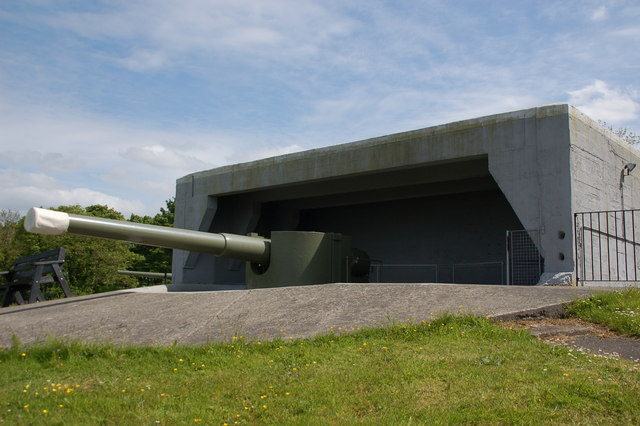
6-inch Breech Loading gun at Grey Point Fort

During the Second World War, it was operated by a Territorial Army unit, the 525th (Antrim) Coast Regiment, Royal Artillery. Concrete overhead covers were added to both gun positions. Following the war. the battery continued to be maintained with a mobile radar being installed in 1954.

On the abolition of coast artillery in 1956 the fort was disarmed. Between 1992 and 1996 original guns were obtained and installed from fortifications in Cork – one from Fort Mitchel on Spike Island, County Cork and the other from Fort Davis, County Cork. Since 2008 the Fort has been opened by the Grey Point Amateur Radio Society.

== Publications ==
- Clements, Bill, 2003. Defending the North:The Fortifications of Ulster 1796-1956, Colourpoint Books, Gosport. ISBN 1904242073
