= Horse Sand Fort =

Sea fort in the Solent off Portsmouth, Hampshire, England

- Solent, England
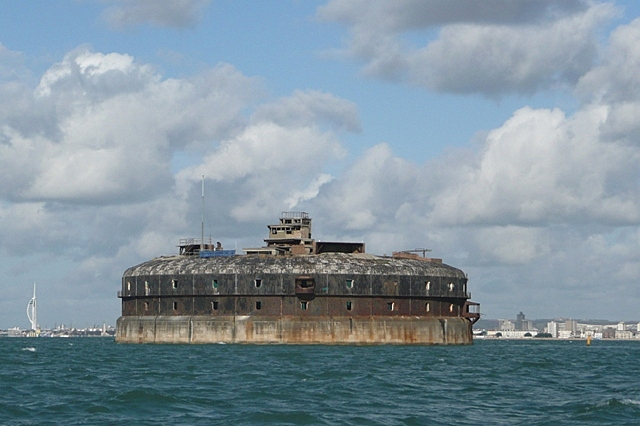
- Horse Sand Fort

Site information
- Type: Fort
- Owner: AmaZing Venues
- Open to the public: No

Scheduled monument
- Official name: Horse Sand Fort
- Designated: 12 June 1967
- Reference no.: 1018588
- Condition: Complete

Location
- Location within Hampshire
- Coordinates: 50°45′0.0″N 1°4′21.17″W

Site history
- Built: 1865–1880

Horse Sand Fort
- Headquarters: United Kingdom
- Website: SolentForts.com

Horse Sand Fort or Horse Sands Fort is one of the larger Royal Commission sea forts in the Solent off Portsmouth, Hampshire, England. The fort is one of four built as part of the Palmerston Forts constructions. It is 200 feet (61 m) across, built between 1865 and 1880, with two floors and a basement and armour-plated all round.

== History ==
Horse Sand Fort was designed by Captain E. H. Stewart, overseen by Assistant Inspector General of Fortifications, Colonel W. F. D. Jervois. Construction work began in 1865, and the fort was completed in 1880, long after the threat of a seaborne invasion from France had passed, at a cost of £424,694.

The original armament was to have been forty five 10-inch and 44 12.5-inch rifled muzzle-loading (RML) guns on the gun floors with 10 12-inch RMLs mounted on the roof in five turrets. In fact the turrets were never built and the limited space meant the 12.5-inch guns had to be operated with less than full charges of powder. In 1882, 12-inch rifled breech-loading guns were placed in alternate bays.

Horse Sand Fort was built on a ring of masonry consisting of large concrete blocks with an outer skin of granite blocks, the interior being filled with clay and shingle and covered with a thick layer of concrete. The lower foundation walls of the fort are 18 metres (59 ft) thick. The fort is split into three levels with the top measuring 62.4 metres (204 ft 9 in) in diameter. The floors would have originally provided storage of armoury and guns and the things needed to sustain the men that were stationed on site. The top of the fort consisted of a lighthouse and various chimneys and ventilators. The fort has its own artesian well which provided fresh water. The seaward side of the fort was covered in a heavy iron-armoured plating to protect it from seaborne attack. Access to the fort was by a wooden-decked landing stage supported on cast-iron piles.

In the late 19th century the Solent forts were painted in a black and white chequered paint scheme as an early form of dazzle camouflage. In its unrestored state remains of this pattern are still visible on parts of Horse Sand Fort.

Beginning in 1908, extensive submerged defences were built in the form of large concrete blocks running about 1.8 metres (5.9 ft) below sea level from the fort to the shore at Southsea. With only two narrow gaps to allow small craft to pass through, this barrier (and a much shorter one running south from No Man's Land Fort towards Ryde Sands) remains as the cost of demolition is deemed too high. A 2020 report stated that during the WW II, "the forts were used to defend the Portsmouth dockyards. Life on site was grim; those serving were deliberately chosen for their inability to swim, to avoid any attempt to escape".

In March 2012, the fort was purchased by Clarenco LLP (previously known as Amazing Retreats) (which also owned No Man's Land Fort and Spitbank Fort) and was to be converted into a museum. In 2015, it was reported that Clarenco planned to open Horse Sand Fort for public use the following year, but that did not occur and by 2019, it was expected that Horse Sand, No Man's Land Fort and Spitbank Fort would be put up for auction.

An October 2018 report stated that restoration work on Horse Sands Fort was delayed "by the presence of a resident family of peregrine falcons". In 2020, all three Clarenco-owned Forts were listed for sale. A news item stated that Horse Sand Fort was "a blank canvas, with 100 chambers and living quarters, plus the original gun carriage". In October 2021, it was announced that the fort had been sold to an unnamed buyer for £715,000.

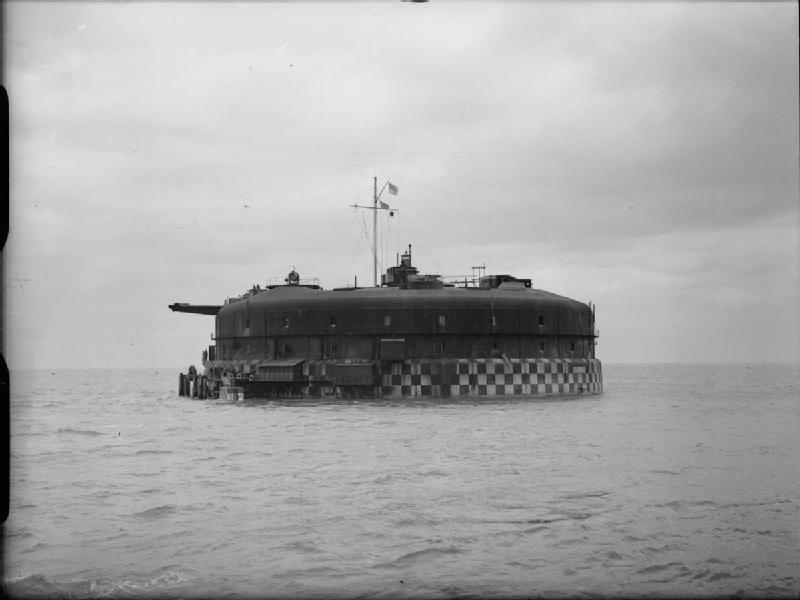
Horse Sand Fort in 1940

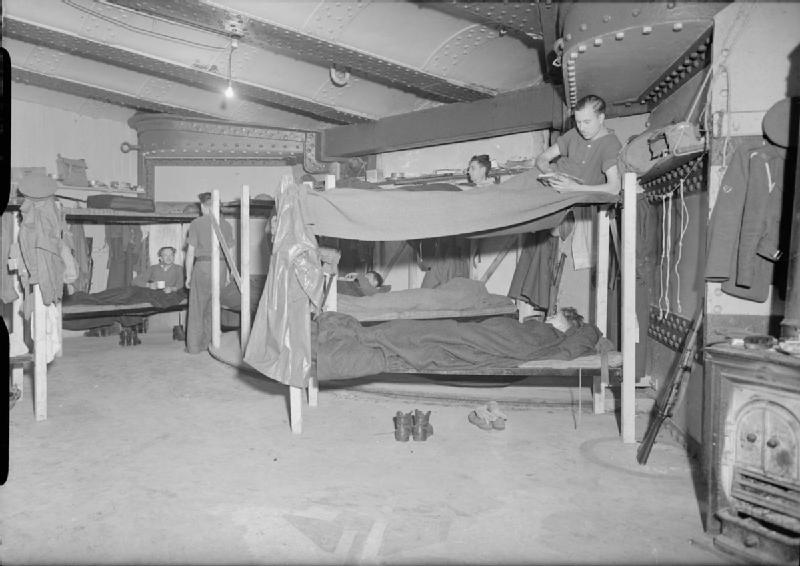
Other ranks sleeping quarters in Horse sands sea fort, 1940

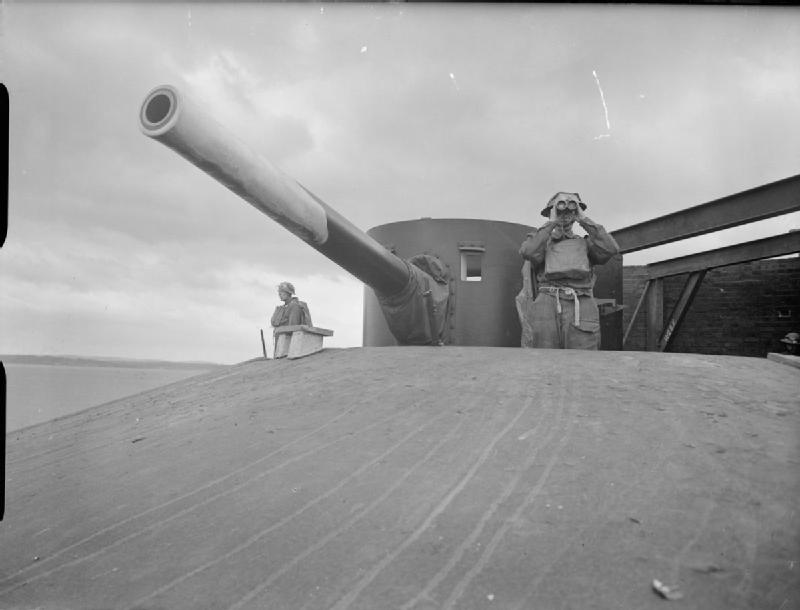
6-inch Breech Loading (BL) gun on top of Horse Sand Fort, 1940 (IWM H 4618)

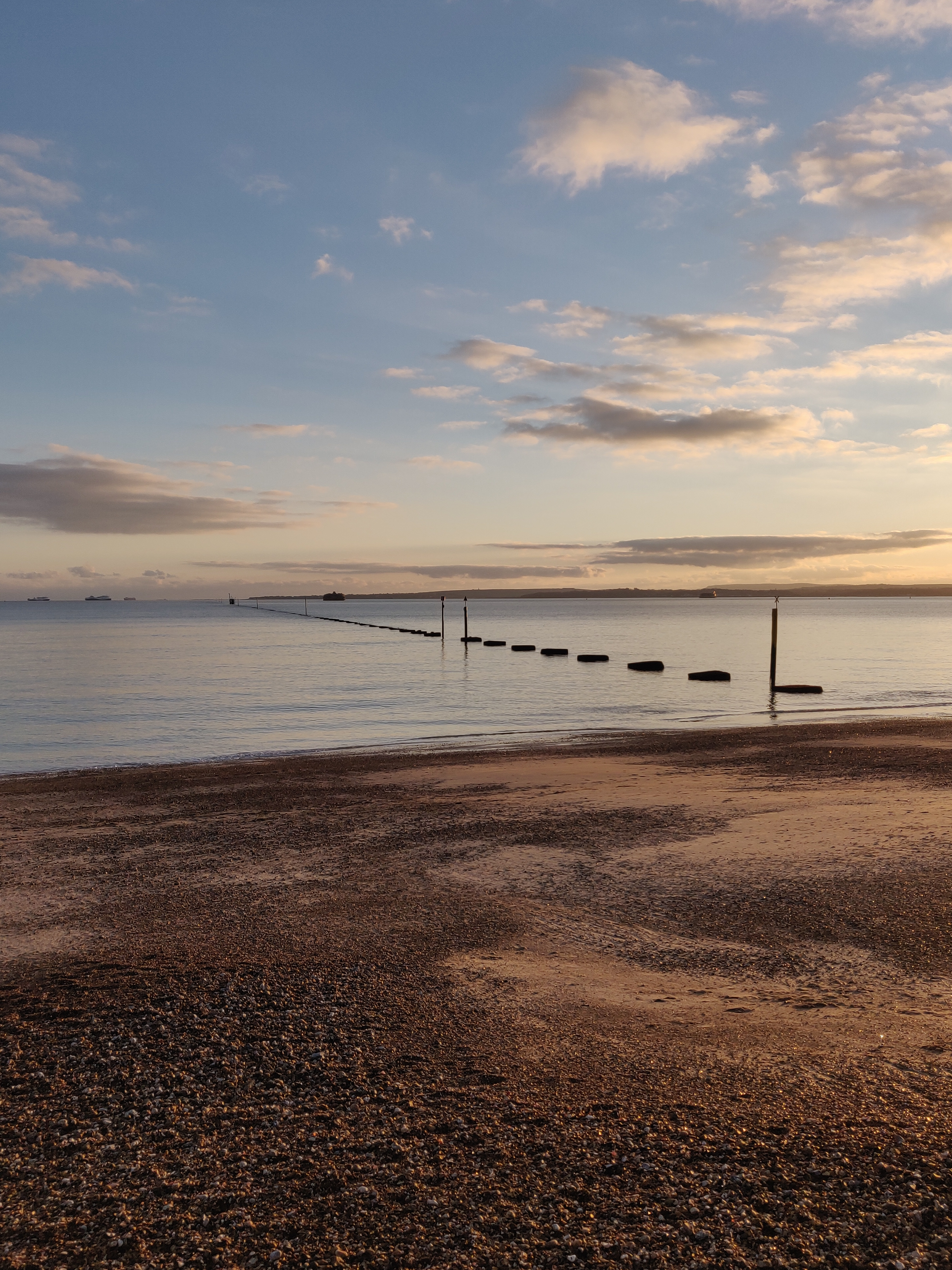
Submerged barrier from Southsea to Horse Sand Fort
