= 40th (Ulster) Signal Regiment =

40th (Ulster) Signal Regiment (Volunteers)
- Royal Signals Cap Badge
- Active: 1967-2010
- Country: United Kingdom
- Branch: Territorial Army
- Type: Royal Corps of Signals
- Role: National Communications; Regional ICP Support
- Size: 3 Squadrons
- Part of: 2 (National Communications) Signal Brigade; 38 (Irish) Brigade
- Motto(s): Certa Cito (“Swift and Sure”)
- Colours: Sky Blue, Navy and Green (Air, Sea and Land)
- March: Quick - Begone Dull Care; Slow - HRH (Princess Royal)
- Mascot(s): Mercury (“Jimmy”)

Commanders
- Colonel in Chief: The Princess Royal
- Honorary Colonel: Lord Rogan

Insignia
- Tactical Recognition Flash

40 (Ulster) Signal Regiment (Volunteers) was a Territorial Army regiment in the Royal Corps of Signals in the British Army. The regiment formed part of 2 (National Communications) Signal Brigade, providing military communications for national operations. The regiment did not have an internal security role in Northern Ireland.

== History ==
The Regiment was formed 1 April 1967 in Belfast by the amalgamation of 66 Signal Regiment (TA), 81 Signal Regiment (AER) and 302 Signal Squadron. Due to the reduction in Territorial Army Royal Signals units, as a result of the Strategic Review of Reserves, the regiment was disbanded on 31 March 2010. 66 Squadron and 69 Squadron were transferred to the command of 32 Signal Regiment.

== Structure ==
The structure in 2010 was as follows:

- 66 (City of Belfast) Support Squadron at Clonaver Park, Belfast.
- 69 Signal Squadron at Belfast and Limavady.
- 85 (Ulster and Antrim Artillery) Signal Squadron at Lisburn.
