= HMS Conqueror (1881) =

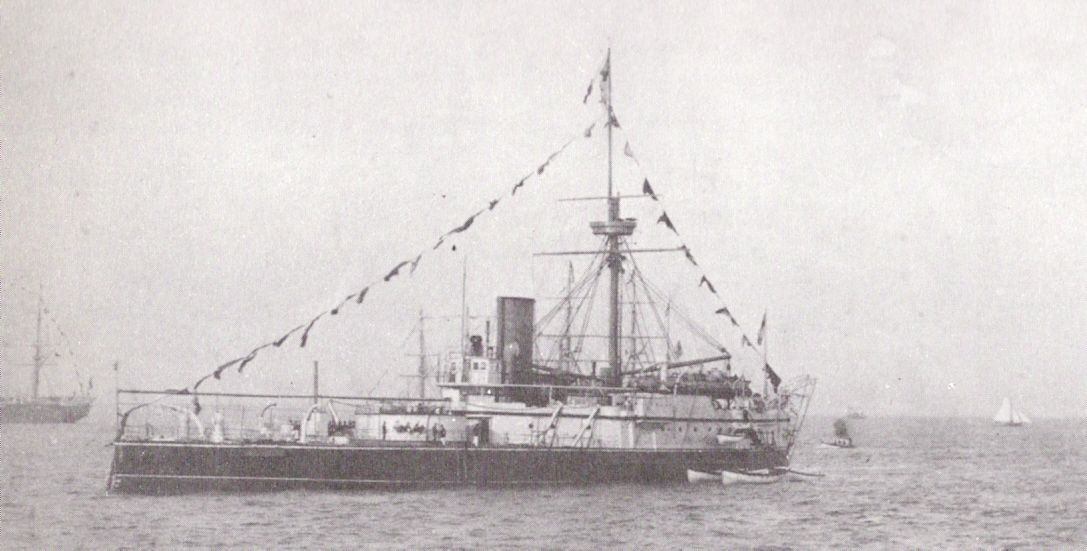
- HMS Conqueror as she appeared upon completion in 1886.

History

United Kingdom
- Name: HMS Conqueror
- Builder: Chatham Dockyard
- Laid down: 28 April 1879
- Launched: 8 September 1881
- Completed: March 1886
- Fate: Broken up 1907

General characteristics
- Displacement: 6,200 tons
- Length: 270 ft (82.3 m) p/p; 288 ft (87.8 m) o/a
- Beam: 58 ft (18 m)
- Draught: 22 ft (6.7 m) light; 24 ft 3 in (7.4 m) deep load
- Propulsion: 2-shaft Humphreys & Tennant inverted compound; 4,500 IHP
- Speed: 14 knots
- Complement: 330 men
- Armament: Armoured ram; 2 BL 12-inch (305 mm) guns Mk II, replaced by Mk III in 1886/7; 4 × BL 6-inch (152 mm) guns; 7 × QF 6-pounder (57 mm) guns; 6 torpedo tubes
- Armour: Belt: 12 inches tapering to 8 inches; Citadel: 12 inches to 10.5 inches; Turret: 14 inches face, 12 inches sides; Conning tower: 12 inches to 6 inches; Bulkhead: 11 inches; Deck: 2.5 inches to 1.25 inches

HMS Conqueror was an ironclad battleship of the Victorian Royal Navy, whose main armament was an armoured ram.

She was the first ship of the Conqueror class to be laid down, her only sister-ship being HMS Hero, which was completed some two years later. At the time of her design it was thought that ramming attacks were the most effective offensive manoeuvre against armoured warships, as the armour of the period was, for a short time, able to defend against the majority of contemporary guns extant. This belief was reinforced by the action at the battle of Lissa, when the Austrian battleship Ferdinand Max rammed and sank the Italian Re D'Italia. The Italian ship was at the time a stationary target, a detail which it appears did not receive, in naval architects' minds, the attention it deserved.

== Characteristics ==
=== Hull ===
Conqueror was characterized as a steel armored turret ship and ram. Her length was 270 ft (82.3 m), beam was 53 ft (16.2 m), and draught was to be 23 ft (7.0 m). Displacement was estimated as 6,200 tons. The engines would develop 4,500 IHP, giving a speed of 13 knots.

=== Armor ===
Conqueror was innovative for being made of steel and using steel-faced iron armor (instead of only iron). The main belt was 12 inches thick at the waterline and 11 inches on the battery. The turret had armor of 12 to 14 inches in thickness. The deck armor was steel plating of 2-3 inches in thickness.

The new steel-faced iron armor was thought to be worth an additional 25% of iron armor. Which would mean that 12-14 inches of steel-faced armor were equivalent to 14-18 inches of iron armor.

=== Armament ===
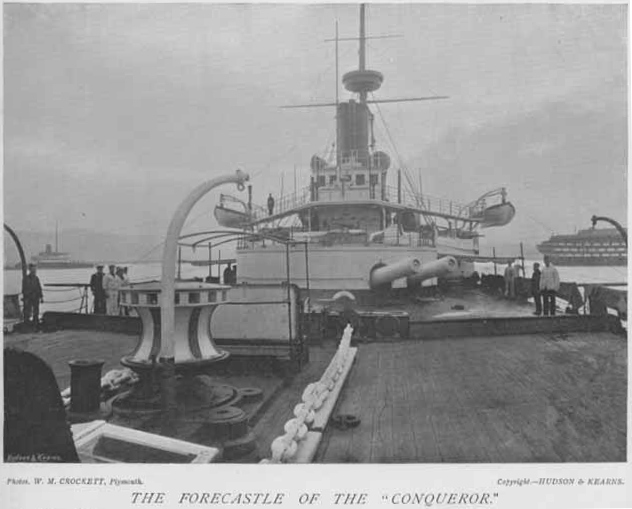
HMS Conqueror's forecastle and 12-inch (305-mm) guns.

Conqueror was also innovative for using breech-loading guns. The two main 12-inch (305-mm) calibre were placed in a turret and could fire over a clear upper deck from about 50 feet abaft the beam on one side to the same position on the other side. However, the guns were placed very near to the deck, and it was found that a discharge over the bow caused marked blast damage to the deck and associated fittings. Firing abaft the beam caused blast damage to the bridge and superstructure, so in practice the guns could only fire on the beam, through an arc of some 45 degrees. The heavy artillery was only intended to be used against a target which was on Conqueror's beam evading a ramming attack.

Conqueror's main breech-loading guns were two BL 12-inch Mk II naval guns. They were of 12-inch (305-mm) calibre, and were 27.5 calibres (27.5 feet) long. They fired a shell weighing 714 pounds (324 kg) with a full charge of 295-pound (134 kg) of brown prismatic pulver. This resulted in a muzzle velocity of 1,910 ft/second (582 m/second). At this velocity, they could penetrate 10 inches (254 mm) of armour if the shell struck at or near a ninety-degree angle; much less, however, in the much more likely event of an oblique impact.

However that might be, the Mark II gun suffered from very severe production problems. By October 1884, the guns for Conqueror were expected to be finally ready by January 1885. Collingwood (1882) had four of the same guns mounted 'en barbette' and successfully tested her front guns in March 1885. Over a year later, in May 1886, she then tested her aft guns. With a reduced charge, one of these burst on the first shot.

On board Collingwood, the blast caused the part of the gun in front of the trunnions break off and was blasted overboard. There were no casualties, but in 1879, a similar burst had occurred in a turret on HMS Thunderer, killing 11 and wounding 35. The Collingwood incident led to the order to only use the Mark II guns in case of emergency. However, as the guns on board Conqueror were in a turret, even emergency use was unlikely.

Conqueror was then re-armed with the 12-inch Mk III naval gun. Immediately after the May 1885 Collingwood incident, six all steel 12-inch guns meant for land service were re-designated for use on board ships. These were expected to be ready in 3-4 months. This was not to be, because in August 1886, the guns were expected to be mounted on Conqueror by mid-October 1886.

The smaller guns were intended for use against small targets which could evade the ram and were not worth using the heavy artillery for. The torpedo tubes - six was the greatest number carried to date by a battleship - were placed aft and were intended for use against a target placed by accident or design astern of Conqueror, when the main armament would be valueless.

== Service history ==
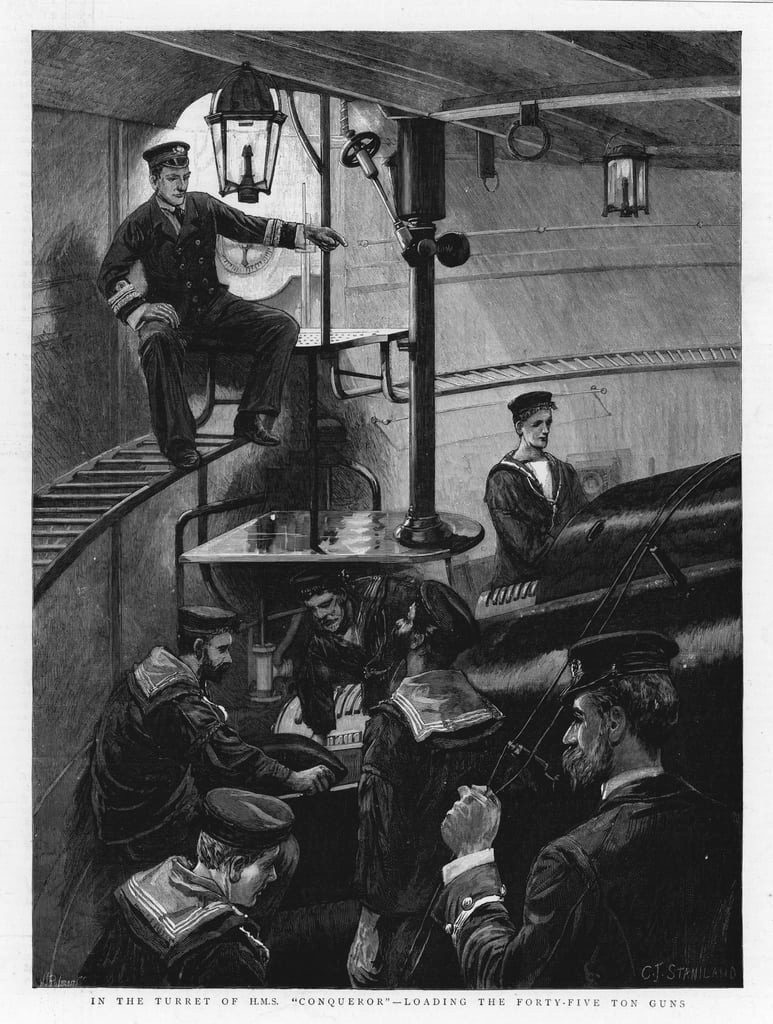
In the Turret of HMS Conqueror, loading the Forty-Five Ton Guns. The Graphic 1890

HMS Conqueror was launched on 8 September 1881. This was done by floating her out of dock. By then, she was expected not to be ready to be commissioned for some time. However, this would become a much longer time than expected. By September 1884, Conqueror was still not ready, but orders were given to hasten her completion so she could be commissioned. In mid-December 1884 she was reported to be nearly ready.

In March 1885 the Earl of Ravensworth, president of Institution of Naval Architects, spoke at some length about recent construction of warships. He said that the introduction of the breechloading guns caused most of the delays in construction. He mentioned that in 1884, he saw the apparently finished Conqueror at Chatham, and was told that she could not be commissioned, because she was waiting for the breech screws of her guns. He also said that he was told that Conqueror was still there, complete in every respect, but waiting for her screws.

In August 1885, Conqueror returned to Chatham after her gun trials at Sheerness. Conqueror was said to have been completed in March 1886. However, as mentioned above, the 4 May 1886 burst of the Mark II gun on board Collingwood, made that in a practical sense, Conqueror was no longer ready for commissioning. Her new Mark III guns were only installed in late 1886 or early 1887. By then, it was hoped that she would be finished in the course of the summer.

Conqueror was commissioned on 5 July 1887 for the Jubilee Review. She went into reserve at Devonport, becoming tender to the gunnery school Cambridge from 1889. She took part in manoeuvres on at least eight occasions, and was not otherwise ever out of sight of land. During manoeuvres she had a separate captain, but other than that appears to have been under the overall command of the captain on the Cambridge. In March 1900 three of her crew were severely injured in an accident during gunnery practice. She was paid off in July 1902 but took part in manoeuvres again during the summer of 1903; apart from that she remained swinging at anchor at Rothesay until being sold in 1907.
