= HMS Hero =

Six Royal Navy ships have been called HMS Hero:

- HMS Hero (1759), a 74-gun third rate launched in 1759, a prison ship after 1793, renamed Rochester in 1800, and broken up 1810
- HMS Hero (1803), a 74-gun third rate launched in 1803 and wrecked on 25 December 1811, with the loss of all her crew, inside the northern Haaks about five or six miles from the Texel
- HMS Hero (1816), a 74-gun third rate launched in September 1816, renamed Wellington in December, becoming the training ship Akbar in 1862 and broken up 1908
- HMS Hero (1858), a screw-propelled 91-gun second rate, launched in 1858 and sold 1871. This was the vessel in which the Prince of Wales (later King Edward VII) sailed on his tour of Canada and the United States in 1860
- HMS Hero (1885), a Conqueror-class turret ship launched in 1885 and sunk as a target in 1908
- HMS Hero (H99), an H-class destroyer launched in 1936 and transferred to Canada as HMCS Chaudiere in 1943, broken up 1946

== See also ==
- Hero (pinnace), a steam-powered boat
- There were also at least three hired armed vessels that bore the name Hero. There were two cutters and one lugger.
- The 1970s BBC television drama series Warship was set aboard a fictional Royal Navy Leander-class frigate, HMS Hero.
