= EOC 12-inch L/27.5 43-ton gun =

EOC 12-inch L/27 43-ton gun
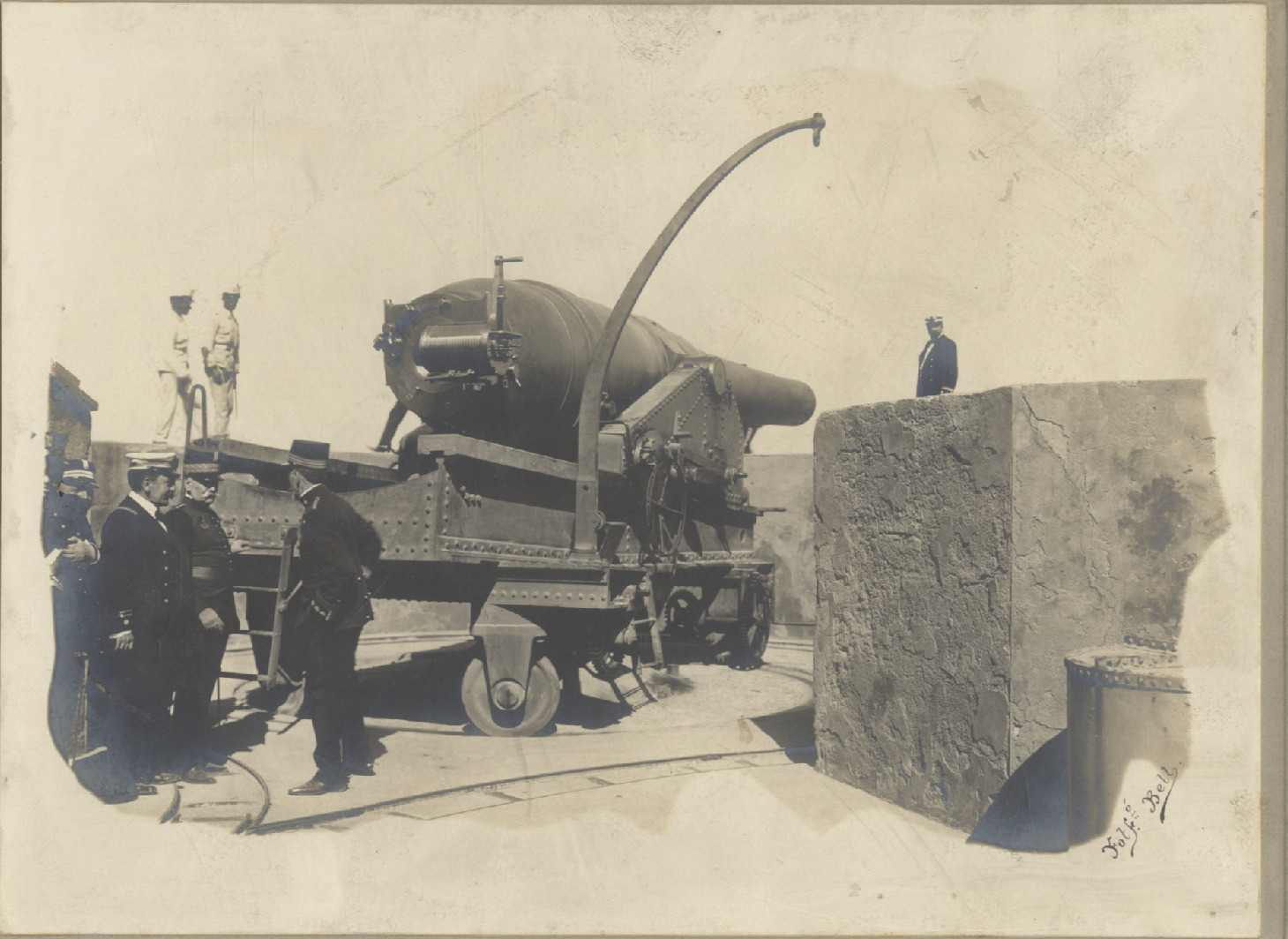
- The gun as used in Cádiz, Spain in 1908
- Type: Naval gun Coastal gun
- Place of origin: United Kingdom

Service history
- In service: 1883–?
- Used by: Spain

Production history
- Designed: 1882
- Manufacturer: Elswick Ordnance Company
- Produced: 1882-1883
- No. built: At least 2
- Variants: Unknown

Specifications
- Mass: 43 long tons (44 t)
- Length: 8,382 mm (L/27.5)
- Barrel length: 7.925 m bore (L/26)
- Calibre: 12-inch (304.8 mm)
- Muzzle velocity: 546.9 metres per second (1,790 ft/s) with service charge; 579 metres per second (1,900 ft/s) with max. charge
- Maximum firing range: 7,900 m

The EOC 12-inch L/27.5 43-ton gun was a British and Spanish rifled breech-loading naval gun of the early 1880s. The gun probably originated from the troubles that the Woolwich Arsenal faced when it attempted to create the heavy 12-inch Mk I – II breech loader. The EOC 12-inch L/27.5 was of about the same outer dimensions as the 12-inch Mk I – II and at first appeared less powerful than the Woolwich gun. However, in the end, the designers of the Elswick Ordnance Company (EOC) proved to have made the best design. EOC sold at least one gun to Spain.

== Context ==
In 1864/5 the United Kingdom reverted to using muzzle-loading guns. This did not seem problematic, but by 1878 it had become clear that muzzle-loading was a dead end. The Elswick Ordnance Company (EOC) largely owned by William Armstrong had probably reached the same conclusion somewhat earlier. In February 1877, it tested its breech loading EOC 12-inch L/23.5. In September 1878 it tested its chambered BL 6-inch 80-pounder gun. This medium gun combined breechloading and chambering and showed revolutionary results.

At the time, 'chambering' meant that the powder chamber of a gun got a bigger diameter than the barrel. Chambering allowed the use of bigger charges that nevertheless resulted in lower peak pressures inside the gun. In October 1876 the Royal Arsenal at Woolwich had tested the chambered RML 12.5-inch 38-ton gun. The Krupp 24 cm MRK L/25.5 prototype, that was first tested in December 1878, was also a chambered gun. It was about as powerful as the RML 12.5-inch 38-ton gun, but weighed only 18t.

The August 1879 tests by Krupp in Meppen showed the Krupp 24 cm MRK L/25.5 prototype and many other guns. It showed the British public that the Royal Arsenal in Woolwich made guns that were technically far behind those made by Krupp and Elswick. The arsenal had reached the same conclusion somewhat earlier. However, making guns of comparable power required a longer barrel and therefore also a switch to breechloading. The simultaneous switch to longer barrels and breechloading led to the very troubled development of the BL 12-inch Mk I – II naval gun. The development of this 12-inch 43-ton gun started in 1879 or perhaps already in 1878.

== Development ==
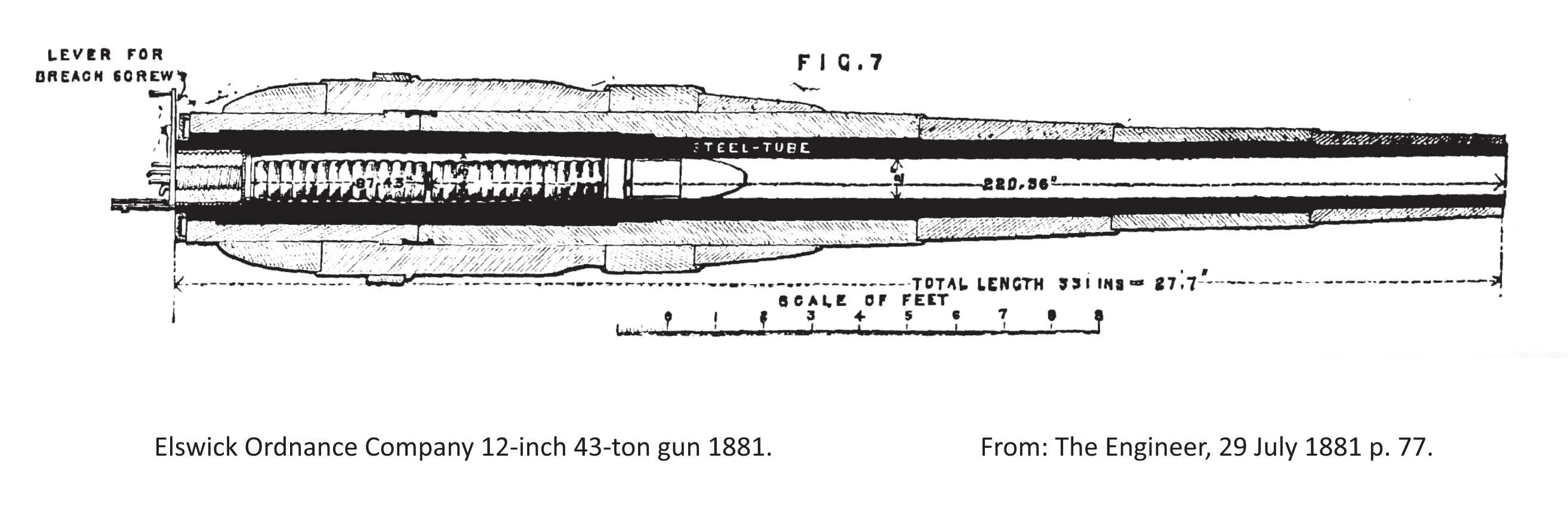
EOC 43 ton gun, 1881

After the March–April 1880 United Kingdom general election, the victorious liberals made Gladstone prime minister. A year later, George Trevelyan, Parliamentary and Financial Secretary to the Admiralty said that when the new government took power, its very first act was to organize an alternative for the Woolwich gun.

Indeed, already on 24 May 1880 the government invited Sir William Armstrong of the Elswick Ordnance Company (EOC) to send a 43-ton breechloader to Woolwich for experiment. Armstrong accepted, but asked for ten months to produce it. Manufacture lasted from June 1880 to August 1881.

This one 12-inch gun was not the only one that the Elswick Ordnance Company manufactured. In October 1881, the American colonel S. Crispin visited the EOC. He saw that two 43-ton breech-loading guns of the ordinary Armstrong type (steel tube with coiled jackets) were in progress.

When HMS Conqueror was launched in September 1881, Trevelyan's story about how the EOC gun got ordered was repeated. It was also stated that two of these guns would be used to arm Conqueror. It seems doubtful that the guns of Conqueror were made by EOC.

=== An EOC 43 ton gun for Spain ===
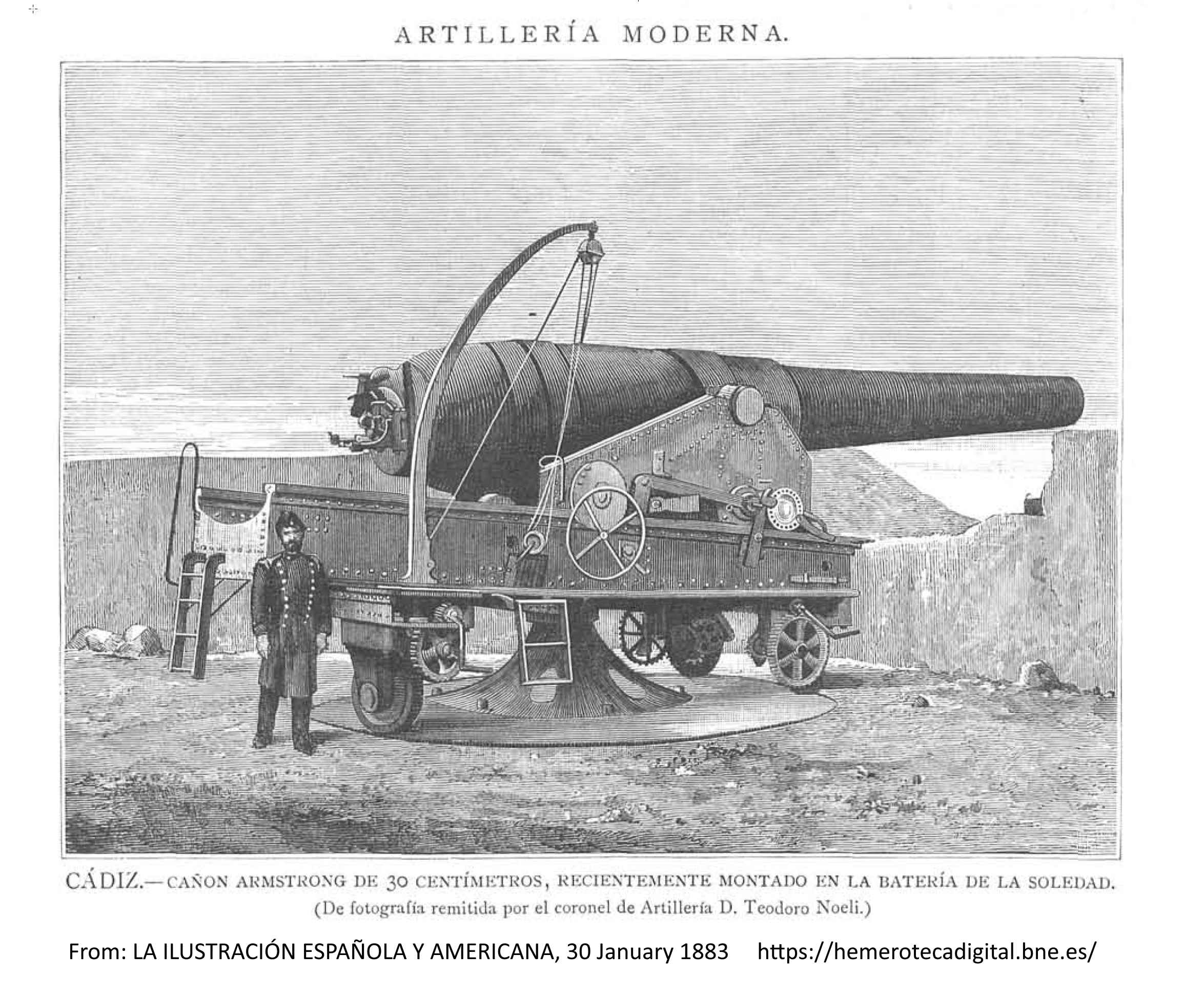
The Cadiz gun in 1882/3

In June 1880, the EOC and the Spanish government signed a contract for a 10-inch and a 12-inch gun. Both were to be delivered in 7 months. The price for both guns was 418,000 pesetas or 175,600 Austrian florins. The 25.4 cm gun arrived in October 1881. However, in June 1882, the 12-inch gun had not yet been delivered.

During a December 1884 test of the gun in Cadiz, its manufacture was said to have been started in 1882. This remark implies that the Spanish gun was made after the two guns that were in progress in 1881 were made.

== Characteristics ==
=== Technical ===
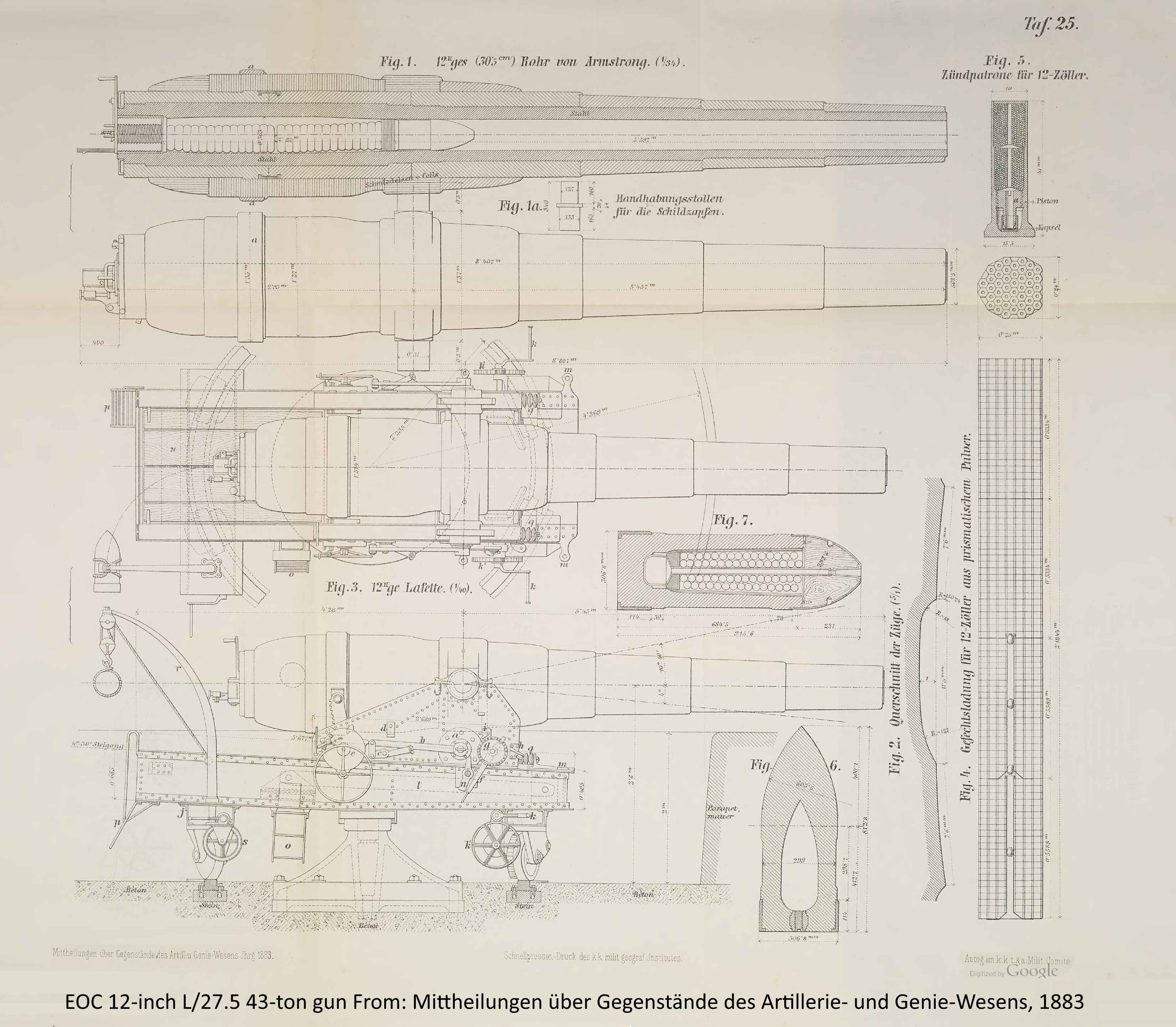
EOC 12-inch L/27.5 43-ton gun in Cadiz 1883

The 12-inch 43-ton as described early on, was 331 inches (8.407 m) long (L/27.5). The length of bore was 312.2 inches (7.930 m) (L/26). Caliber was 12 inches (0.3048 m). The rifling consisted of 50 grooves. The progressive twist rate of the Spanish gun was L/45.

It is not immediately clear whether the gun that was actually used by Spain significantly differed from the two guns that were being manufactured in 1881. Shortly before a January 1883 test, its data were given as: total length 8.25 m; length of bore 7.92 m; weight 44,000 kg; weight of the projectile 317.5 kg; maximum charge 158.55 kg; service charge 149.5 kg; velocity with the maximum charge 595 m/s.

It's quite obvious how the deviating weight of the Spanish gun came about: It originated from rounding: 43 long ton equals 43.7t (metric) tonne, which can then be rounded off to 44,000 kg. The total length of 8.25 m also seems to originate from such a rounding. Just like other nations, the Spanish also like to round to whole centimeters. This way, the 30.48 cm gun became a 30 cm gun. Other sources had total length of 8,382 mm, length of bore 7,925 mm and a weight of 43,688 kg. When the gun was finally delivered to Cadiz in 1883, it weighed 44,350 kg.

The Spanish gun was described as consisting of a forged cast steel inner tube surrounded by two layers of coils. The first layer consisted of six parts that reached up to the muzzle. The second layer consisted of four coils, including the one that had the special trunnions.

The powder chamber of the first version of the gun was 86.25 inches (2.191 m) long with a diameter of 14.3 inches (0.3632 m), giving a capacity of 13,178 in^{3}. This was significantly longer, and narrower, but also more spacious than that of the competing Woolwich gun.

=== Performance ===
With a service charge of 330 pounds (149.7 kg), the early version of the gun fired a 700 pounds (317.5 kg) projectile with a velocity of 1,835 feet per second (559 m/s). Pressure inside the gun was then 17.1 tons per square inch (2,606 atm). The Woolwich gun reached a comparable result with a service charge of only 286 pounds (129.7 kg). This propelled a 720 pounds (326.6 kg) projectile to 1,855 feet per second (565 m/s) with an (estimated) identical pressure.

This comparison made the American colonel Crispin conclude that the Elswick gun was less effective than the Woolwich gun. However, another observer noted that the Armstrong design would suffer less longitudinal strain at the same pressures. A drawing of the gun showed that the EOC gun's tube was coiled till the muzzle.

The contract for the Spanish gun stipulated that it would first be tested in England. There, the gun had to fire three 317.5 kg shot with a charge of 320 pounds (145.1 kg) and attain an average velocity of 1,950 feet per second (594 m/s). Meanwhile, peak pressures should not become higher than 20 Lt per inch^{2} or 2,722 atm. In this test, the gun attained a velocity of only 1,889 feet per second (576 m/s) even though the charge was increased to 350 pounds (158.8 kg). A test in Woolwich with another 43-ton gun made for the Spanish government led to similar results.

In late January 1883, a second test of the Spanish 43-ton gun took place in Cadiz. It was attended by a special commission and by Major Jones, who was a representative of the EOC. Apart from the general handling of the gun, it was to test:

- The velocity of the regular grenade fired with the regular charge gewöhnliche Ladung
- The velocity of the chilled cast iron with the service charge Gefechtsladung
- The maximum velocity that could be attained without exceeding a peak pressure of 20 ton per inch^{2} or 3,149 kg/cm^{2}

On 29 January, three regular grenades were fired with a charge of 113.4 kg of pebble powder. These attained an average velocity of 470.9 metres per second (1,540 ft/s) at a pressure of 2,190.4 kg/cm^{2}. On 30 January 6 chilled cast iron grenades were fired with the service charge of 147.4 kg prismatic powder. Average velocity was 546.9 metres per second (1,790 ft/s) at a pressure of 2,318.3 kg/cm^{2}. On 6 February 5 shot were fired with increasing charges. The highest velocity at which maximum peak pressure was not exceeded was 580.3 metres per second (1,900 ft/s) with a charge of 165.6 kg. It meant that with 579 metres per second (1,900 ft/s) the gun did not achieve the required minimum velocity of 594 metres per second (1,950 ft/s) at less than 20 ton per inch^{2} pressure. This resulted in an about 4% lower price. With the service charge, the maximum range was 7,900 m.

In December 1884, the 12-inch breechloading guns was again tested In Cadiz. The gun was fired at an armored target. During the test, charges were lowered to represent firing at a longer distances.

== Bibliography ==
- "Artillería Moderna". La Ilustración española y americana. No. IV. 30 January 1883. pp. 7, 16.
- Crispin, S. (1883). "Appendix 19: Report on European Ordnance and manufactures (30 plates)". House documents. Government Printing Office, Washington. p. 211–.
- "The Elswick Ordnance and Engine Works No. III". The Engineer. LII: 73, 77. 1881.
- "Several articles". The Engineer. XLIII. The Engineer, London: 134, 203. 1877.
- "The recent gunnery experiments at Meppen". Engineering. Engineering, Bedford Street, London. 1879. pp. 134–135.
- "Supply - Navy Estimates". Hansard's Parliamentary Debates. Vol. 265. Cornelius Buck, London. 1881. pp. 36–98.
- Holzner (1882). "Neue Hinterladkanonen von Armstrong". Mitteilungen über Gegenstände des Artillerie- und Geniewesens. K.K. Technischen & administrativen Militär-Comité: 207–218.
- Holzner (1883). "Armstrong's 12zöll. Hinterladkanone". Mitteilungen über Gegenstände des Artillerie- und Geniewesens. K.K. Technischen & administrativen Militär-Comité: 421–428.
- Inglis, T. (1878). "Targets for the Trial of Recent Battering Ordnance part IV". Professional Papers of the Corps of Royal Engineers. II. The Royal Engineer Institute: 185–202.
- Inglis, T. (1880). "Targets for the Trial of Recent Battering Ordnance". Professional Papers of the Corps of Royal Engineers. IV. The Royal Engineer Institute: 169–194.
- Jones, C. (1885). "Ten and Twelve-inch Armstrong Guns at Cadiz (Excerpt)". The Engineer. 59–60: 247.
- "Her Majesty's ship Conqueror". The Marine Engineer. Whitehall Technical Press: 147–148. 1 October 1880.
- "Resumé des Travaux du Comité Supérieur Consultatif de L'Artillerie Espagnole en 1880-1881 (Extrait du Memorial de Artilleria)". Revue d'artillerie. XXI (6). Berger-Levrault: 537–562. 1883.
- War Office (1886). Treatise on the Manufacture of Guns and Text-book of Service Ordnance. Her Majesty's Stationery Office. p. 240.
