= BL 12-inch Mk III – VII naval gun =

Ordnance BL 12 inch gun Mk III – VIIte
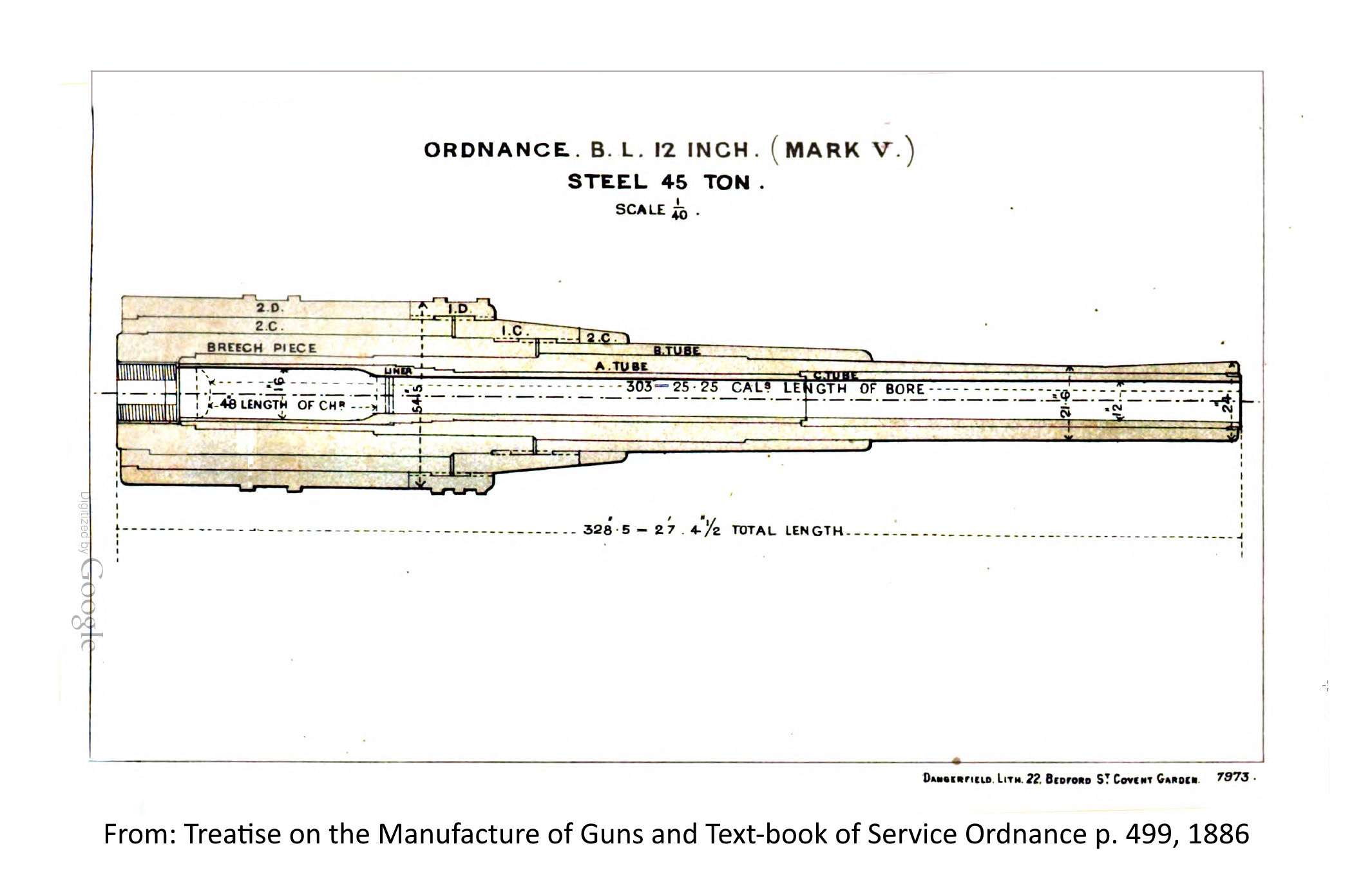
- Ordnance B.L. 12 inch (Mark V)
- Type: Naval gun Coastal gun
- Place of origin: United Kingdom

Service history
- In service: 1886?–1920
- Used by: Royal Navy

Production history
- Designed: 1882
- Variants: Mks III - VII

Specifications
- Mass: Mk III 44 tons; Mk IV 45 tons; MK V 45 tons; Mk VI, VII : 46 tons
- Length: 27 feet 4.5 inches (8.344 m) (L/27)
- Barrel length: Mk III - VII 303 inches (7.696 m) bore (L/25.25)
- Calibre: 12-inch (304.8 mm)
- Muzzle velocity: 1,910 feet per second (582 m/s) 714 lb projectile, with 295 lb Brown Prismatic powder; 1,914 feet per second (583 m/s) with 295 lb brown powder or 88 lb 8 oz cordite size 30 charge.
- Effective firing range: MK III / IV: 8,000 yards (7,300 m) at 9° 57'

The BL 12 inch naval gun Mk III–VII were a series of all-steel British rifled breech-loading naval gun models of the mid-1880s intended for the largest warships such as battleships and also for coastal defence.

== Development ==
In about 1879, the British government finally decided to return to breechloading guns. For the 12-inch (305 mm) caliber, this led to the BL 12-inch Mk I – II naval gun of 43 (later 47) tons designed by the Royal Arsenal in early 1882. While this gun did have some steel coils, it still relied heavily on wrought iron parts.

The Elswick Ordnance Company of William Armstrong & Co. then took the unusual step of making several objections to the design of this gun, that it was to manufacture by contract.

In April 1881, the Ordnance Committee had been appointed. It was especially tasked with managing the production of the new breechloading guns. Armstrong's objections induced the committee to conduct a thorough investigation and to call upon experts such as: Colonel Eardley Maitland, William Armstrong, Captain Noble, Mr. Vavasseur, Dr. Siemens, and many others.

The report of the Ordnance Committee about the material of the guns said that wrought iron should no longer be used in guns, and that coiled steel (though superior to iron) should be replaced by cast steel forged into hoops. In 1883 this was followed by a recommendation to fix the breech screw into the breech piece instead of fixing it to the inner tube. This would lower longitudinal stress. Another measure was to fix the elements together in the direction of the length of the gun.

== Mark III (44 ton) ==
=== Development ===
In August 1882, the British authorities concluded that heavy artillery like the 12-inch gun should be made of steel only. It led them to halt the construction of new 12-inch Mark I/II guns. In order to provide the navy with the guns it urgently required, it then re-allocated six Mark I/II guns then under construction for Land Service (L.S.), to use on board ships (Sea Service).

Of course, the army land service then had to order new guns. The order obviously went to the Elswick Ordnance Company (EOC). In March 1884 the Secretary of State for War, the Marquess of Hartington declared that there were then under construction three 43-ton guns for the navy and ten for the army.

In May 1886, one of the BL 12-inch Mk II guns on board HMS Collingwood burst. This made it very urgent to replace the 12-inch Mark II gun, especially on turret ships. The Marquess of Ripon, First Lord of the Admiralty then found out that the War Office had six improved and almost finished 43-ton guns under construction for the land service. He asked to have these and after a necessary change to the trunnions, he was expected to get them in 3-4 months.

These six land service guns would become the Mark III gun. In conjunction with the accident on Collingwood, Mark III was said to be meant for Land Service (L.S.), while Mark IV was meant for Sea Service, and Mark V was meant for No Man's Fort (L.S.). In August 1886, George Hamilton, First Lord of the Admiralty stated that he expected that by mid-October 1886, six guns of a new type originally constructed for land service, would be mounted in the Conqueror and Colossus. In June 1887 the guns were said to have been on board of these two ships for a while and to be Mark III.

=== Characteristics ===
The Mk III gun was designed by the Elswick Ordnance Company as a modification of the Royal Arsenal (Woolwich) designs. It was trunnionless and made entirely of steel. It was connected to its carriage by way of three 'thrust-collars' which were formed on the exterior halfway round on the lower side of the gun beneath the center of gravity. These sat in grooves into the carriage and transferred both recoil and twisting strain. The breech block was manipulated by hydraulic arrangements.

Internally, the steel inner tube ended on a level with the face of the screw. A breech piece was shrunk over the tube and took the breech screw. The gun had a larger number of hoops of forged steel than the Mark I, but of the same thickness of metal. The hoops extended to the muzzle and had suitable shoulders to prevent any movement of the parts of the gun. Internal dimensions and ballistic powers were the same as those of Marks IV and V.

Total length of the gun was 27 feet 4.5 inches (8.344 m) (L/27). The length of bore was 303 inches (7.696 m) (L/25). The rifling consisted of 48 grooves of 0.5 inch depth. The twist rate was progressive, increasing from L/120 to L/35 on the first 125 inches of the barrel. It then remained at L/35, meaning that the projectile turned on its axis every 35 calibers of its trajectory.

The chamber of the Mk III had a diameter of 16 inches (40.64 cm) and a length of 48 inches (121.9 cm), giving it a capacity of 9,666 inch^{3}.

== Mark IV (45 ton) ==
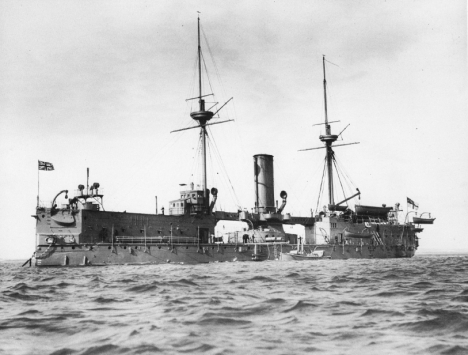
HMS Edinburgh (1882)

Mark IV was trunnionless, just like Mark III. It was an all steel design by the Royal Arsenal, meant only to arm HMS Edinburgh (1882).

Internally, the Mk IV consisted of an inner tube over which the breech piece was shrunk. The breech piece took the breech screw. From the breech piece, six steel hoops followed towards the muzzle. There were two layers of two and three hoops each over the breech piece. The thrust collar ring was attached to both the breech piece and the 1 B hoop. Two hoops in front of the thrust collar ring completed the design. The construction numbered 16 pieces in total.

The internal dimensions of the Mk IV were the same as those of Mk III.

== Mark V (45 ton) ==
Mark V was intended to supersede Mark IV. It was also a trunnionless gun meant for Sea Service. In 1886, Brassey said the gun was then under consideration and was meant for No Man's Land Fort. Two of these were made for HMS Hero (1885), sister of HMS Conqueror (1881) that had been equipped with the disappointing Mark I.

The internal dimensions of Mk V were the same as those of Mk IV, and the outline was practically the same. The construction differed because of a liner and α-tube in the A-tube. It was therefore not hooped up to the muzzle. The short hoops over the breech were replaced by a hoops in one length. In 1886, Brassey dubbed the construction of Mk V as having the chase made of a double tube.

The Mark V gun was also made by Whitworth. The Whitworth version might have weighed 46-ton.

== Mark VI (46 ton) ==
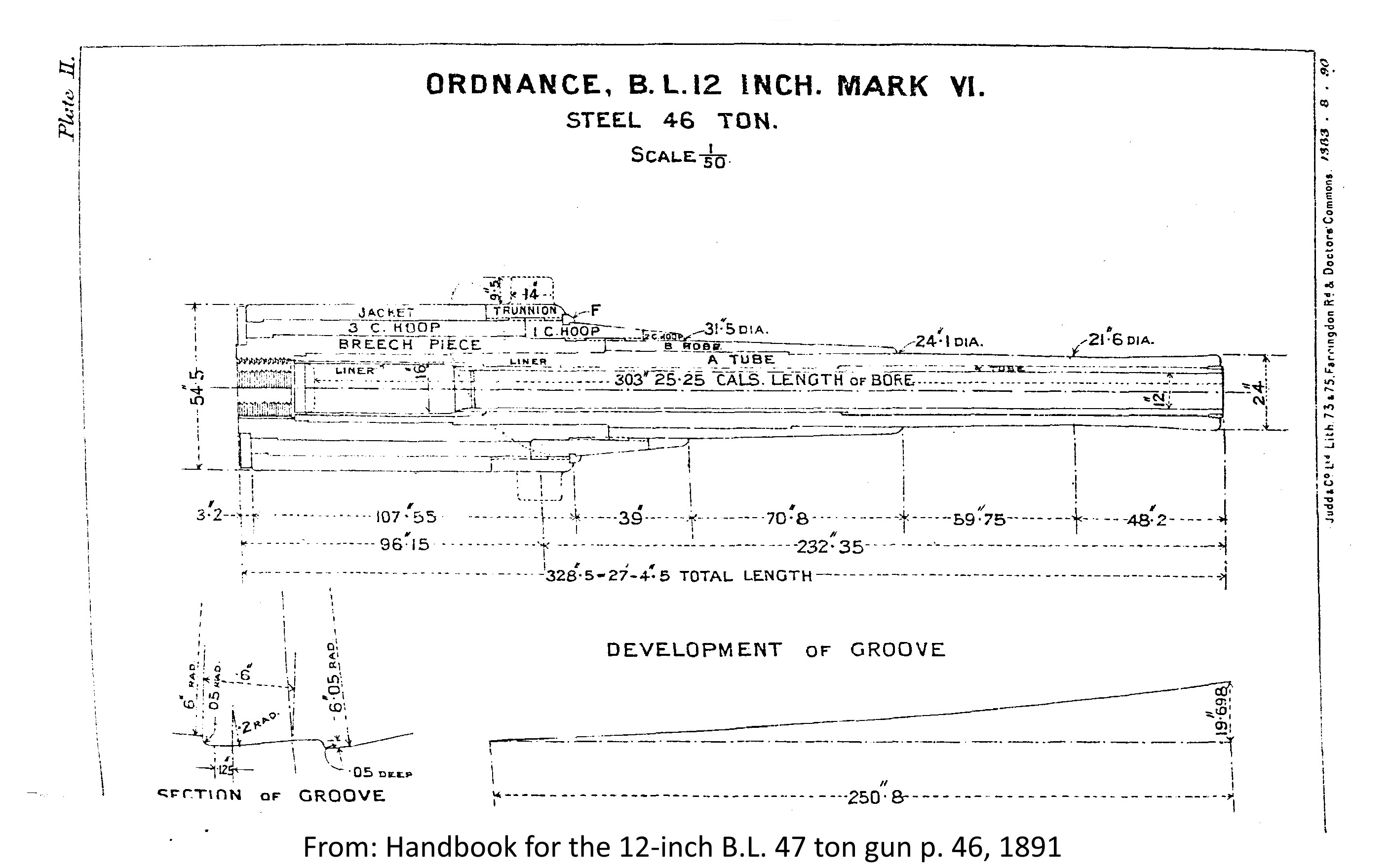
BL 12 Inch Mark VI 46 ton

The Mark VI had an α-tube inside the A-tube for about one-third of the length of the barrel. Towards the breech, this was replaced by a liner. Over the A-tube were the breech piece and a long B-hoop. The 1 C hoop was over both and interlocked with them. The 2 C hoop was in front of it and the 3 C hoop was over the breech piece. The trunnion was shrunk over parts of the 1 C and 3 C hoops. An F ring kept the trunnions in place to the front. A jacket was shrunk over the rear of the 3 C hoop keeping the trunnions in place to the rear. The image shows how all these parts kept each other in place, and how similar the construction was to the Mk V.

The total length of the Mk. VI was 27 feet 4.5 inches (8.344 m) (L/27), i.e. equal to the previous models. At 303 inches (7.696 m) (L/25), the length of bore was also equal to the previous models, see the image.

== Mark VII (46 ton) ==
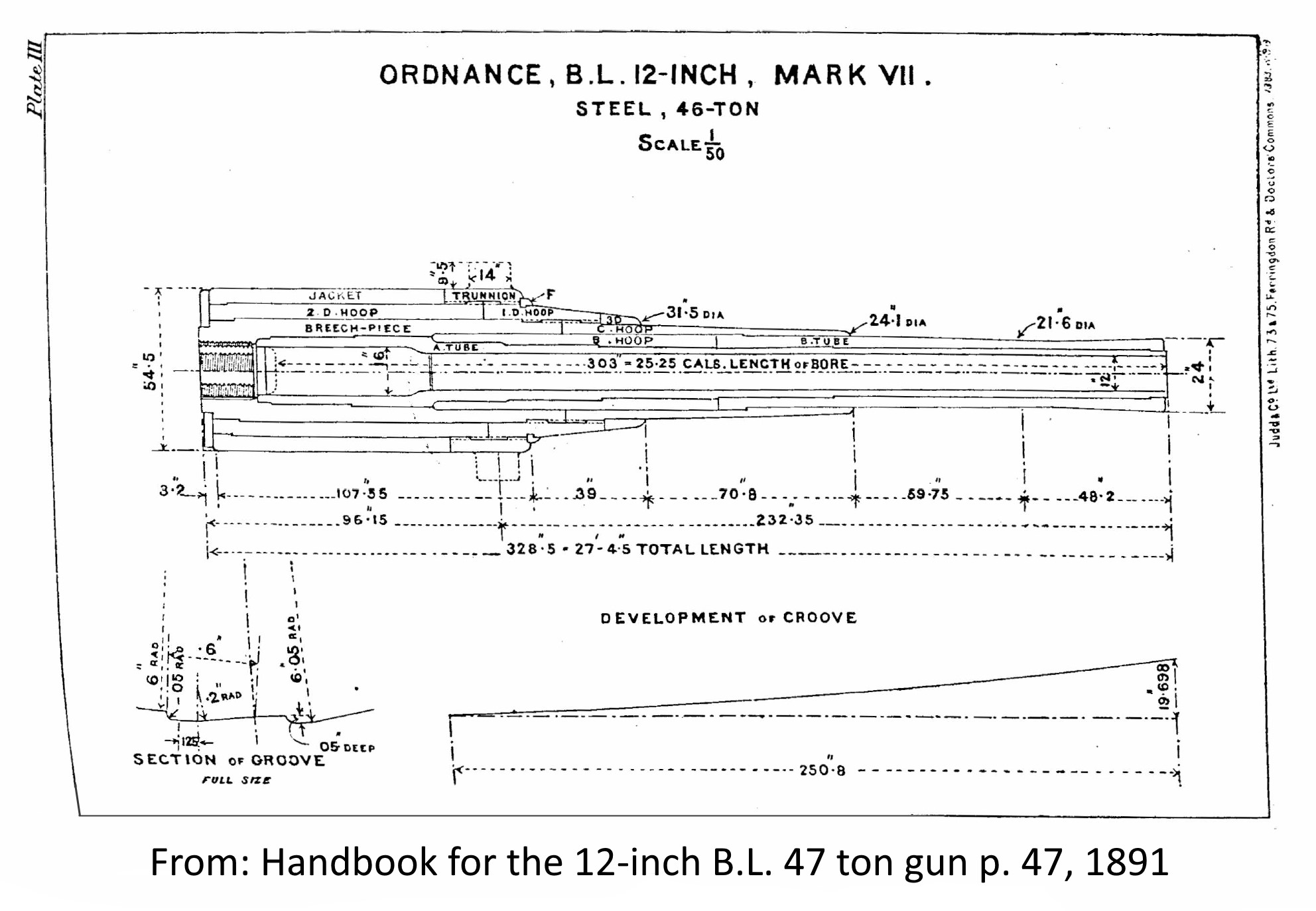
BL 12 Inch Mark VII 46 ton

The Mk VII gun was really different from the previous designs. It had neither an α-tube nor a liner, but did have an A tube and a B tube over the chase. It's not immediately clear whether this was a real difference or a matter or terminology.

The total length of the Mk. VII was 27 feet 4.5 inches (8.344 m) (L/27), i.e. equal to the previous models. At 303 inches (7.696 m) (L/25), the length of bore was also equal to the previous models, see the image.

== Use ==
Mark III was used on board HMS Conqueror and HMS Colossus.

Mark IV was used on board HMS Edinburgh, sister to HMS Colossus.

Mark V was used on board HMS Hero. Mark V was also used to replace the Mark II guns on HMS Collingwood.

== Bibliography ==
- Brassey, Thomas (1886). Brassey's Naval Annual. J. Griffin and Co. Portsmouth.
- "Miscellanea". Engineering. 45: 591. 1888.
- Handbook for the 12-inch B.L. 47 ton gun Mark I, VI, VII. Her Majesty's Stationery Office. 1891.
- "Supply - Army Estimates". Hansard's Parliamentary Debates. Vol. 286. Cornelius Buck, London. 1884.
- "Navy - H.M.S. Colossus - The 43-ton Guns". Hansard's Parliamentary Debates. Vol. 306. Cornelius Buck, London. 1886.
- "Ordnance Department". Hansard's Parliamentary Debates. Vol. 308. Cornelius Buck, London. 1886.
- "Navy ... the 45-ton gun". Hansard's Parliamentary Debates. Vol. 316. Cornelius Buck, London. 1887.
- Mackinlay, George (1887). Text Book of Gunnery. Her Majesty's Stationery Office.
- Ordnance College (1902). Text Book of Gunnery. Her Majesty's Stationery Office.
- War Office (1886). Treatise on the Manufacture of Guns and Text-book of Service Ordnance. Her Majesty's Stationery Office. p. 240.
