= Conqueror-class ironclad =

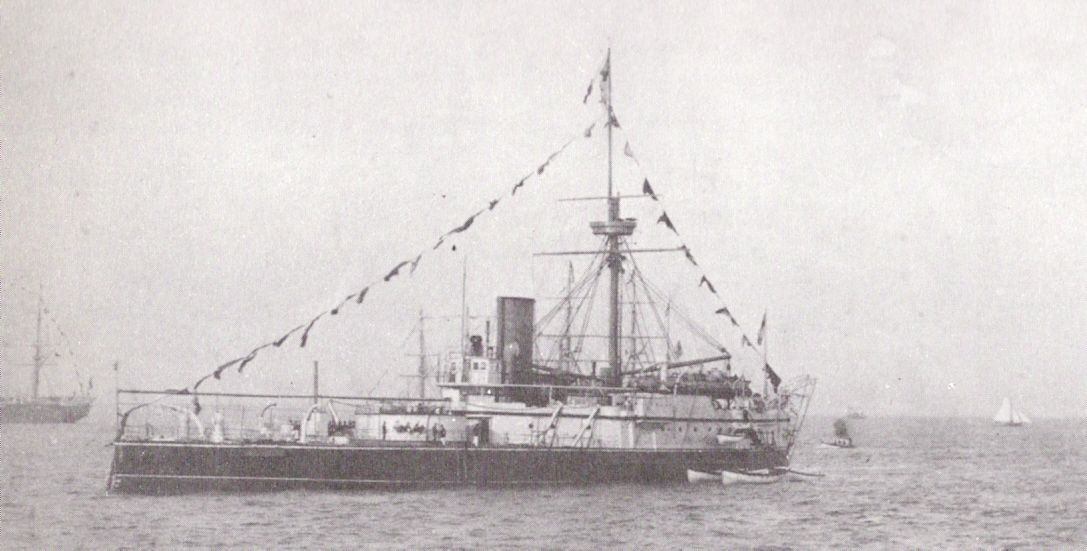
- HMS Conqueror circa. 1886

Class overview
- Builders: Chatham Dockyard
- Built: 1879–1886
- In commission: 1887–1908
- Completed: 2

General characteristics
- Displacement: Conqueror: 6,200 tons; Hero: 6,440 tons
- Length: 270 ft (82.3 m) p/p; 288 ft (87.8 m) o/a
- Beam: 58 ft (18 m)
- Draught: 23 ft 6 in (7.16 m)
- Installed power: 4,500 ihp (3,400 kW)
- Propulsion: 2-shaft inverted compound engines
- Speed: 14 knots (26 km/h)
- Complement: 330 men
- Armament: Armoured ram; 2 BL 12-inch (304.8 mm) guns; 4 × 6-inch (152.4 mm) Mk II breech-loading guns; 7 × 6-pounder (57 mm) quick fire guns; 5 × 3-pounder (47 mm) quick fire guns; 6 × 14 in torpedo tubes
- Armour: Belt: 12 inches tapering to 8 inches; Citadel: 12 inches to 10.5 inches; Turret: 14 inches face, 12 inches sides; Conning tower: 12 inches to 6 inches; Bulkhead: 11 inches; Deck: 2.5 inches to 1.25 inches (32 mm)

The Conqueror class battleships were ironclad warships which served in the Victorian Royal Navy, and whose main weapon was designed to be the ram.

== Description ==
The class consisted of two ships, Conqueror and Hero. At the time of their inception and design, it appeared to naval architects that armour plate could be made resistant enough to protect the essential areas of warships from incoming artillery fire, and that therefore an alternative method of offence was needed in order to achieve a decisive outcome in any future naval combat. The answer appeared to be to use the whole ship as a projectile with which to ram an enemy.

These ships were of only moderate size, intended to be adequately fast and manoeuvrable enough to be able to catch and strike a fleeing or manoeuvering enemy. They carried a single turret with two large guns, which were intended to engage on either beam an enemy who had evaded a ramming attack. Firing over the bow was expected to cause unacceptable structural damage from blast.

The ships were not seen as successful, as they were too small for efficient service as ocean-going vessels, and too large to function close inshore as coast- or harbour-defence ships. They had approximately nine feet of freeboard forward, and could not make more than ten knots in rough weather. They also rolled excessively. Neither ship ever saw any front-line deployment, spending their entire lives as gunnery tenders or in reserve.

== Bibliography ==
- Brown, David K. (1997). Warrior to Dreadnought: Warship Development 1860–1905. Chatham Publishing. ISBN 1-86176-022-1.
- Beeler, John (2001). Birth of the Battleship: British Capital Ship Design 1870-1881. Naval Institute Press. ISBN 1-55750-213-7.
- Friedman, Norman (2018). British Battleships of the Victorian Era. Naval Institute Press. ISBN 978-1-68247-329-0.
- Parkes, Oscar (1990) [1966]. British Battleships, Warrior 1860 to Vanguard 1950: A History of Design, Construction, and Armament (New & rev. ed.). Naval Institute Press. ISBN 1-55750-075-4.
- Roberts, John (1979). "Great Britain (including Empire Forces)". In Chesneau, Roger & Kolesnik, Eugene M. (eds.). Conway's All the World's Fighting Ships 1860–1905. Mayflower Books. pp. 1–113. ISBN 0-8317-0302-4.
