= BL 12-inch Mk I – II naval gun =

Ordnance BL 12 inch gun Mk I - IIte
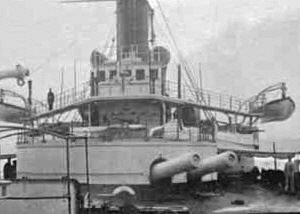
- On HMS Conqueror
- Type: Naval gun Coastal gun
- Place of origin: United Kingdom

Service history
- In service: 1882–1920
- Used by: Royal Navy

Production history
- Designed: 1882
- No. built: Mark I: 3; Mark II: 11
- Variants: Mks I - II (Note: Mk I = Mark 1, Mk II = Mark 2. Britain used Roman numerals to designate marks (i.e. models) of ordnance until after World War II. Hence this article describes the first two models of British BL 12-inch guns)

Specifications
- Mass: Including breech: As built: 43 tons; Chase hooped: 47 tons
- Length: 328.5 inches (8.344 m) (27.5 calibres)
- Barrel length: 301.7 inches (7.663 m) bore (25.1 calibres)
- Shell: 714 pounds (324 kg)
- Calibre: 12-inch (304.8 mm)
- Muzzle velocity: 1,910 feet per second (582 m/s) 714 lb projectile, with 295 lb Brown Prismatic powder; 1,914 feet per second (583 m/s) with 295 lb brown powder or 88 lb 8 oz cordite size 30 charge.
- Effective firing range: 8,000 yards (7,300 m) at 9° 57'

The BL 12 inch naval gun Mk I was a British rifled breech-loading naval gun of the early 1880s intended for the largest warships such as battleships and also coastal defence. It was Britain's first attempt to match the large guns being installed in rival European navies, particularly France, after Britain transitioned from rifled muzzle-loading guns to the modern rifled breech-loaders somewhat later than the European powers.

Mks I and II were part steel, part iron. Their barrels were 328.5 inches (8.344 m) (L/27.5) long and the guns used the same charge as the later all-steel models up to Mark VII. Officially, they even had the same ballistic capabilities. However, after some accidents, they were no longer trusted and were withdrawn from sea service.

== Development ==
=== Context ===
After the British government returned to using muzzle-loading guns in 1864/5, it was quite content with its muzzleloaders made by the Royal Arsenal at Woolwich. In the mid 1870s the arsenal was probably ahead in 'chambering' guns. A chambered gun had a chamber with a higher diameter than that of its barrel. This allowed a higher charge, but necessitated a longer barrel to 'consume' that charge. The long guns that Krupp tested in Meppen in 1878 and 1879 then proved that muzzle loading had become a dead end.

At the time, the United Kingdom was not without experience in manufacturing breechloaders. In February 1877, the Elswick Ordnance Company had tested its breechloading EOC 12-inch L/23.5. In mid 1878 it had tested its chambered BL 6-inch 80-pounder gun. In December 1878, the EOC's chambered 8-inch breechloader was tested in Woolwich. When EOC became aware of Krupp's 24 cm MRK L/25.5, tested in Meppen in 1879, it started to develop a 9-inch gun of 18 tons. Meanwhile Vavasseur of the smaller London Ordnance Works was busy manufacturing all steel breechloaders.

=== The Woolwich experimental 43 ton gun ===
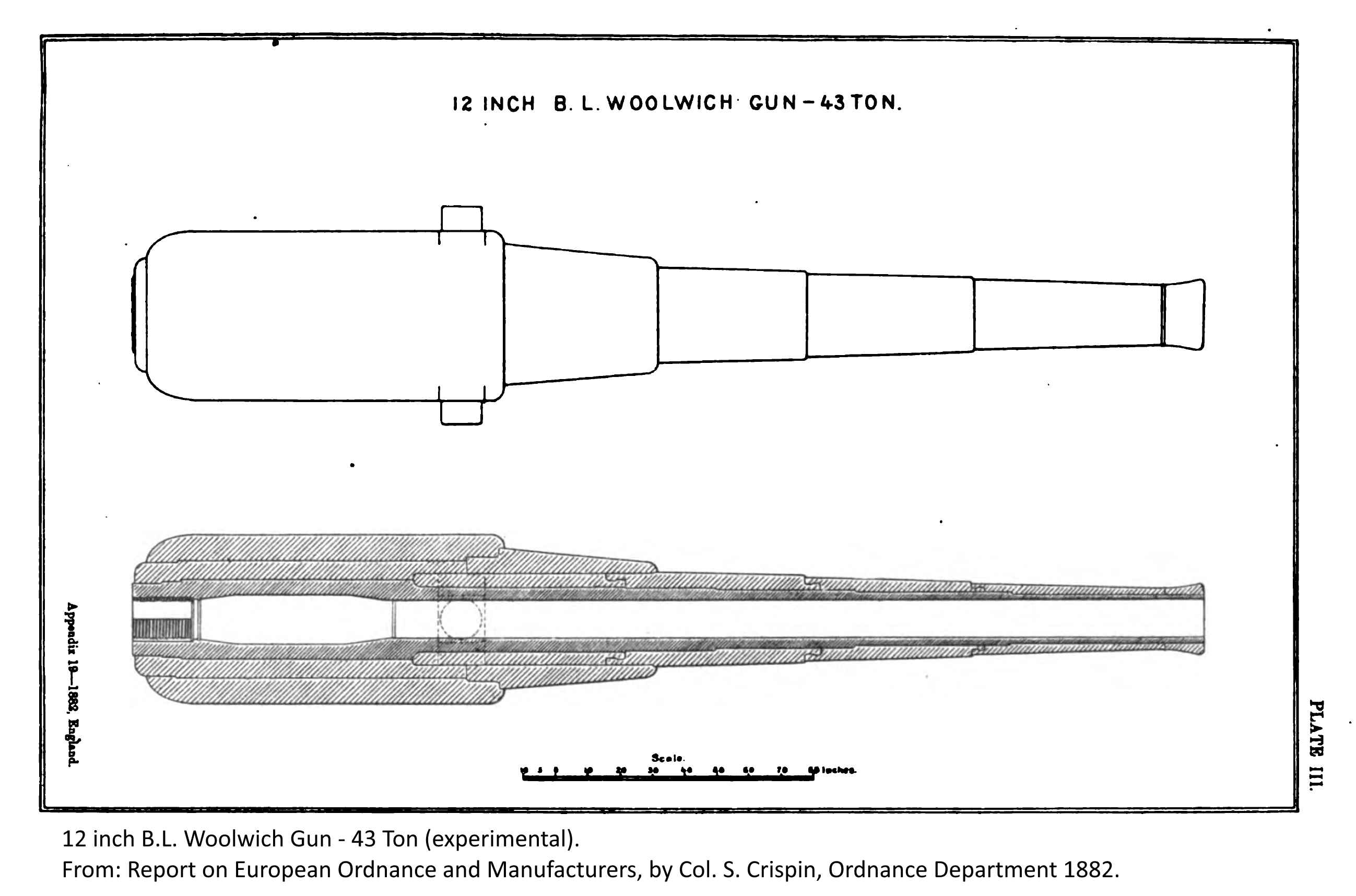
Woolwich experimental gun

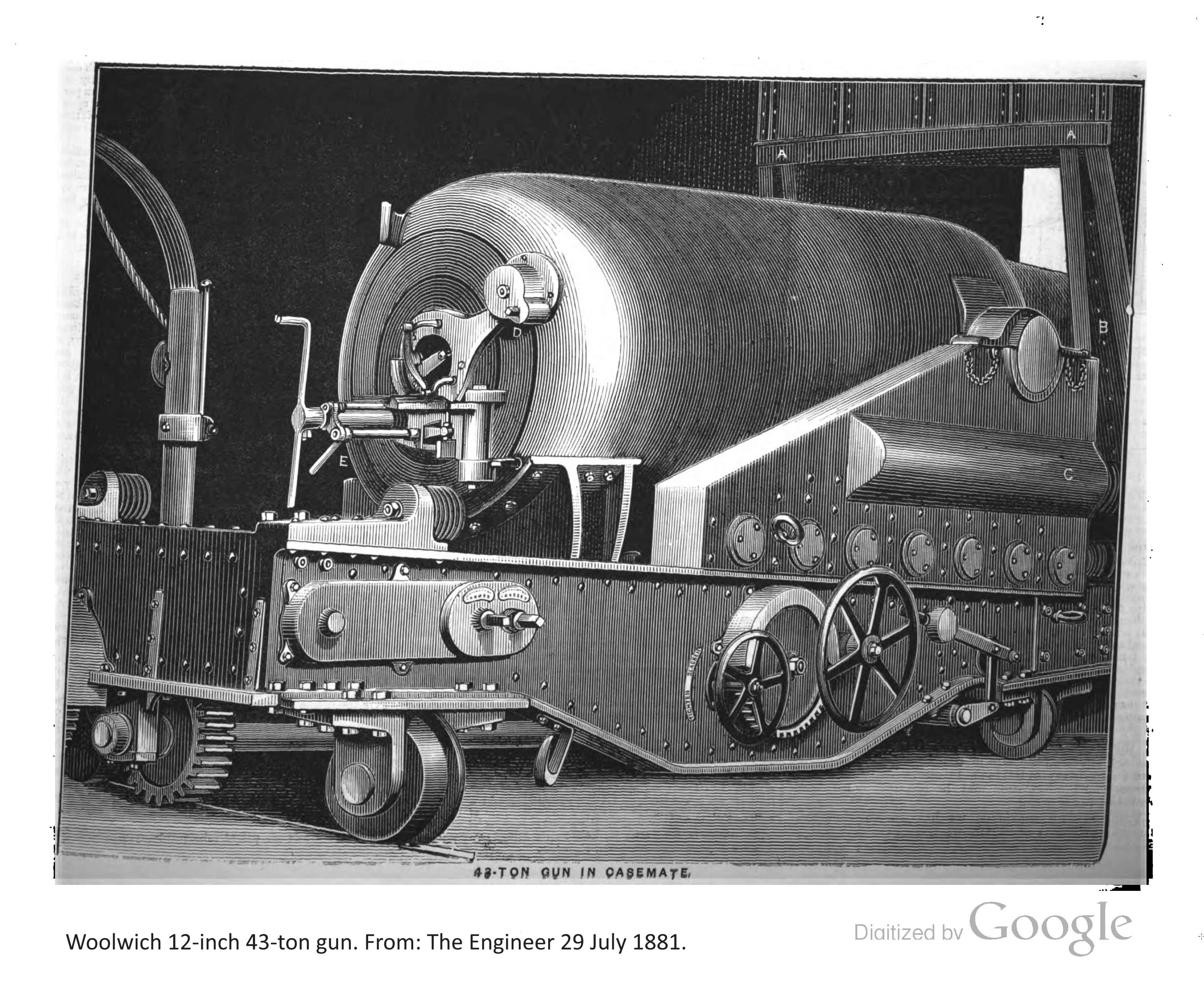
Woolwich 12-inch 43-ton gun 1881 on yoke carriage

In June 1879, the British government set up a Committee on Ordnance under Maj-general S.E. Gordon. It was to finally decide the muzzleloading vs. breechloading matter. It quickly decided in favor of breechloading and had Charles Younghusband, superintendent of the R.G.F. furnish a design for a 12-inch 43 ton gun. Somewhat smaller calibers followed later. It meant that the arsenal did not follow the usual practice of first testing new developments (breechloading, longer barrels) with smaller calibers. The urgency to switch to breechloading for the Royal Navy's battleships might explain this. By July 1880, a 12-inch rifled breech-loading gun of 43 ton was in advanced state of construction.

Later in 1880, a 43 ton gun was mentioned as being prepared at Woolwich for trial. It was 358 inches (9.1 m) long and meant to use a charge of 285 pounds (129 kg) of P2 powder to fire a projectile of 714 pounds (324 kg). Other guns being prepared were a 10.4-inch 26 ton gun and a 9.2-inch 18 ton gun. By then EOC had received an order for 18 BL 6-inch 80-pounder gun and one 43 ton breechloader. In December 1880, the 43 ton gun fired two shots at the proof butts with charges of 200 pounds (91 kg) and 250 pounds (110 kg). In March 1881, the Committee on Ordnance was dissolved. By then a single 43 ton gun had been completed and proved. In April 1881, a new Ordnance Committee was appointed.

On 20 July 1881, the 43-ton gun fired three shot at a range of 500 yards. The goal of the test was to see how the gun behaved on its carriage. This carriage was an innovative yoke design by Colonel Inglis. The yoke frame was a powerful rectangular girder frame fixed in structure around the port through which the gun fired. The yoke was bent horizontally so that it could move on rollers with vertical axes in grooves in the roof and floor of the casemate. This was consistent with how the lower carriage was fixed on a forward point and moved/pivoted sideways on its rollers. The upper carriage was connected to the yoke by two brakes, i.e. cylindrical water buffers. If the gun was fired, the recoil moved the upper carriage backwards, but this was braked by the cylinders, which limited the recoil movement to only 4 feet.

The primary difference between the EOC 43-ton gun (below) and the Woolwich experimental gun, was in the powder chamber. That of the experimental Woolwich gun was shorter and wider, but also smaller. A comparison between the two guns seemed to favor the Woolwich design. However, the same difference in the powder chamber was also noted by another observer. He wrote that: Consequently, the longitudinal strain on the Woolwich gun is much greater for the same pressure, it is obvious however, that that breech is specially strong. In mid 1881, another statement about the gun: This gun has no longitudinal strength forward from the trunnions excepting from its hacked-about steel tube, and therefore should never be placed in a turret but en barbette ,,, for burst it must sooner or later...

The powder chamber of the Woolwich experimental gun was 58.35 inches (148.2 cm) long with a diameter of 15.5 inches (39 cm) and a total capacity of 10,120 in^{3}.

=== The EOC experimental 43 ton gun ===
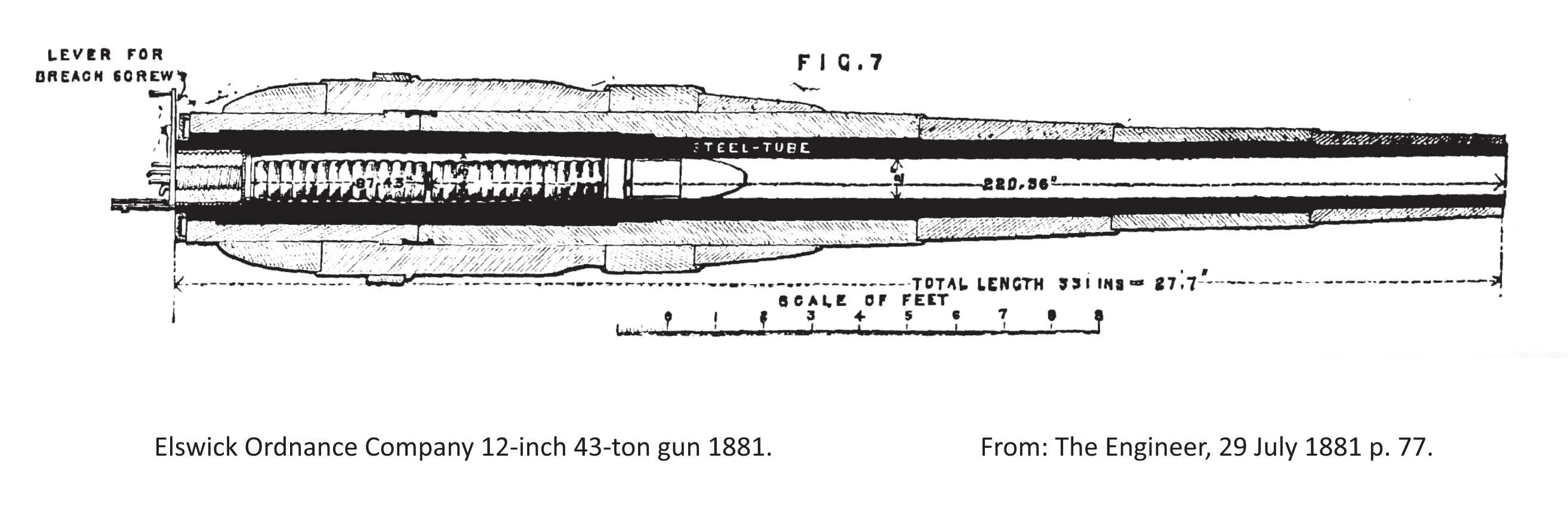
EOC 43 ton gun, 1881

On 24 May 1880, the government ordered a competing 12-inch 43-ton gun at Elswick Ordnance Company (EOC). Manufacture of this gun lasted from June 1880 to August 1881. The Elswick 43-ton was tested in August 1881. A drawing of the gun showed that its tube was coiled till the muzzle.

When HMS Conqueror was launched on 8 September 1881, the ordering of this gun in May 1880 was repeated, and it was stated that two of these guns would be used to arm Conqueror. However, this might have been conjecture or only an intention.

=== The 43 ton gun Mark I and II ===
In April 1881, there was another heated debate in parliament about the guns for the Royal Navy. George Trevelyan, Parliamentary and Financial Secretary to the Admiralty assured British Parliament that the new battleships Conqueror (1881), Colossus (1882), Collingwood (1882), and Edinburgh (1882) (ex-Majestic) would all carry the 43 ton gun. Of these, Conqueror would have two 43 ton guns, the others would each be armed with four.

The British government then ordered 10 more guns. In October 1881, the steel tubes for these guns were under construction at Messrs. Firth & Sons in Sheffield.

In May 1881, the new 'Ordnance Committee' endorsed a suggestion by Colonel Maitland, Superintendent of the Royal Gun Factory, for more extensive use of steel in future designs for higher calibers. Maitland also suggested that the breech openings of several guns should be enlarged to admit cartridges of slow burning powder that had the same diameter as the chamber.

Early in 1882, it was decided to make the 12-inch guns on a design very similar to a new design for the 9.2-inch gun. This entailed: Steel coils in front of the trunnion instead of wrought iron ones; a short very wide chamber; a thicker steel core; a barrel that was partly uncoiled near the muzzle. This led to the 12-inch Marks I and II.

In May 1882, Sir William Armstrong of the Elswick Ordnance Company objected to the design of the gun when he was invited to make an offer to manufacture them by contract. It led to many experts getting involved in the design for the new heavy guns. On 18 August 1882, a committee recommended that only steel should be used in future guns.

The suggestions of the experts were approved by the government in Fall 1882, but by then the guns under construction at the Royal Arsenal, i.e. six Mark I and five Mark II, could not be altered. Furthermore, the admiralty urgently wanted to complete the above ships, and therefore liked to use the Mark II pattern for six guns which were on order. (Some say at EOC). On 3 November 1882, the committee reported that this should not be done, because in case of emergency, one could also transfer the six Mark I guns under construction in Woolwich from land service to sea service. This transfer to sea service indeed took place. Overall, 14 Mark I/II guns were made. There is a specific mention that 11 Mark II were made. This would make that there were 3 Mark I guns. A March 1883 statement refers to 4 land service and 11 marine service steel(!) 43 tons guns having been taken in hand.

=== Production problems ===
The production of the 12-inch gun did not go smoothly. A big problem was that the Woolwich arsenal could not cast ingots greater than those required for a 12-inch gun. Large parts therefore had to be cast elsewhere, e.g. the steel tubes under construction by Messrs. Firth & Sons in 1881, see above.

In April 1882, Trevelyan had said that three 43-ton guns would be delivered in December 1882. Two of these for Conqueror and one for reserve. Two more guns would be finished in March 1883 and six more in July 1883. In August 1882, the government admitted that due to questions regarding the gun and its carriage, this planning would not be met.

In March 1884 the Secretary of State for War, the Marquess of Hartington declared that there had been supplied, or in a few days would have been supplied, to the navy ten 43-ton guns. He also stated that three more were under construction. While these guns might have been delivered by then, they were not ready. This had to do with a change in the obturator, which necessitated a change in the breech mechanism. In October 1884, a changed breech piece was expected to be ready in three months.

In July 1885, Colossus (1882) could finally set out to test her armament. First, the machine guns and quick-firing guns were tested. Next, two shots were fired from each of the 6-inch breechloaders. Next the two 12-inch guns in the front turret were tested. Each gun fired four regular grenades of 714 pounds (324 kg) with a reduced charge of 221.5 pounds (100.5 kg) and then six more with a full charge of 295 pounds (134 kg) of brown prismatic powder. So far, the tests were a great success, but this changed when the guns in the aft turret were tested. On the first round of the left gun, the breech apparatus got stuck. It took two and a half hours to repair it. With the second round from the right gun, its breech block could not be run home. This could not be solved before dark, and so the tests ended.

== Characteristics of Mark I and II ==
=== Technical ===
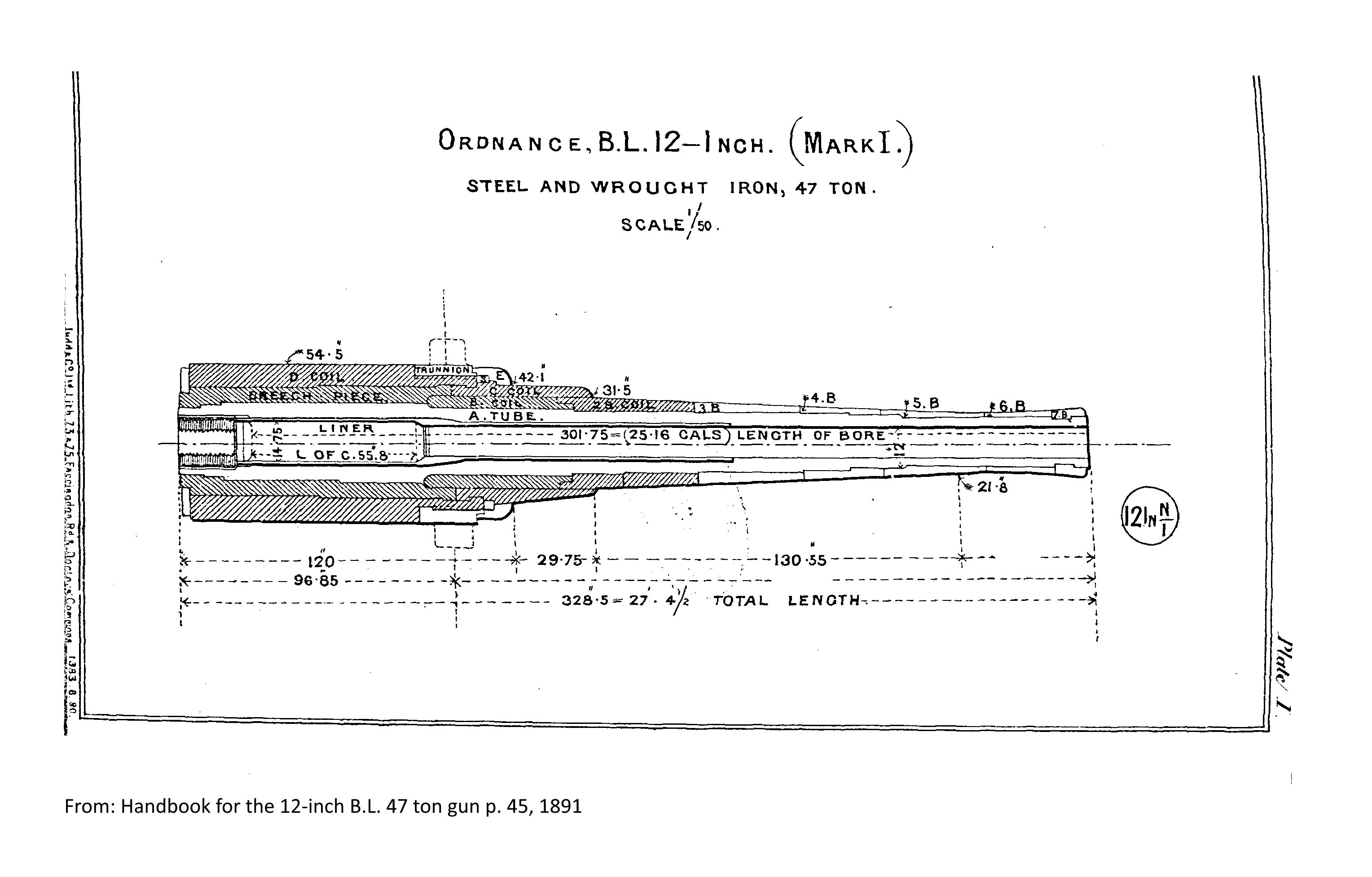
BL 12-inch Mk I-II

The total length of the gun was 27 feet 4.5 inches (8.344 m) (L/27). The length of bore of the gun was 301.75 inches (7.664 m) (L/25). The length of the powder chamber was 56.5 inches (1.435 m) with a diameter of 14.75 inches (0.3746 m) and a capacity of 9,666 in^{3}.

=== Description ===
The Mark I and II gun consisted of a steel inner tube strengthened in front of the powder chamber by shrinking on two steel coils. One was made of medium and the other of mild steel. Over the chamber was shrunk a breech piece of coiled wrought iron, and in front of it another coil of iron overlapping the join of the steel coils. A jacket was shrunk over the breech-piece and locked it to the coil in front of it. A steel trunnion was shrunk to the front portion of the jacket and interlocked with it. A steel ring in segments with a steel hoop shrunk over it was in front of the trunnions to give additional longitudinal strength to the jacket.

A notable aspect of the gun was that the breech mechanism was attached to the inner tube. In later models, this would attach to the breech piece.

The gun was chase-hooped to the muzzle with five steel hoops. It was also lined with a steel cylinder extending from the seat of the obturator to a length of 189 inches (480 cm). This liner was secured at the breech end by a steel ring screwed into the inner tube. These are the changes made after the accident on Collingwood. The guns Nos. 4, 5, 6, 11, 12 and 16 were stamped 1A, because they had different breech fittings.

The only difference between Mark I and Mark II was in the trunnions. The Land Service Mark I had traditional trunnions. The Mark II, intended for Sea Service, had ribs, which allowed to mount the guns closer together on a ship. For use on board EOC designed a new type of carriage. However, later on, the 11 Mark II guns were converted for Land Service and were given trunnions as well as being relabeled Mark I.

The gun soon proved to problematic. The designed charge of 400 pounds (180 kg) could not be used, and was first reduced to 290 pounds (130 kg). Even with this charge, the gun jammed after 16 rounds. The charge was then reduced further to 222 pounds (101 kg), which was the charge that made the gun on Collingwood burst, see below.

== Naval service ==
There were eleven Mark II guns. Ten were installed on the battleships Conqueror (1881) (two), Colossus (1882) (four), and Collingwood (1882) (four). Mk II guns failed in service and were quickly replaced by Mks III. IV and V, with many changes and improvements. The later marks were also mounted on Hero (1885), sistership of Conqueror, and on Edinburgh (1882), sister ship of Colossus.

The two guns for Conqueror (1881) would be mounted in a closed turret.

Collingwood (1882) had four Mark II guns mounted in barbette (i.e. open) towers. In March 1885, twenty four rounds were fired from the front barbette guns of Collingwood. The maximum charge used was 295 pounds (134 kg).

=== Accident on board HMS Collingwood ===
In 1886 an accident with one of the guns of Collingwood changed the fate of the Mark I/II guns. On 4 May 1886, she sailed from Spithead to test the Vavasseur mountings of her aft 12-inch 43-ton Mark II guns. At the very first shot, with a reduced charge, the left gun burst apart about 8 feet from the muzzle. The right gun fired normally. It led to Collingwood's guns begin replaced by the all steel Mark IV's.

The analysis of the accidents with the Mark II gun and a 6-inch gun that burst noted that after these models had been approved, slower burning powder came in. This gave lower maximum pressures, but also higher pressures forward in the bore. It also thought that the large scale introduction of steel probably contributed to the guns being too weak near the muzzle. The accident on board Collingwood led to the special committee limiting the charge of the Mark I and II guns to 295 pounds (134 kg) of cocoa powder.

The special committee also ordered that future heavy guns (i.e. Mks III and IV) be hooped to the muzzle. The I/II was to remain unaltered, and should only be used in emergency until they were hooped to the muzzle. This raised some eyebrows, as it would mean that ships would go to sea with the unsafe Mk. II gun. However, it was later pointed out that the particular weakness of the front part of the muzzle of the gun would only lead to accidents like that on Collingwood, i.e. if it was mounted en barbette. Furthermore, that this dangerous situation was allowed while the country was actively preparing for a war with Russia.

== Coast defence gun ==
Mks I, VI and VII were coast defence versions with trunnions for mounting on recoil slides. They were installed in forts in England at Spitbank Fort, No Man's Land Fort and Horse Sand Fort from 1884 onward and were in active service during World War I.

== Ammunition ==
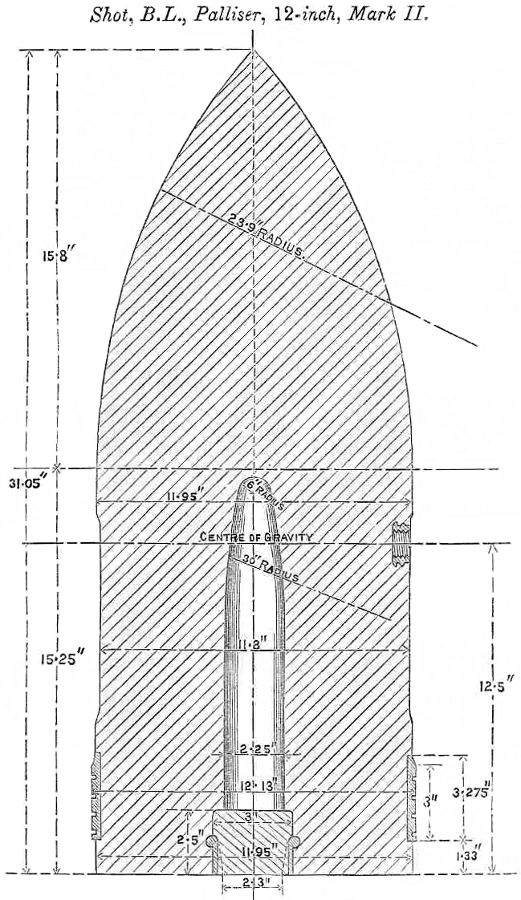
Mk II Palliser shot

== Further development ==
In Fall 1882, the British authorities decided that only steel should be used for future heavy guns, see above. Immediate successors to the Mark I/II were the all-steel Elswick Mk III of 44 ton and Woolwich Mk IV of 45 ton. These led to the BL 12-inch Mk III – VII naval gun models.

The Mk's III-VII had the same length and chamber capacity as the Mk I/II. They also seemed to have the same capabilities as the MK I/II. The common ballistic tables for Mk I - IV, that were made before the 1886 incident on Collingwood also indicated that the internal construction differences were a mere detail. After the incident on board Collingwood, the Mk I/II's were chase hooped, which increased their weight to 47 tons.

However, there are indications that the authorities no longer trusted the MK I/II gun after the Collingwood incident. The Sea Service (S.S.) Mark II guns were made almost identical to the Mk I and relegated to Land Service (L.S.). Their handbook had a warning that the gun should be examined after every 32 rounds. An 1881 warning about the experimental 43 ton gun, had kind of predicted the Collingwood incident and warned against placing the gun in a turret.

== See also ==
- List of naval guns

== Bibliography ==
- "The Annual Visit to Shoeburyness". The Engineer. LII: 73–74, 77. 1881.
- "Foreign Intelligence". The Journal of the Armed Forces. Vol. XVIII. Army and Navy Journal Incorporated. 1880. pp. 421, 441.
- "Foreign Intelligence". The Journal of the Armed Forces. Vol. XVIII. Army and Navy Journal Incorporated. 1881. pp. 897, 962.
- Brassey, Thomas (1886). Brassey's Naval Annual. J. Griffin and Co. Portsmouth.
- Carbutt, E.H. (2 September 1886). "Our Guns". The Pall Mall Budget. The Pall Mall Gazette. p. 8.
- "Supply - Army estimates". Cobbett's Parliamentary Debates. Vol. 277. Cornelius Buck, London. 1883.
- Crispin, S. (1883). "Appendix 19: Report on European Ordnance and manufactures (30 plates)". House documents. Government Printing Office, Washington. p. 211–.
- "The Elswick Ordnance and Engine Works No. III". The Engineer. LII: 73, 77. 1881.
- Handbook for the 12-inch B.L. 47 ton gun Mark I, VI, VII. Her Majesty's Stationery Office. 1891.
- "Supply - Navy Estimates". Hansard's Parliamentary Debates. Vol. 265. Cornelius Buck, London. 1881. pp. 36–98.
- "Supply - Navy Estimates". Hansard's Parliamentary Debates. Vol. 273. Cornelius Buck, London. 1882.
- "Supply - Army Estimates". Hansard's Parliamentary Debates. Vol. 286. Cornelius Buck, London. 1884.
- "Navy Armament of Ships of War - the Conqueror and the Colossus". Hansard's Parliamentary Debates. Vol. 293. Cornelius Buck, London. 1884. p. 525.
- "Navy - H.M.S. Colossus - The 43-ton Guns". Hansard's Parliamentary Debates. Vol. 306. Cornelius Buck, London. 1886.
- "Army Estimates". Hansard's Parliamentary Debates. Vol. 308. Cornelius Buck, London. 1886.
- Hogg, I.V.; Thurston, L.F. (1972), British Artillery Weapons & Ammunition 1914-1918., Ian Allan, London, ISBN 0-7110-0381-5
- Inglis, T. (1880). "Targets for the Trial of Recent Battering Ordnance". Professional Papers of the Corps of Royal Engineers. IV. The Royal Engineer Institute: 169–194.
- Mackinlay, George (1887). Text Book of Gunnery. Her Majesty's Stationery Office.
- "Her Majesty's ship Conqueror". The Marine Engineer. Whitehall Technical Press: 147–148. 1 October 1880.
- Orde Brown, C. (1881). "Lessons to be learned from Krupp's Meppen Experiments of 1879". Journal of the Royal United Service Institution. XXIV. W. Mitchell and Co., London: 61–80.
- "Ordnance". General Information Series. Government Printing Office, Washington: 217. 1885.
- Ordnance College (1902). Text Book of Gunnery. Her Majesty's Stationery Office.
- Simpson, E. (1880). "Wants of the Navy - Cannon I - III". Naval Organization and Administration: Pamphlet Collection. The United Service. p. 647–54.
- Vreeland, C.E. (1889). "The Development of the High-Power Gun". General Information Series. VIII. Office of Naval Intelligence: 135–162.
- War Office (1886). Treatise on the Manufacture of Guns and Text-book of Service Ordnance. Her Majesty's Stationery Office. p. 240.
- "What ought to be done for the navy". The Pall Mall Budget. Vol. 32. 14 November 1884. pp. 7–10.
