= EOC 12-inch L/23.5 =

1860s coastal artillery gun by Krupp

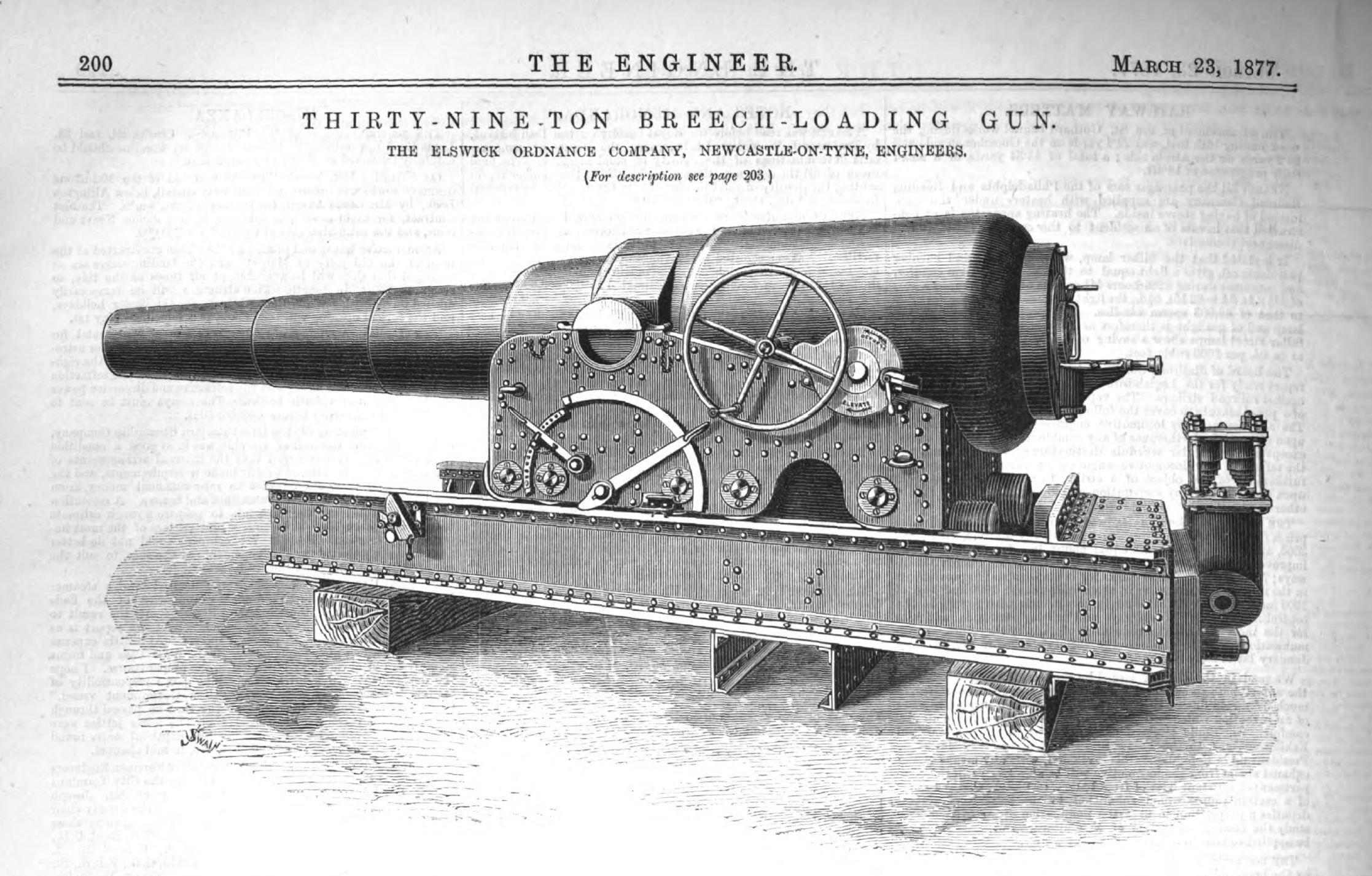
- As depicted in March 1877
- Type: Naval artillery
- Place of origin: United Kingdom

Service history
- Used by: None (prototype)

Production history
- Designer: Elswick Ordnance Company
- Manufacturer: Elswick Ordnance Company
- Produced: 1877
- No. built: 1

Specifications
- Mass: 39 long tons (40 t)
- Length: 282 inches (7.16 m) L/23.5
- Caliber: 12 inches (30.5 cm)
- Muzzle velocity: 1,650 feet per second (500 m/s)

The EOC 12-inch L/23.5 or '39-ton breechloading gun' or '40-ton breechloading gun', was an experimental breechloading gun designed and manufactured by the Elswick Ordnance Company also known as Armstrong. The gun was made to profit from recent discoveries about how gunpowder behaved. These required longer guns and made muzzleloading troublesome. The gun seems to have been a failure.

== Context ==
=== The 12.5-inch 38-ton RML ===
The development of the EOC 12-inch L/23.5 gun, took place at about the same time as experiments with a muzzle-loading gun of almost the same weight, the RML 12.5-inch 38-ton gun. This was basically a RML 12-inch 35-ton gun that had been given a slightly higher caliber and was significantly lengthened to make better use of new kinds of gunpowder. Initial results were very good. In October 1876, the 12.5-inch 38-ton RML was then tested against armor at Shoeburyness. With a charge of 130 pounds (59 kg), a 800 pounds (360 kg) Palliser shell was fired. It went through the target, which consisted of 19.5 inches (500 mm) of iron and 10 inches (250 mm) of teak. Velocity was estimated at 1,420 feet per second (430 m/s). This was again a very good result and plans were made to widen the chamber of the gun.

At the time, 'chambering' a gun meant that its chamber got a diameter that was significantly wider than its caliber. For the 12.5-inch gun this resulted in a chamber diameter of 14 inches (35.6 cm). A test in March 1877 (i.e. after the below test of our L/25.5 gun) proved that this allowed an increased charge of 200 pounds (91 kg) of pebble powder. The projectile weighed 812 pounds (368 kg), of which 12 pounds (5.4 kg) was the gas check. With regard to loading the gun through the muzzle, there were challenges. The first charge could not be rammed down and had to be blown out. The second charge could not be fit in the chamber and stuck out a bit, which negatively impacting the velocity. This was still 1,540 feet per second (470 m/s). The gun later reached 1,560 feet per second (480 m/s) with an 812 pounds (368 kg) projectile.

=== The new Armstrong breechloading system ===
Meanwhile, the Elswick Ordnance Company (EOC) had been working on creating a new breechloading mechanism. This was based on the interrupted screw system used by the French Navy. The obturation method differed. For this the EOC used a steel cup or saucer attached to the end of the breech screw. When the charge exploded, it expanded this cup, which then came to fit on a copper ring in the chamber, forming a seal against escaping gas.

== Development of the EOC 12-inch L/23.5 ==
=== Development ===
Development of the EOC 12-inch L/23.5 started in 1875. It weighed about the same as the RML 12.5-inch 38-ton gun. However, its length of bore of 264 inches (6.7 m) or L/22 showed that it was based on very different ideas than those behind the RML 12.5-inch 38-ton gun with its length of bore of only 198 inches (5.0 m) or L/16. The similarity between the charges of the guns was as deceiving as their weight. In February 1877 (below), the EOC gun fired with a charge of 180 pounds (82 kg), one month later the chambered Woolwich gun fired with a charge of 200 pounds (91 kg) (above).

The deceivingly similar charges can be explained by the fact that it was possible to chamber the RML 12.5-inch 38-ton gun without changing the rest of the gun. On the other hand, the EOC gun could get a longer chamber, because its longer barrel was able to 'consume' the energy of slower burning gunpowder. Both circumstances led to the EOC gun using a high charge without chambering the gun. I.e. the EOC 12-inch L/23.5 was not chambered.

=== Tested near Elswick ===
In February 1877, the EOC 12-inch L/23.5 and a smaller 4.75 inches (121 mm) EOC gun were tested at the Elswick proof ground, some forty miles north of Newcastle. Among those present were: General Campbell, director-general of Artillery and Stores; Colonel Younghusband, Superintendent of the Royal Gun Factory; the naval attachés of: France, Austria-Hungary, Russia, Italy, Brazil; Captain Jessen Director of Danish Naval Ordnance; Captain Müllertz sent by Denmark; Captain Garcia of the Spanish Naval Commission; as well several others.

The tests involved three shots with the 12-inch L/23.5 with measurements of velocity and peak gas pressures. The projectile that was fired weighed 700 pounds (320 kg). With a charge of 160 pounds (73 kg) velocity measurement failed, peak pressures were 15.0 tons per square inch (2,286 atm) at the top of the chamber and 15.1 tons at the bottom. With a charge of 170 pounds (77 kg), velocity was 1,563 feet per second (476 m/s) and pressures were 17.1 at the top and 18.3 ton at the bottom. With a 180 pounds (82 kg) charge, velocity was 1,615 feet per second (492 m/s) and pressures were 18.6 at the top and 18.7 ton per square inch (2,850 atm) at the bottom. One can compare these results with the test of the Krupp 30.5 cm MRK L/25 in 1878.

As the news showed, the tests were not only about the power of the gun, but also about using the Armstrong breech on heavy guns. After the test, it was said that this 'worked perfectly, the breech being easily opened without assistance of any sort, by one man, and with great rapidity. The escape of gas was entirely prevented'.

The results were very promising. However, they said nothing about the endurance of the gun or the breech. For that a durability test (prolonged firing) was required.

=== Quickly becomes obsolete ===
Shortly after 1878, the British War Office received an official comparison of guns with a caliber of about 12-inch. The comparison had been brought about by Krupp successfully testing three heavy artillery pieces in Meppen in July 1878. The Krupp 30.5 cm MRK L/25 was important for the report. The EOC 12-inch L/23.5 was also mentioned, as were a French 12.6 inch 38-ton breechloader, an Italian breechloader, and a 12-inch Russian one of 40-tons. The overview concluded that the short, but chambered RML 12.5-inch 38-ton gun mark II made by the Royal Arsenal, was the most powerful of these guns. I.e. considered only in terms of the energy given to the projectile, the chambered muzzle-loading gun triumphed over 'long guns' like the EOC 12-inch L/23.5.

Meanwhile, smaller guns that were both chambered and long had been made. An August 1878 overview of powerful modern British guns mentioned an Elswick breechloading gun of 6-inch which fired a 70 pounds (32 kg) projectile with the enormous speed of 2,000 feet per second (610 m/s). It also mentioned an Elswick 8-inch 11.5 tons gun firing a 180 pounds (82 kg) projectile with the same velocity.

It was a matter of time before heavier guns would become both chambered and long. During the August 1879 Meppen tests, Krupp demonstrated its prototype 24 cm MRK L/25.5 of 18 ton. It created a sensation, because it was just as powerful as the above 12-inch guns. Only the most recent British guns, like: The BL 9.2-inch Mk I – VII naval gun then under development; the EOC 8-inch 11.5-ton gun; and the EOC 9-inch 18-ton gun, were of comparable efficiency.

When both developments, i.e. the need for longer guns and the advantages of 'chambering' a gun, became clear, the British artillery establishment had to change its stance on breechloading. An obvious reason to do this was that muzzleloaders longer than the 38-ton gun could not be handled in existing works, because they had to be brought in to reload.

Within a few years of first getting tested, the EOC 12-inch L/23.5 had become obsolete because it was not chambered and was not very long. However, this was not the end of the story. A somewhat later lecture about the Meppen tests primarily focused on a comparison between the 40 cm MRK L/25 and the Elswick 100-ton gun. In the audience Stuart Rendel then referred to the EOC 12-inch L/23.5 breechloader made almost five years earlier.

== Characteristics ==
=== Labels ===
On the 1877 engraving, the gun is called a 39-ton gun. Later on, it was called a 40-ton gun, because this was more convenient.

=== Technical ===
The 12-inch L/23.5 had a caliber of 12 inches (30.5 cm). The barrel had a length of 282 inches (7.16 m) or L/23.5 with a length of bore of 264 inches (670.6 cm) or L/22. The gun weighed 39 long tons (40 t). There were 45 grooves of the polygroove type. The twist rate was progressive, increasing from L/100 to L/45, meaning that at the muzzle, the projectile made a turn on its axis every 45 feet (14 m). (Really every 45 calibers, with the caliber happening to be one foot)

The gun fired a 700 pounds (320 kg) projectile. This used copper driving bands and a copper centration bourrelet. The driving band was an attached gas-check, which was pushed into the grooves by the force of the explosion. With charges of 170 pounds (77 kg) and 180 pounds (82 kg) of pebble powder, this reached a mean velocity of 1,606 feet per second (490 m/s) and 1,650 feet per second (500 m/s).
