= HMS Hero (1885) =

Ironclad turret battleship

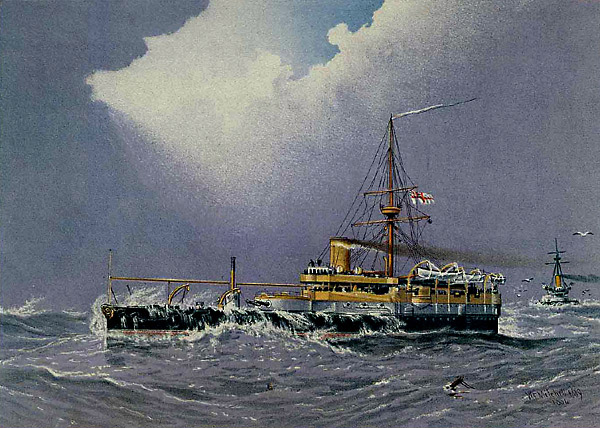
- Painting of HMS Hero by William Frederick Mitchell

History

United Kingdom
- Name: HMS Hero
- Builder: Chatham Dockyard
- Laid down: 11 April 1884
- Launched: 27 October 1885
- Commissioned: May 1888
- Fate: Sunk as target, 18 February 1908

General characteristics
- Class & type: Conqueror-class ironclad battleship
- Displacement: 6,440 long tons (6,540 t)
- Length: 270 ft (82 m)
- Beam: 58 ft (18 m)
- Draught: 21.6 ft (6.6 m) (light); 25.7 ft (7.8 m) (deep load)
- Installed power: 4,500 ihp (3,400 kW)
- Propulsion: 2 × Rennie inverted compound steam engines; 2 × shafts
- Speed: 14 kn (16 mph; 26 km/h)
- Complement: 330
- Armament: 2 × BL 12 in (305 mm) Mk V guns; 4 × 6 in (150 mm) guns; 7 × 6 pdr (2.7 kg) guns; 6 × 14 in (360 mm) torpedo tubes; armoured ram
- Armour: Belt: 12 in (30 cm), tapering to 8 in (20 cm); Citadel: 10.5–12 in (27–30 cm); Turret: 14 in (36 cm) (face), 12 in (30 cm) (sides); Conning Tower: 6–12 in (15–30 cm); Bulkhead: 10.5–11.5 in (27–29 cm); Deck:1.25–2.5 in (3.2–6.4 cm)

HMS Hero was the second and final Conqueror-class battleship. She was an ironclad who served in the Victorian Royal Navy.

The Conqueror-class ships were designed to be improved versions of Rupert with a ram as their main armament. It was assumed by the Board of Admiralty and within Naval Architecture circles that the supremacy of armour over artillery would allow such a ship to ram an enemy vessel without being seriously damaged by enemy gunfire. This assumption was never tested in action.

== Armament ==
The ship carried two big guns in a turret placed on the foredeck. Gunfire over the bow was found to cause serious blast damage to the deck and its structures, while firing abaft the beam caused blast damage to the bridge and superstructure. The guns were limited to a firing arc of some 45° on either side; as they had been installed with the intention of engaging an enemy on the beam who had evaded a ramming attack, this limit was not seen as serious.

Six tubes for the launching of 14 in (360 mm) torpedoes were mounted; they were carried in the after part of the superstructure and were intended to supplement the ram. The smaller guns were for defence against small craft, against whom the main armament could not be easily or economically employed.

By the time she was launched, ramming had been discarded, leaving her and her sister exposed as perhaps the two most useless turret-armed battleships ever built.

== Service history ==
She was commissioned at Portsmouth in May 1888 as tender to the gunnery school Excellent. She remained there until February 1905, when she passed into Dockyard Reserve. She took part in the manoevres of 1888-1891, but saw no other active service. Commander Francis Alan Richard Bowles was appointed in command on 6 February 1900, and was succeeded by Commander George Bowes Hutton who was appointed in command on 6 March 1902.

In March 1900 she completed a series of anchor trials, where stockless anchors were tested successfully against anchors with stocks.

In November 1907, she was made a target ship and was sunk off the Kentish Knock on 18 February 1908.

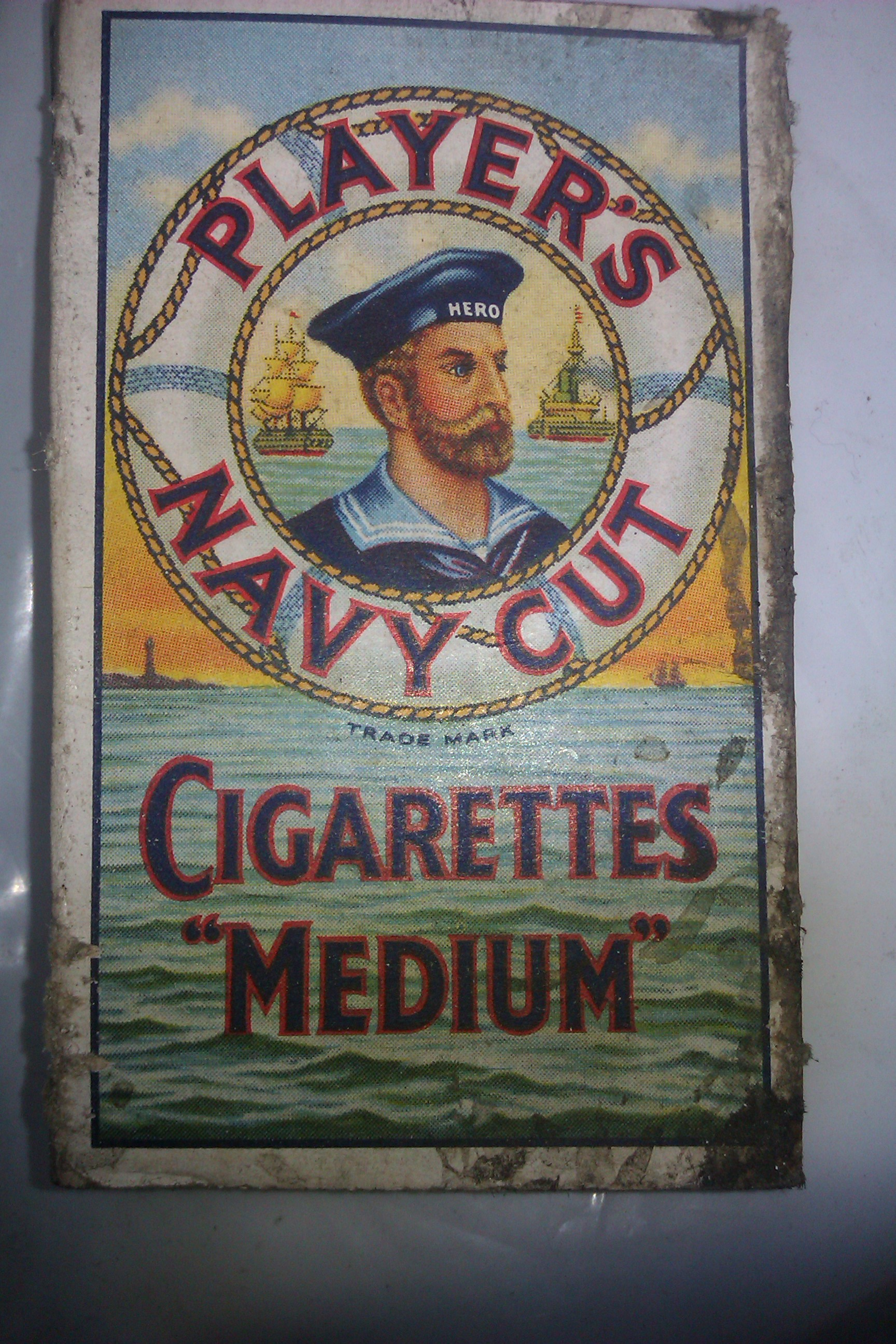
Players Navy Cigarettes

== Popular culture ==
Player's Navy Cut cigarette packages used an illustration of a sailor with a warship in the background. The sailor's cap band reads "Hero"; this does not imply any connection with HMS Hero, but just suggests that all Royal Navy sailors were heroes. (See the accompanying image.)
