= Devastation =

Devastation may refer to:

- HMS Devastation, any of four ships of the British Royal Navy
- La Dévastation, various French warships named Dévastation.
- Devastation (video game), a first-person shooter video game developed by Digitalo Studios, released in February 2003
- Mortal Kombat: Devastation, a cancelled Mortal Kombat film
- Devastation (comics), a fictional character and DC Comics villain in the Wonder Woman comic book
- The Transformers: Devastation, a six-issue Transformers comic miniseries
- Transformers: Devastation, a 2015 unrelated Transformers video game
- The Devastations, a musical group from Melbourne, Australia and based out of Berlin, Germany
- Devastation (wrestling), a professional wrestling tag-team from Canadian independent wrestling
- Acute stress reaction, a psychological condition that causes devastation
- The Devastation, a fictional spaceship in the video game Star Wars: The Clone Wars – Jedi Alliance

== See also ==
- Devastated (disambiguation)
- Devastator (disambiguation)
