= HMS Thunderer (1872) =

Royal Navy Devastation-class turret ship

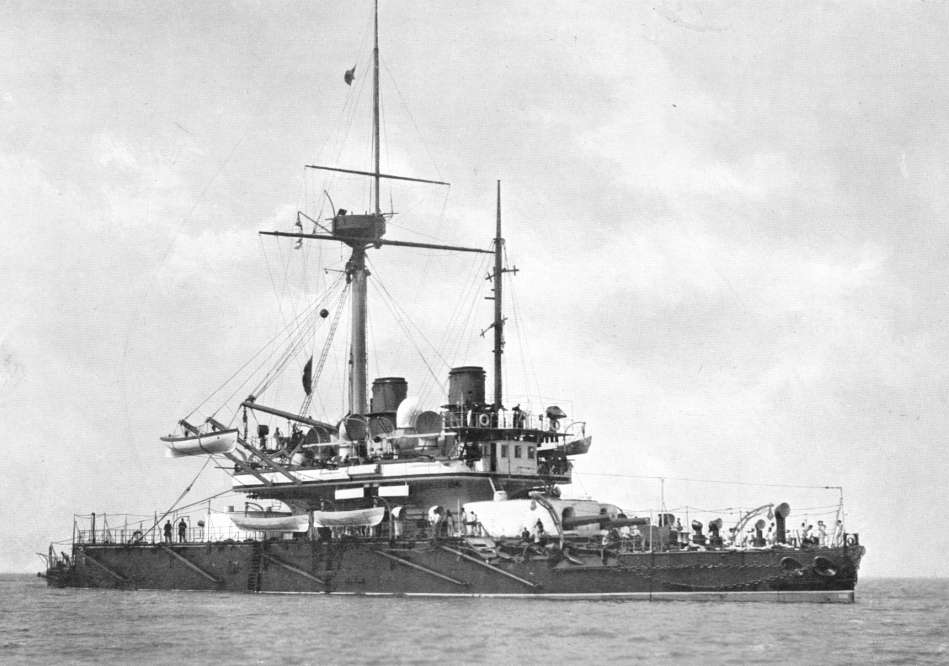

History

United Kingdom
- Name: Thunderer
- Builder: Pembroke Dockyard
- Cost: £368,428
- Laid down: 26 June 1869
- Launched: 25 March 1872
- Completed: 26 May 1877
- Out of service: 1909
- Fate: Sold for scrap, 13 July 1909

General characteristics (as built)
- Class & type: Devastation-class ironclad turret ships
- Displacement: 9,330 long tons (9,480 t)
- Length: 285 ft (86.9 m) (p/p); 307 ft (93.6 m) (o/a)
- Beam: 62 ft 3 in (19.0 m)
- Draught: 27 ft 6 in (8.4 m)
- Installed power: 5,600 ihp (4,200 kW); 8 rectangular boilers
- Propulsion: 2 shafts; 2 Direct-acting steam engines
- Speed: 12.5 knots (23.2 km/h; 14.4 mph)
- Range: 4,700 nmi (8,700 km; 5,400 mi) @ 10 knots (19 km/h; 12 mph)
- Complement: 358
- Armament: 4 × 12-inch (305 mm) rifled muzzle-loading guns
- Armour: Waterline belt: 12–8.5 in (305–216 mm); Deck: 3–2 in (76–51 mm); Gun turrets: 14–10 in (356–254 mm); Conning tower: 9–6 in (229–152 mm); Bulkheads: 6–5 in (152–127 mm)

HMS Thunderer was one of two Devastation-class ironclad turret ships built for the Royal Navy in the 1870s. She suffered two serious accidents before the decade was out and gained a reputation as an unlucky ship for several years afterward. The ship was assigned to the Mediterranean Fleet in 1878 and was reduced to reserve in 1881 before being recommissioned in 1885. Thunderer returned home in 1887 and was again placed in reserve. She rejoined the Mediterranean Fleet in 1891, but was forced to return to the UK by boiler problems the following year. The ship became a coast guard ship in Wales in 1895 and was again placed in reserve in 1900. Thunderer was taken out of service in 1907 and sold for scrap in 1909.

== Background and description ==
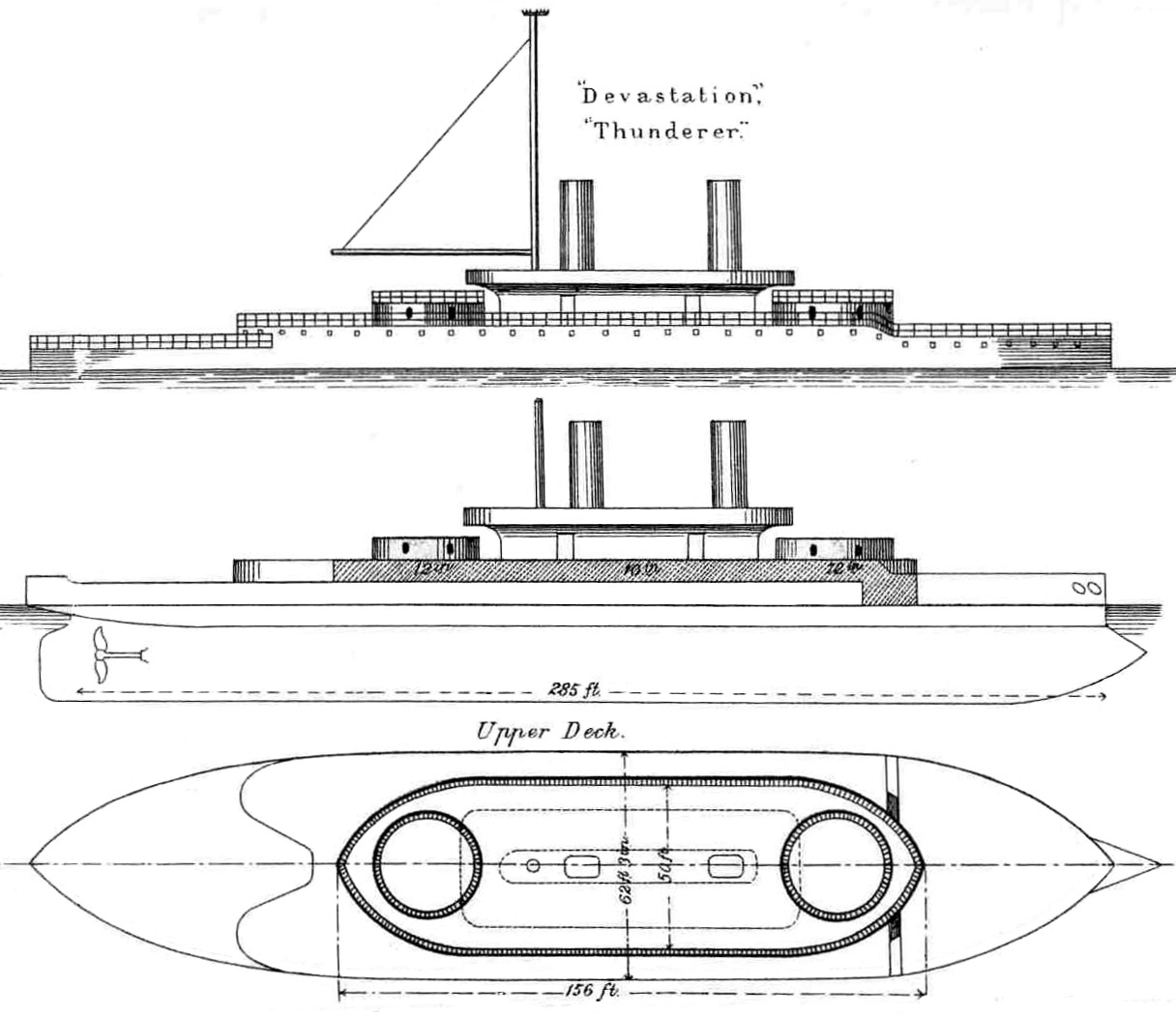
Right elevation and plan from Brassey's Naval Annual, 1888

The Devastation class was designed as an enlarged, ocean-going, version of the earlier Cerberus-class breastwork monitor. The ships had a length between perpendiculars of 285 feet (86.9 m) and were 307 feet (93.6 m) long overall. They had a beam of 62 feet 3 inches (19.0 m), and a draught of 26 feet 8 inches (8.1 m). The Devastation-class ships displaced 9,330 long tons (9,480 t). Their crew consisted of 358 officers and ratings. They proved to be steady gun platforms and good seaboats, albeit quite wet forward. Their low forecastle caused them problems with head seas and limited their speed in such conditions.

Thunderer had two Humphry & Tennant two-cylinder horizontal direct-acting steam engines using steam provided by eight rectangular boilers; each engine driving a single propeller. The engines were designed to produce a total of 5,600 indicated horsepower (4,200 kW) for a speed of 12.5 knots (23.2 km/h; 14.4 mph), but Thunderer reached a maximum speed of 13.4 knots (24.8 km/h; 15.4 mph) from 6,270 ihp (4,680 kW) during her sea trials. The ship carried a maximum of 1,800 long tons (1,829 t) of coal, enough to steam 4,700 nautical miles (8,700 km; 5,400 mi) at 10 knots (19 km/h; 12 mph).

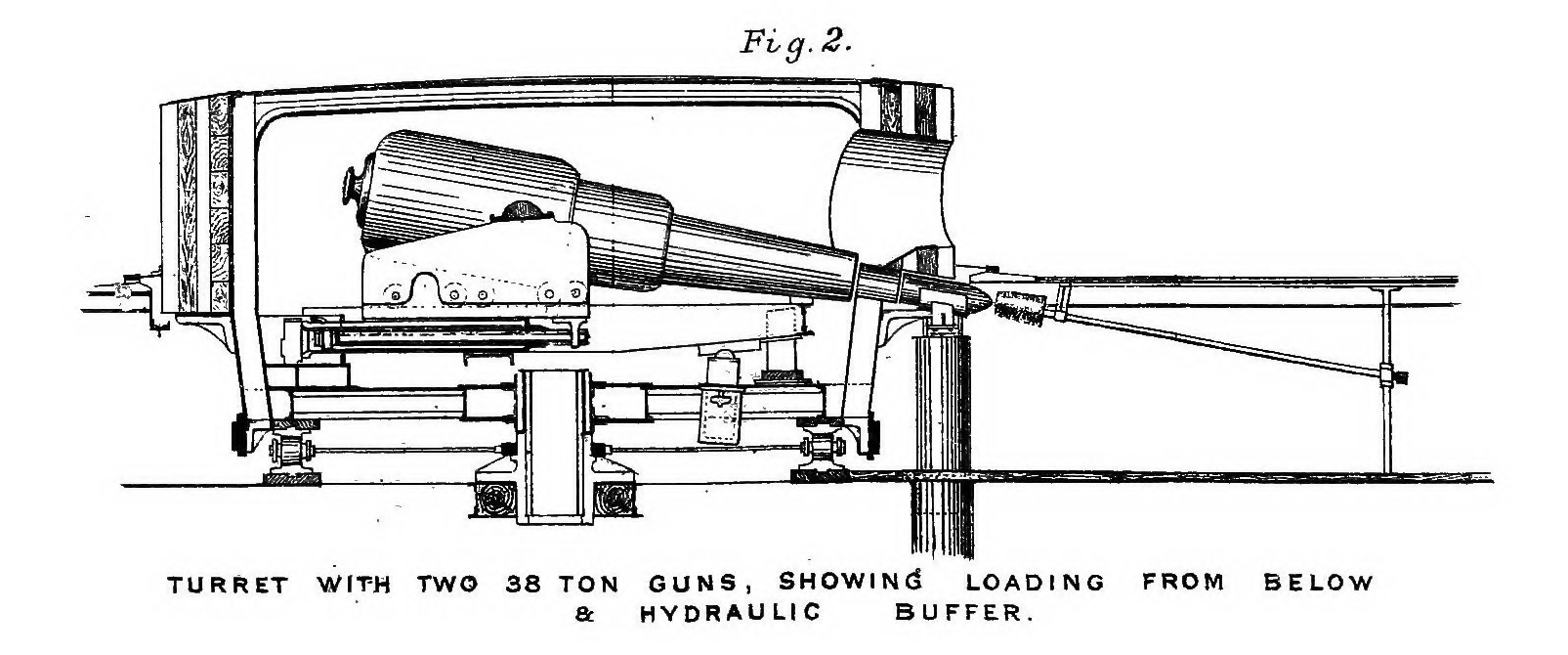
Thunderer's forward turret, as first constructed with manual ramming

The Devastation class was armed with four RML 12-inch (305 mm) rifled muzzle-loading guns, one pair in each of the gun turrets positioned fore and aft of the superstructure. Shortly after completion, Thunderer's forward turret's weapons were replaced by more powerful RML 12.5-inch (318 mm) guns.

While both gun turrets were rotated by steam power, the new forward guns were loaded by hydraulic power, unlike the original guns which were hand worked. Thunderer was the first ship to have hydraulic loading gear. From 1874, the forward turret alone was converted to hydraulic power operation for training (turret traverse), elevation and ramming. This allowed the turret crew to be reduced from 48 to 28; the aft turret remaining hand-worked as a comparison. Power operation was considered successful, although it was later implicated in the 1879 explosion.

The Devastation-class ships had a complete wrought iron waterline armour belt that was 12 inches thick amidships and tapered to 9 inches (229 mm) outside the armoured citadel towards the ends of the ship. The armour plates were tapered to a thickness of 10–8.5 inches (254–216 mm) at their bottom edges respectively and they extended from the upper deck to 5 feet 9 inches (1.8 m) below the waterline. The armoured citadel protected the bases of the gun turrets, the funnel uptakes and the crew's quarters. The sides of the citadel were 12 inches thick around the bases of the turrets and 10 inches thick elsewhere. The turrets were protected by two 7–6-inch (178–152 mm) plates, separated by a layer of teak with the turret face having the thicker armour. The magazine were protected by a 6-inch forward bulkhead and a 5-inch (127 mm) one aft. The conning tower ranged in thickness from 9 to 6 inches. The ships had a complete 3-inch (76 mm) upper deck that was reinforced by another 2-inch (51 mm) thick inside the citadel.

== Construction and career ==
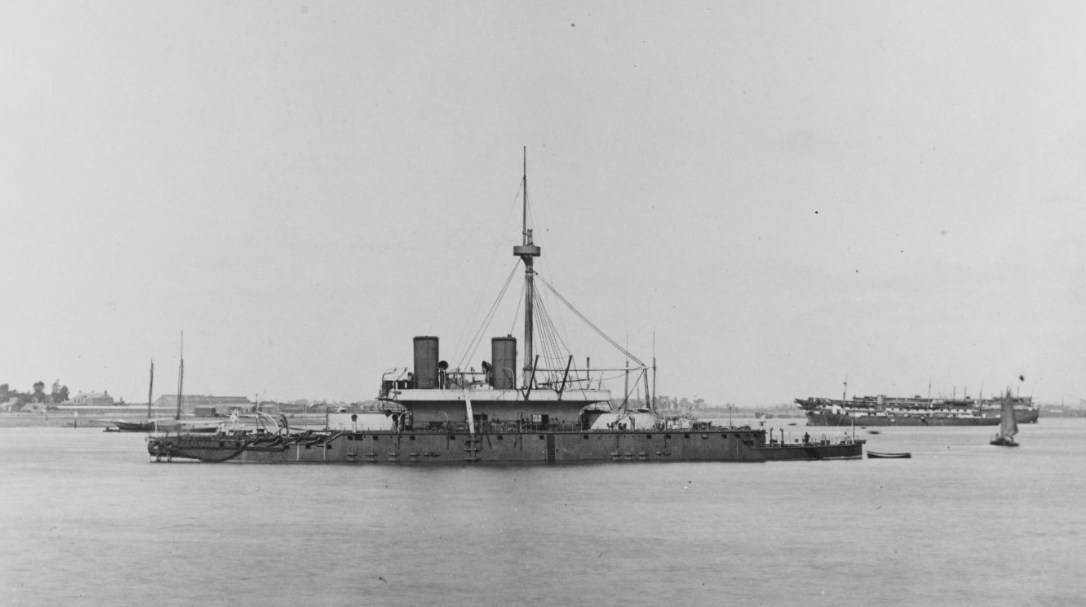
Thunderer at anchor, before 1879

Thunderer, the fifth ship of her name to serve in the Royal Navy, was laid down on 26 June 1869 at Pembroke Dockyard, Wales. Construction was subsequently halted for a time in 1871 to modify the ship to improve her stability and buoyancy by extending the breastwork to cover the full width of the hull which increased the ship's freeboard amidships and provided additional accommodation for the crew. The ship was launched on 25 March 1872 by Mrs. Mary Meyrick, wife of Thomas Meyrick, MP. Two years later she was transferred to Portsmouth Dockyard to finish fitting out.

On 14 July 1876, Thunderer suffered a disastrous boiler explosion which killed 45 people. One of her boilers burst as she proceeded from Portsmouth Harbour to Stokes Bay to carry out a full-power trial. The explosion killed 15 people instantly, including her commanding officer; around 70 others were injured, of whom 30 later died. This was the Royal Navy's most deadly boiler explosion through the whole century. A model representing the failed boiler was made and is now in the Science Museum, London. The explosion was caused because a pressure gauge was broken and the safety valve had corroded in place. When the steam stop valve to the engines was closed, pressure in the boiler rose and could not be released. The four box boilers were the last in service in the Navy and operated at what would even then would have been considered a relatively low pressure, for more modern boilers, of 30 psi (210 kPa). The boiler was repaired and the ship was completed on 26 May 1877 at a cost of £368,428.

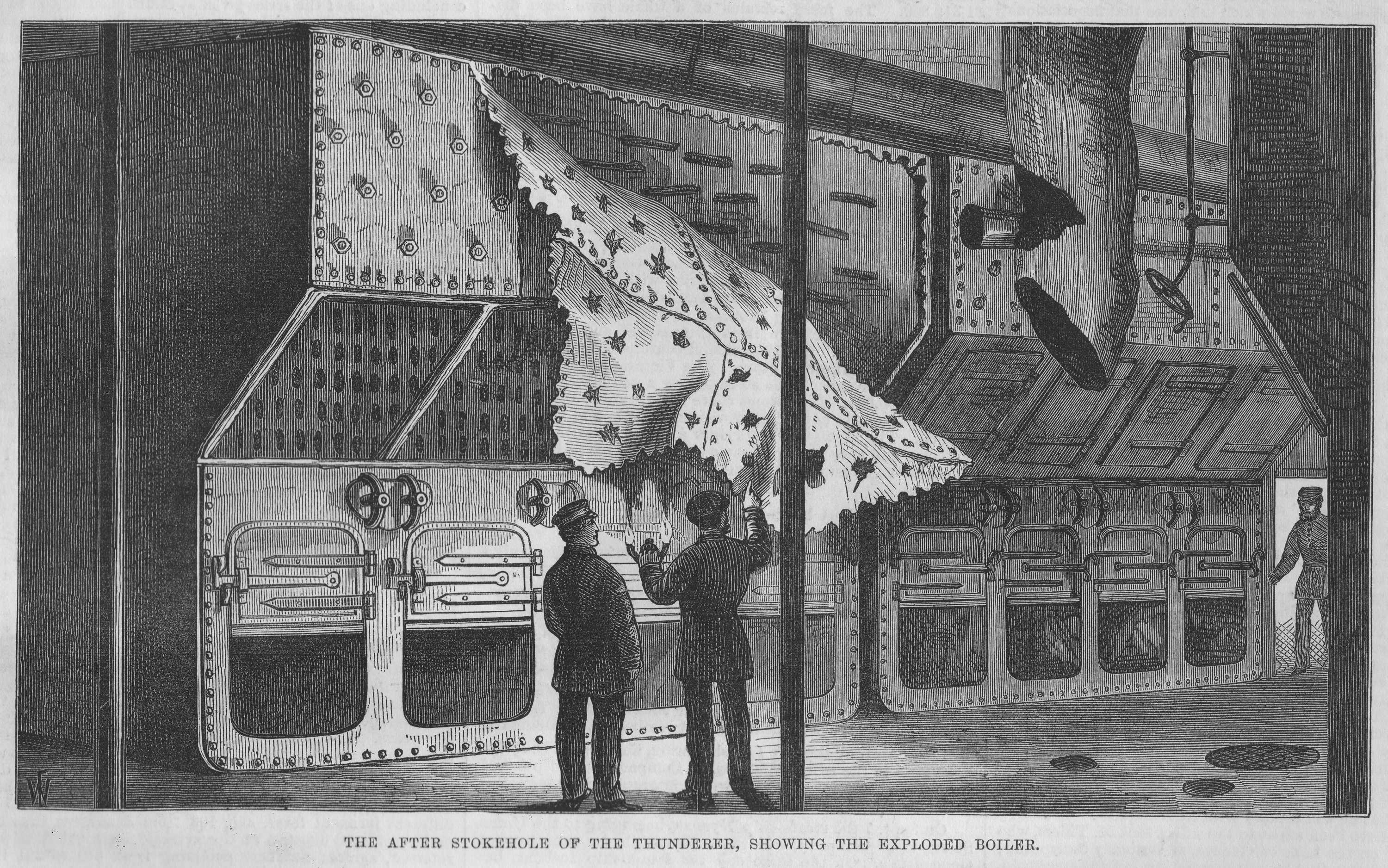
Inspection of the boilers, after their explosion

Thunderer was commissioned in May 1877 for service with the Reserve Fleet Particular Service Squadron and was then assigned to the Channel Squadron. During this time, she was fitted with experimental 16-inch (406 mm) torpedoes. She sailed for the Mediterranean in 1878 under the command of Captain Alfred Chatfield. Leaving Gibraltar for Malta in November 1878, Thunderer ran aground and was damaged. She was refloated and resumed her voyage. She was repaired at Malta.

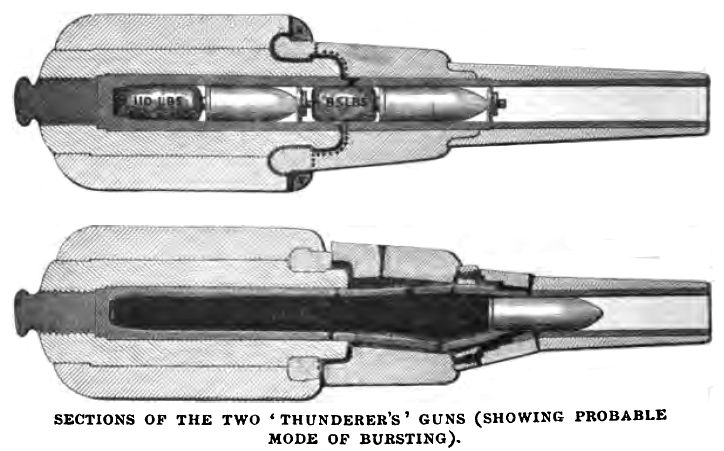
Diagrams showing how the gun burst

The ship suffered another serious accident on 2 January 1879, when the left 12-inch 38 ton gun in the forward turret exploded during gunnery practice in the Sea of Marmora, killing 11 and injuring a further 35. The muzzle-loading gun had been double-loaded following a misfire. According to Admiral of the Fleet E.H Seymour,

"Both turret guns were being fired simultaneously, and evidently one did not go off. It may seem hard to believe such a thing could happen and not be noticed, but from my own experience I understand it. The men in the turret often stopped their ears, and perhaps their eyes, at the moment of firing, and then instantly worked the run-in levers, and did not notice how much the guns had recoiled. This no doubt occurred. Both guns were at once reloaded, and the rammer's indicator, working by machinery, set fast and failed to show how far the new charge had gone."

The accident contributed to the Royal Navy changing to breech-loading guns, which could be more conveniently worked from inside the turrets. The fragments of the destroyed gun were re-assembled and displayed to the public at the Woolwich Arsenal. The committee of inquiry decided that the gun had been double-loaded, but this view was widely questioned, including by Sir William Palliser, designer of the Palliser shell used by these guns. Palliser's view instead was that the shot had been obstructed by a portion of the millboard disc rammed above the shell. Hydraulic power-ramming was thought to be implicated in the double loading as the telescopic hydraulic rammer had not made the double loading obvious, as a manual ramrod would have done. One piece of evidence supporting the double loading theory was the presence of an additional stud torn from a Palliser shell, found amongst the wreckage within the turret. She was repaired at Malta. Thunderer was then regarded as an unlucky ship and was placed in reserve at Malta in 1881 and had her machinery overhauled. Her armament was augmented with a pair of 14-inch (356 mm) torpedo launchers and a half-dozen 1-inch (25 mm) Nordenfelt guns on the hurricane deck. She was recommissioned in 1885 and remained with the Mediterranean Fleet until she was paid off at Chatham Dockyard. The future King George V served aboard Thunderer in 1885–86.

The ship was assigned to the Portsmouth Reserve in January 1888 before beginning a major modernisation the following year. Her guns were replaced by four breech-loading 10-inch guns. To improve her defence against torpedo boats, her Nordenfelt guns were replaced by six quick-firing (QF) 6-pounder 2.2 in (57 mm) and eight QF 3-pounder 1.9 in (47 mm) Hotchkiss guns. Thunderer's machinery was replaced by inverted triple-expansion steam engines and cylindrical boilers. Their increased output of 7,000 ihp (5,200 kW) increased her speed to 14.2 knots (26.3 km/h; 16.3 mph) and their more economical consumption of coal allowed the coal storage to be reduced to 1,200 long tons (1,219 t).

The ship rejoined the Mediterranean Fleet in March 1891, but was forced to return home in September 1892 with persistent boiler problems and she was reduced to the Chatham reserve. Thunderer became the guard ship at Pembroke Dock in May 1895 and remained there until she returned to the Chatham reserve in December 1900. The ship was refitted there as an emergency ship in 1902, but was taken out of service five years later. Thunderer was sold for scrap for £19,500 on 13 September 1909.

The Devastation class became more popular among the civilian population and in the Royal Navy as the ships got older. Rear-Admiral John Wilson, a former captain of the ship, stated in a meeting of the Royal United Services Institute discussing the most acceptable types of battleship in 1884,

"I also agree with my friend Captain Colomb that we have no type of ship to my fancy equal to the Dreadnought or the good old Thunderer. Give me the Thunderer, the hull of the Thunderer; she had bad engines, she was not arranged as I would like inside, she was badly gunned as we all know, and she had not enough light gun or sufficient armaments; but she carried 1,750 long tons (1,780 t) of coal, could steam at 10 knots from here to the Cape, and could fight any ship of her class on the salt water."
