= Spanish ship Doña María de Molina =

Two ships of the Spanish Navy have borne the name Doña María de Molina, after María de Molina (ca. 1265–1321), queen consort of Castile and León (1284–1295) and twice queen regent of Castile (1295–ca. 1301 and 1312–1321):

- Doña María de Molina, a screw corvette in commission from 1869 to 1886
- Doña María de Molina, an Álvaro de Bazán-class torpedo gunboat in commission from 1902 to 1926
