= Doña María de Molina =

Doña María de Molina may refer to:

- María de Molina (c. 1265–1321), queen consort of Castile and León (1284–1295) and twice queen regent of (1295–ca. 1301 and 1312–1321)
- Spanish corvette Doña María de Molina, also known as María de Molina, a Spanish Navy warship in commission from 1869 to 1886
