= HMS Devastation =

Four ships of the Royal Navy have been named HMS Devastation.

- HMS Devastation (1804) was an 8-gun bomb vessel purchased in 1804 and sold in 1816.
- HMS Devastation was to have been a 14-gun bomb vessel. She was laid down in 1820, but was cancelled in 1831.
- HMS Devastation (1841) was a paddle sloop launched in 1841 and broken up in 1866.
- HMS Devastation (1871) was a Devastation-class turret ship launched in 1871 and sold in 1908.
