= HMS Dreadnought (1875) =

1875 ironclad turret ship of the Royal Navy

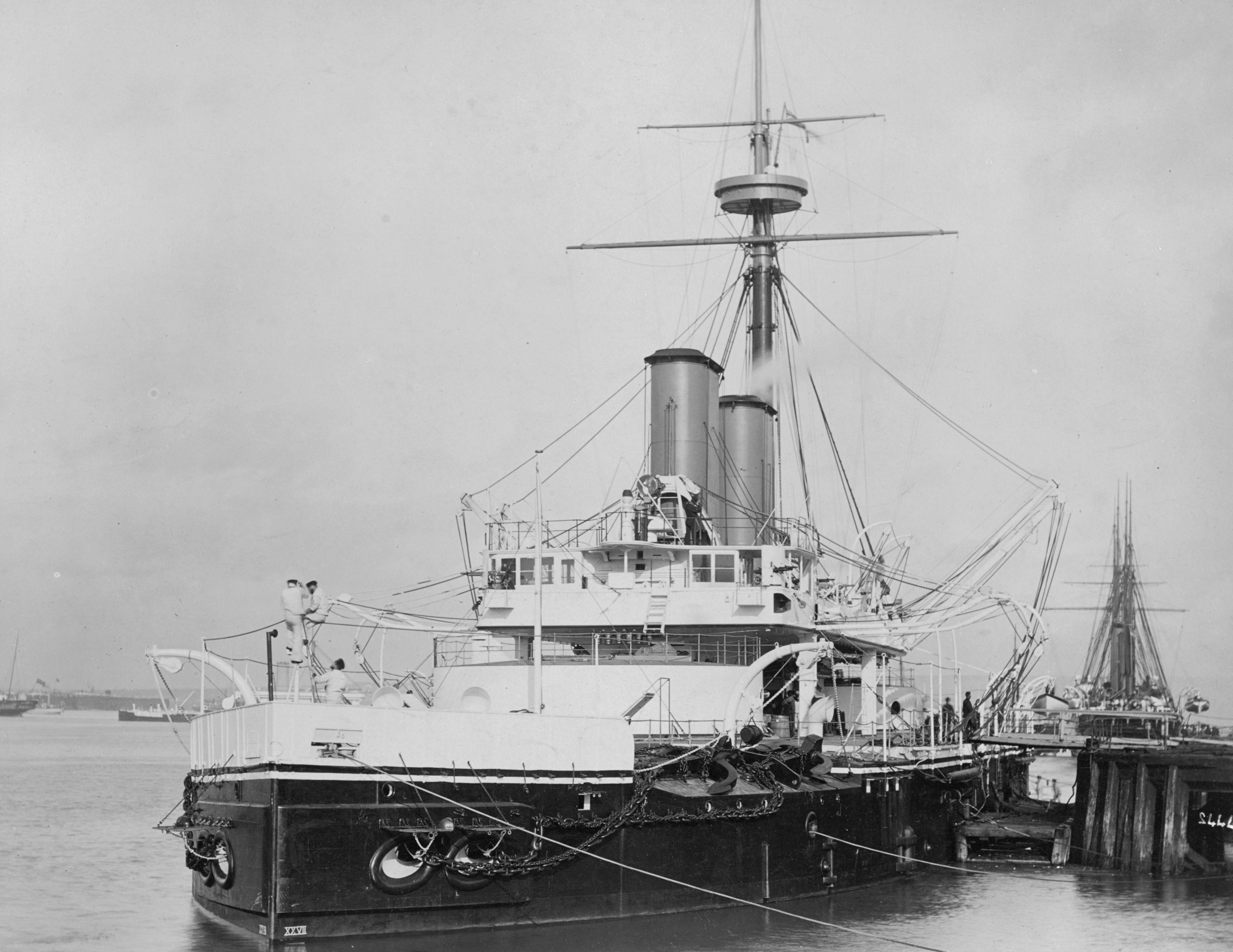
- Bow view of Dreadnought, probably after 1894

Class overview
- Operators: Royal Navy
- Preceded by: Devastation class
- Succeeded by: HMS Inflexible
- Completed: 1
- Scrapped: 1

History

United Kingdom
- Name: Dreadnought
- Ordered: 1870 Naval Programme
- Builder: Pembroke Dockyard
- Way number: No. 2
- Laid down: 10 September 1870
- Launched: 8 March 1875
- Completed: 15 February 1879
- Commissioned: 1884
- Out of service: 1905
- Reclassified: As second-class battleship, 1900
- Fate: Sold for scrap, 14 July 1908

General characteristics (as built)
- Type: Ironclad turret ship
- Displacement: 10,886 long tons (11,061 t)
- Length: 320 ft (97.5 m) (pp) *343 ft (105 m) (oa)
- Beam: 63 ft 10 in (19.5 m)
- Draught: 26 ft 6 in (8.1 m)
- Installed power: 8,206 ihp (6,119 kW); 12 cylindrical boilers
- Propulsion: 2 shafts; 2 compound-expansion steam engines
- Speed: 14 knots (26 km/h; 16 mph)
- Range: 5,700 nmi (10,600 km; 6,600 mi) @ 10 knots (19 km/h; 12 mph)
- Complement: 369
- Armament: 4 × 12.5 in (320 mm) rifled muzzle-loading guns
- Armour: Waterline belt: 14–8 in (356–203 mm); Deck: 3–2.5 in (76–64 mm); Gun turrets: 14 in (356 mm); Conning tower: 14–6 in (356–152 mm); Bulkheads: 13 in (330 mm)

HMS Dreadnought was an ironclad turret ship built for the Royal Navy during the 1870s. Construction was halted less than a year after it began and she was redesigned to improve her stability and buoyancy. Upon completion in 1879, the ship was placed in reserve until she was commissioned in 1884 for service with the Mediterranean Fleet. Upon her return 10 years later, she became a coast guard ship in Ireland for two years. The ship then became a depot ship in 1897 before she was reclassified as a second-class battleship in 1900. Dreadnought participated in the annual fleet manoeuvres for the next two years before she became a training ship in 1902. The ship was taken out of service three years later and sold for scrap in 1908.

== Background and design ==
Dreadnought was originally named Fury and was designed by the Director of Naval Construction (DNC), Sir Edward Reed, as an improved and enlarged version of the preceding Devastation-class ironclad turret ships. The ship was laid down, fully framed and partially plated up to the bottom of the waterline belt armour when work was ordered stopped in 1871 in light of the loss of the ironclad turret ship Captain in a heavy storm the previous year. A Committee on Designs was formed in January 1871 to evaluate existing ship designs with special consideration as to their stability and buoyancy and found that the designs of Devastation and Fury were lacking in both qualities and needed to be modified. Reed had resigned before Captain was lost and he vehemently opposed the changes made by the new DNC, Nathaniel Barnaby and his assistant, William White, himself a future DNC.

The main changes were to increase the beam by 18 inches (457 mm) and widen Reed's armoured breastwork to cover the full width of the hull. This increased the ship's freeboard amidships which improved buoyancy and stability and provided additional, badly needed accommodation for the crew. In addition, the maximum thickness of the armour was increased from 12 to 14 inches (305 to 356 mm), it was extended all the way to the bow and reinforced the ram. Barnaby and White's initial plan was to extend the breastwork fore and aft, almost to the ends of the ship, but this was changed to run all the way to the ends after the results of Devastation's sea trials in 1873–74 revealed that her low bow caused major problems in head seas. Other changes was the substitution of more economical inverted vertical compound-expansion steam engines for Reed's original horizontal, low-pressure engines, more powerful 12.5-inch (320 mm) guns for the 12-inch (305 mm) ones first chosen, and the fitting of hydraulic pumps to work the gun turrets.

== Description ==
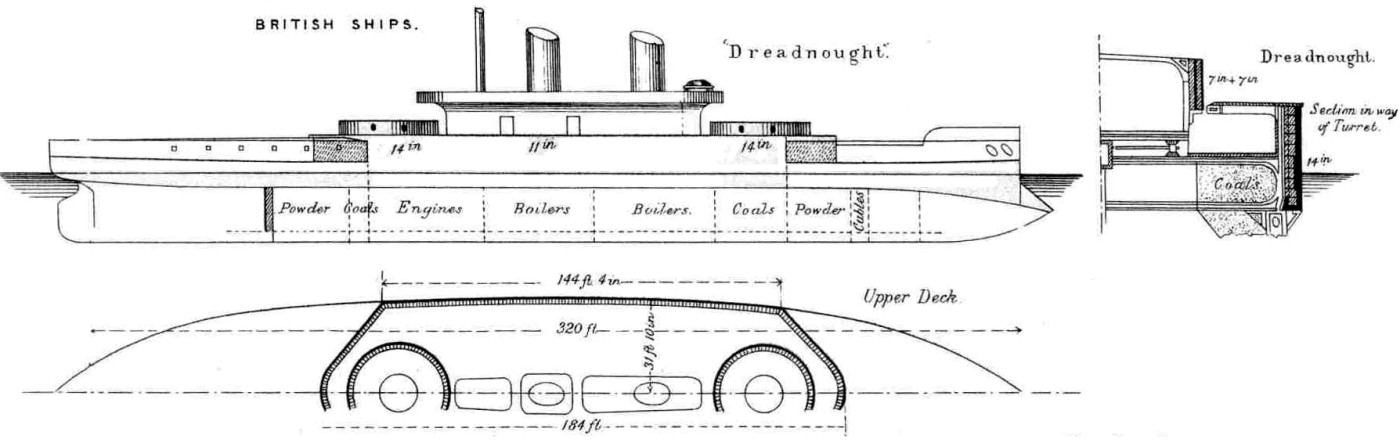
Right elevation and deck plan of Dreadnought as depicted in Brassey's Naval Annual, 1888

Dreadnought had a length between perpendiculars of 320 feet (97.5 m) and was 343 feet (104.5 m) long overall, some 35 feet (10.7 m) longer than the Devastation class. She had a beam of 63 feet 10 inches (19.5 m), and a draught of 26 feet 6 inches (8.1 m). The ship displaced 10,886 long tons (11,061 t). Dreadnought was the first ship to have a longitudinal watertight bulkhead that divided the engine and boiler rooms down the centreline. Her crew consisted of 369 officers and ratings. She proved to be a very steady ship with minimal rolling, although she was very wet as high seas usually swept her deck from end to end.

The ship was the first large ironclad to have two 3-cylinder inverted vertical compound-expansion steam engines. These were built by Humphry & Tennant and each drove a single four-bladed, 20-foot (6.1 m) propeller. Dreadnought's engines were powered by a dozen cylindrical boilers with a working pressure of 60 psi (414 kPa; 4 kgf/cm^{2}). The engines were designed to produce a total of 8,000 indicated horsepower (6,000 kW) for a speed of 14 knots (26 km/h; 16 mph), this was 2,400 ihp (1,800 kW) more and 1.5 knots (2.8 km/h; 1.7 mph) faster than the Devastation class. Dreadnought reached a maximum speed of 14.5 knots (26.9 km/h; 16.7 mph) from 8,216 ihp (6,127 kW) during her sea trials. The ship carried a maximum of 1,800 long tons (1,829 t) of coal, enough to steam 5,650 nautical miles (10,460 km; 6,500 mi) at 10 knots (19 km/h; 12 mph).

Dreadnought was originally intended to be equipped with a pair of RML 12-inch rifled muzzle-loading guns in each turret, but these were replaced by RML 12.5-inch guns while the ship was being redesigned. The shell of the 12.5-inch gun weighed 809 lb (367 kg) while the gun itself weighed 38 long tons (38.6 t). The shell had a muzzle velocity of 1,575 ft/s (480 m/s) and was credited with the ability to penetrate a nominal 18.4 inches (470 mm) of wrought iron armour at the muzzle. The gun turrets were rotated by steam power and loaded by hydraulic power.

The ship had a complete wrought iron, waterline armour belt that was 14 inches (356 mm) thick amidships and tapered to 8 inches (203 mm) outside the armoured citadel towards the ends of the ship. The armour plates were tapered to a thickness of 8 inches at their bottom edge and they extended 3 feet (0.9 m) above the waterline and 5 feet 3 inches (1.6 m) below it. The 184-foot-long (56.1 m) armoured citadel protected the bases of the gun turrets, the funnel uptakes and the crew's quarters. The sides of the citadel were 11 to 14 inches (279 to 356 mm) thick and it had 13-inch (330 mm) thick curved ends. The turrets were protected by two 7-inch (178 mm) plates, each backed by wood. The aft 13-inch bulkhead of the original design was retained, but the forward one was made redundant by the forward extension of the belt. The conning tower ranged in thickness from 14 to 6 inches (356 to 152 mm) and the upper deck was 3 inches (76 mm) thick inside the citadel and 2.5 inches (64 mm) outside.

== Construction and career ==
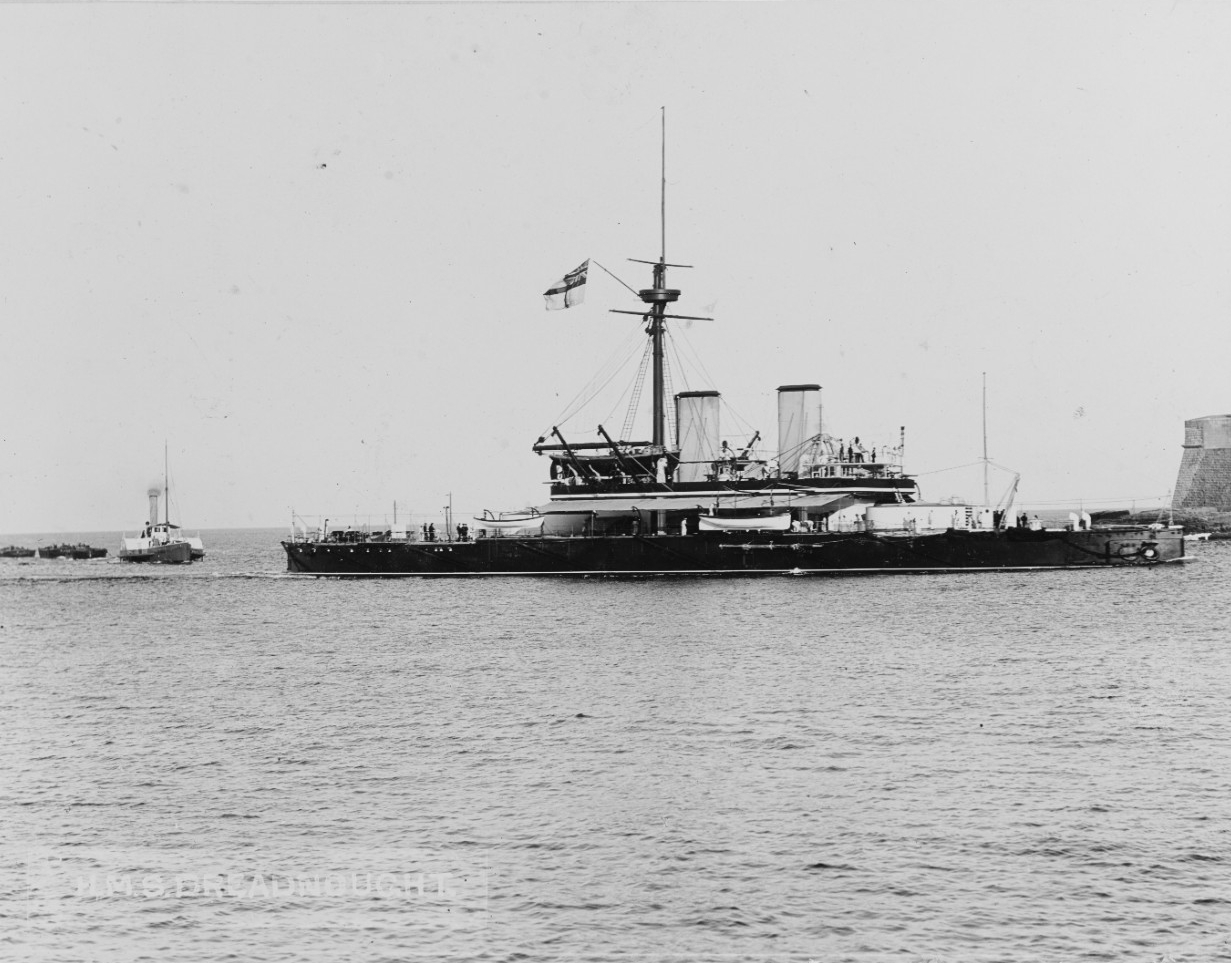
Dreadnought entering harbour, probably before 1885

Dreadnought, the fifth ship of her name to serve in the Royal Navy, was laid down on 10 September 1870 at No. 2 Slip, Pembroke Dockyard, Wales with the name of Fury. Construction was subsequently halted for a time in 1871 to redesign the ship and she was renamed Dreadnought on 1 February 1875. The renamed ship was launched on 8 March by Agnes Wood, daughter of William Courtenay, 11th Earl of Devon. She was completed on 15 February 1879 at a cost of £619,739.

The ship was then immediately placed in reserve until 1884 when she was commissioned for service with the Mediterranean Fleet. Dreadnought was fitted with ten 1-inch (25 mm) Nordenfelt guns on the hurricane deck when she was commissioned. The ship sailed for the Mediterranean Sea on 14 October and remained there for the next decade. The future King George V served aboard in 1886–88. She returned to British waters in September 1894 and began a refit at Chatham Dockyard that included the replacement of her Nordenfelt guns with six quick-firing (QF) 6-pounder 2.2 in (57 mm) and ten QF 3-pounder 1.5 in (37 mm) Hotchkiss guns. Dreadnought became a coast guard ship at Bantry Bay, Ireland in March 1895.

Two years later, in March 1897, she was relieved of that duty and became a depot ship in July at Devonport. The ship was reboilered and had more QF guns installed in 1898. Dreadnought was reclassified as a second-class battleship in 1900 and took part in British fleet manoeuvres in that year and the following one. In June 1902, she was refitted at Chatham to serve as a tender to HMS Defiance, torpedo school ship at Devonport, and later as a depot ship. She took part in the fleet review held at Spithead on 16 August 1902 for the coronation of King Edward VII, and was commissioned as tender four days later, on 20 August 1902. Lieutenant Harry Louis d′Estoteville Skipwith was appointed in command in October 1902. She was taken out of service and transferred to the Kyles of Bute in 1905. The ship was sold to Thos. W. Ward for scrap for £23,000 on 14 July 1908 and was broken up by February 1909.
