= RML 12-inch 35-ton gun =

Ordnance RML 12-inch 35-ton gun
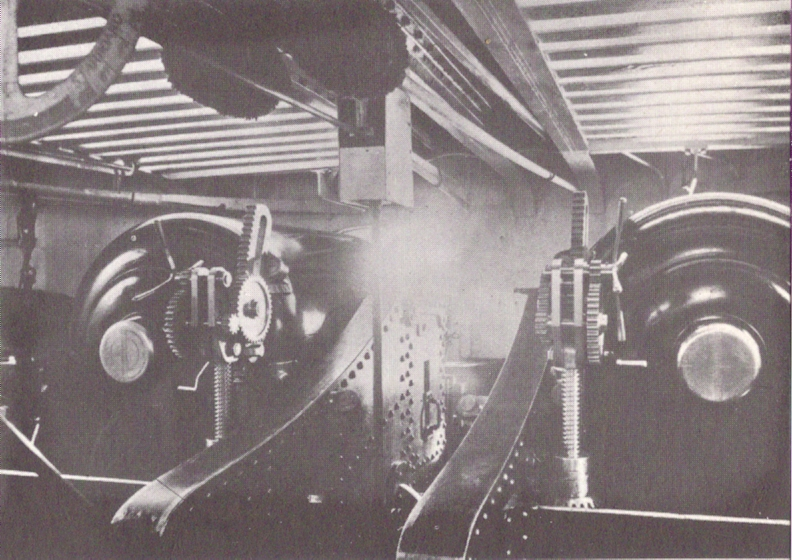
- An interior view of one of the two main battery turrets aboard the British battleship HMS Devastation, showing a rear view of the turret's two 12-inch (305 mm) 35-ton rifled muzzle-loaders. These guns were replaced in 1891 by 10-inch (254 mm) breech-loading rifles.
- Type: Naval gun

Service history
- In service: 1873–1909
- Used by: Royal Navy

Production history
- Designed: 1871
- Manufacturer: Royal Arsenal
- Unit cost: £2,154
- No. built: 15

Specifications
- Mass: 35 long tons (36,000 kg)
- Barrel length: 162.5 inches (4.13 m) (bore + chamber)
- Shell: 706 pounds 12 ounces (320.6 kg) (Palliser); 613 pounds (278.1 kg) (Common & Shrapnel)
- Calibre: 12-inch (304.8 mm)
- Muzzle velocity: 1,390 feet per second (420 m/s)

RML 12-inch 35-ton guns were large rifled muzzle-loading guns used as primary armament on British battleships of the 1870s. They were the longer and more powerful of the two 12-inch British RML guns, the other being the 25-ton gun.

== Design ==
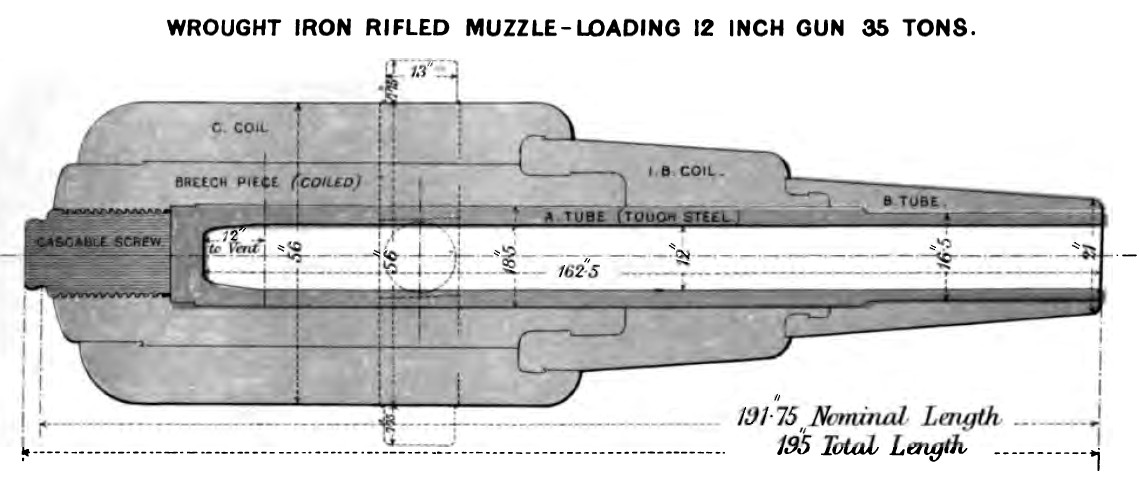
Barrel construction

This gun design originated in 1871 as an 11.6-inch (295 mm) gun firing a 700-pound (317.5 kg) projectile. Results were unsatisfactory, leading to the gun being bored out to 12 inches (305 mm) and firing a 706-pound-12-ounce (320.6 kg) shell.

== Naval service ==
Guns were mounted on:

- Devastation-class battleships of 1873

Note: The two 12-inch guns installed in HMS Thunderer's forward turret were 12.5-inch 38-ton guns bored instead to 12 inches, and designated "12-inch 38-ton", as the necessary 12-inch 35-ton guns were not available. These 2 guns used the same charges and projectiles as the standard 12-inch 35-ton guns installed in Thunderer's aft turret which simplified the supply of ammunition. It was one of these "12-inch 38-ton" guns that was accidentally double-loaded and exploded on 2 January 1879.

== Ammunition ==
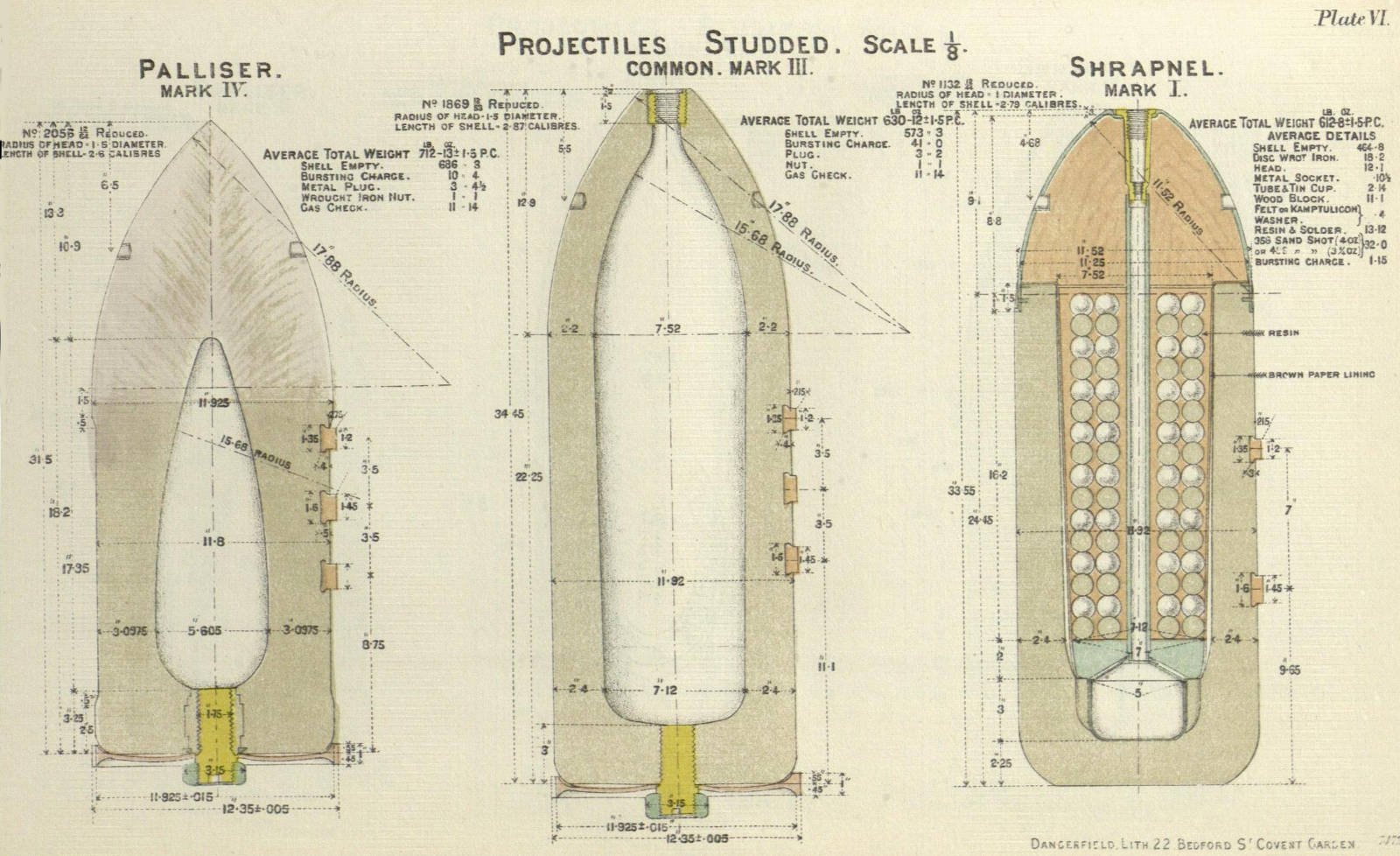
Studded Palliser, Common and Shrapnel projectiles

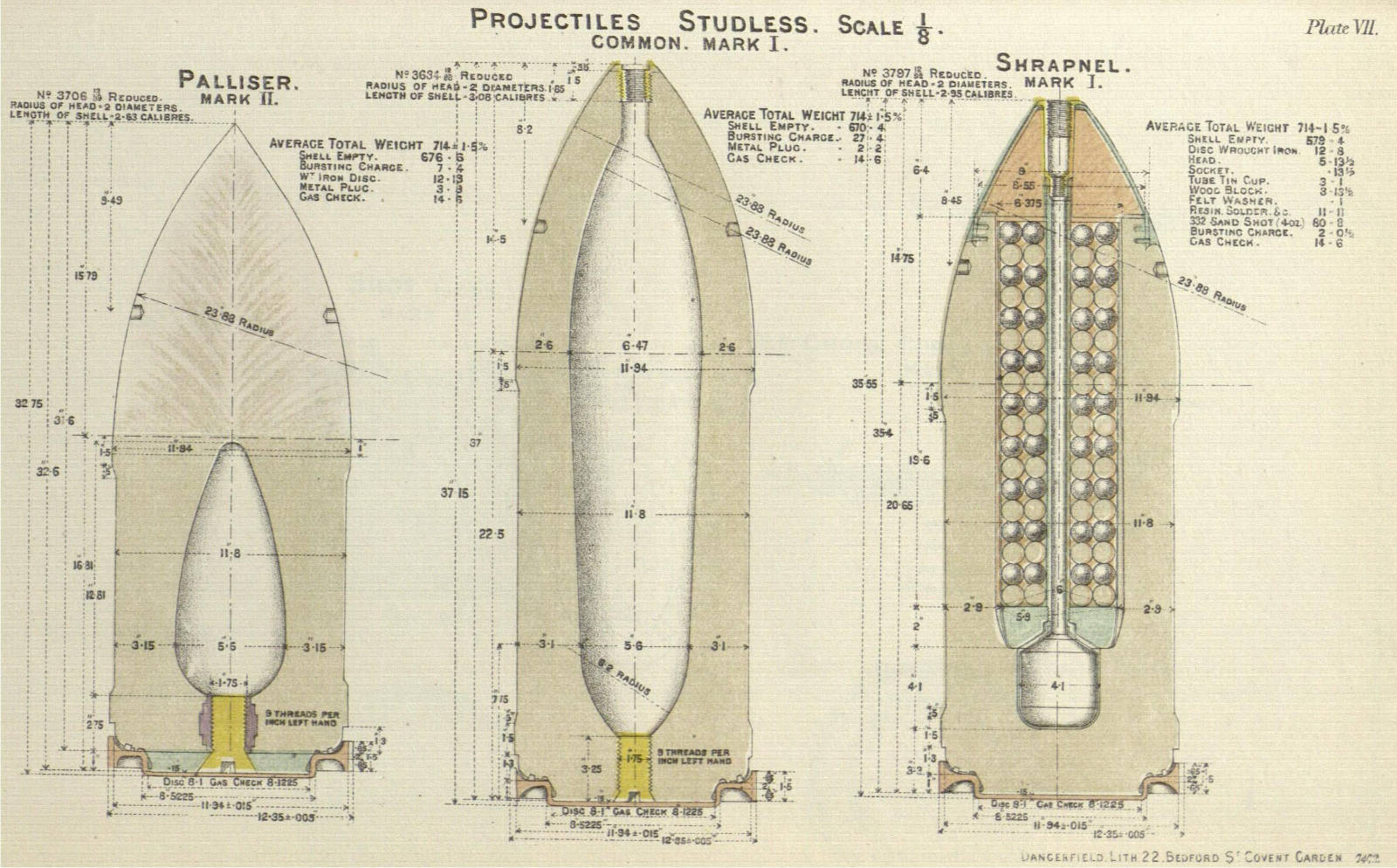
Studless Palliser, Common and Shrapnel projectiles

When the gun was first introduced projectiles had several rows of "studs" which engaged with the gun's rifling to impart spin. Sometime after 1878, "attached gas-checks" were fitted to the bases of the studded shells, reducing wear on the guns and improving their range and accuracy. Subsequently, "automatic gas-checks" were developed which could rotate shells, allowing the deployment of a new range of studless ammunition. Thus, any particular gun potentially operated with a mix of studded and studless ammunition.

The gun's primary projectile was 706 lb (320 kg) "Palliser" armour-piercing shot, which were fired with a "battering charge" of 110 lb (50 kg) of "P" (gunpowder) for maximum velocity and hence penetrating power. Shrapnel and common (exploding) shells weighed 613 lb (278 kg) and were fired with a "full charge" of 85 lb (39 kg) "P" or 67 lb (30 kg) "R.L.G.".

== See also ==
- List of naval guns

== Bibliography ==
- Treatise on the Construction and Manufacture of Ordnance in the British service. War Office, UK, 1877
- Treatise on the Construction and Manufacture of Ordnance in the British Service. War Office, UK, 1879
- Text Book of Gunnery, 1887. LONDON : PRINTED FOR HIS MAJESTY'S STATIONERY OFFICE, BY HARRISON AND SONS, ST. MARTIN'S LANE
- Sir Thomas Brassey, The British Navy, Volume II. London: Longmans, Green and Co. 1882
- "Handbook for the 12-in. R.M.L. Gun of 35-tons (Mark I.) Land Service", 1884, London. Published by Her Majesty's Stationery Office
