= Devastated =

Devastated may refer to:

- "Devastated" (Sam Clark song), a 2010 single by Sam Clark
- "Devastated" (Joey Badass song), a 2016 single by Joey Badass

== See also ==
- Devastation (disambiguation)
