= Devastator =

Devastator may refer to:

== Geography ==
- Devastator Peak, a volcanic summit near the upper Lillooet River in the Pacific Ranges of the Coast Mountains in British Columbia, Canada

== Vehicles ==
- TBD Devastator, a World War II-era torpedo bomber
- USS Devastator (AM-318), a 1943 mine sweeper of the United States Navy
- USS Devastator (MCM-6), a 1988 mine sweeper of the United States Navy

== Video games ==
- Devastator (video game), a 1993 video game by Wolf Team
- Devastators, a 1988 video game by Konami

== Fiction ==
- Devastator (Transformers), a Transformer combiner that is made up of Constructicons
- Devastator, the House Harkonnen forces' heaviest vehicle in the Dune video game Emperor: Battle for Dune
- Devastator (comics), a name shared by two Marvel Comics characters
- Devos the Devastator, another unrelated Marvel Comics character
- Devastator, the Star Destroyer that chases Princess Leia's ship in the opening sequence of Star Wars Episode IV: A New Hope
- World Devastator, a Star Wars planetary weapon that first appeared in Star Wars: Dark Empire
- Devastator, a rocket-launching weapon available in Duke Nukem 3D
- Devastator, a rocket-launching weapon available in the original Ratchet & Clank
- Devastator, a rocket-launching weapon available in Serious Sam 3: BFE
- Devastator, a fictional plane in Crimson Skies and Crimson Skies: High Road to Revenge
- Devastator, an assault BattleMech available in BattleTech

== Other uses ==
- Jennings / Bear Devastator Crossbow
- Devastator (album), 2020 studio album by Phantom Planet

== See also ==
- The Devastator (disambiguation)
