= The Devastator =

The Devastator may refer to:

- Devastator Peak, a mountain in southwestern British Columbia, Canada
- The Devastator Assemblage, a rock unit forming the Mount Meager massif in southwestern British Columbia, Canada
- The Devastator, Darth Vader's flagship Star Destroyer
