= French ship Dévastation =

A number of warships of the French Navy have been named Dévastation or La Dévastation:

- La Dévastation, an ironclad 'floating battery' used in the Crimean War. She was towed to the Black Sea in 1855, and participated in the bombardment of the Russian forts at Kinburn on 17 October 1855, and was scrapped in 1871.
- Dévastation, an ironclad battleship of the French Navy launched in August 1879 and scrapped in 1923.
