= Devastation-class ironclad =

1873 class of British ironclads

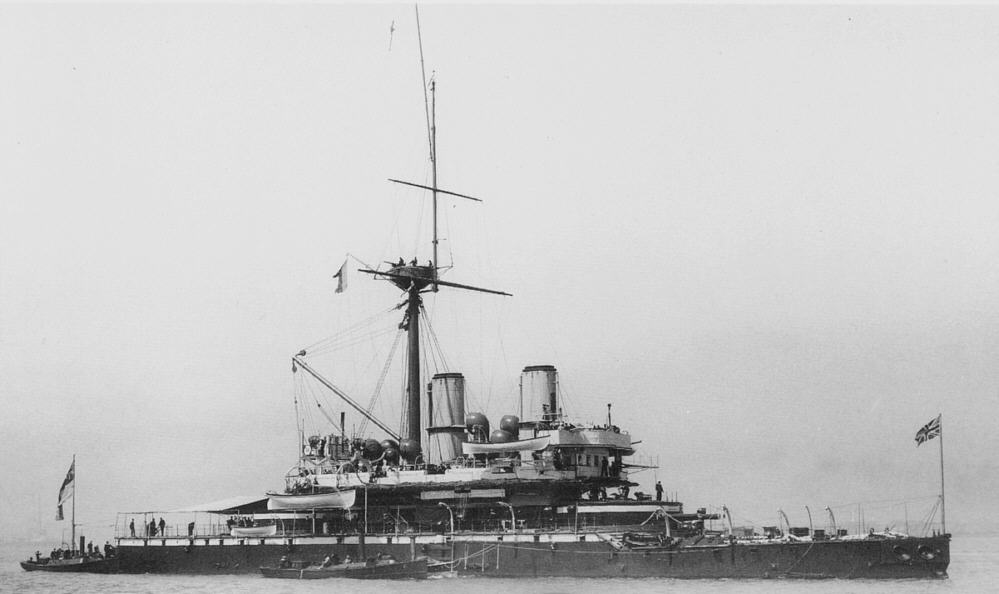
- HMS Devastation in 1896

Class overview
- Builders: Portsmouth Dockyard; Pembroke Dockyard
- Preceded by: HMS Monarch (1868); HMS Captain (1869)
- Succeeded by: HMS Dreadnought (1875)
- Cost: Devastation: £354,000; Thunderer: £358,500
- Built: 1869–1877
- In service: 1874-1905
- In commission: 1873-1909
- Planned: 2
- Completed: 2
- Retired: 2
- Scrapped: 2

General characteristics
- Displacement: 9,330 long tons (9,480 t)
- Length: 307 ft (94 m) oa; 285 ft (87 m) pp
- Beam: 62 ft 3 in (18.97 m)
- Draught: 26 ft 8 in (8.13 m)
- Propulsion: As built: Devastation: 2 × Penn 2-cyl trunk direct-acting steam engines turning 2 screws; Thunderer: 2 × Humphry's 2-cyl trunk direct-acting steam engines turning 2 screws; 8 × rectangular boilers; 1890/92 Rebuild: 2 × Maudslay 3-cyl VTE steam engines turning 2 screws; 8 × cylindrical locomotive type boilers
- Speed: As built: 6,640 ihp (4,950 kW) ND / 13.84 kn (25.63 km/h; 15.93 mph); 1890/92 Rebuild: 7,000 ihp (5,200 kW) ND / 14 kn (26 km/h; 16 mph)
- Range: 1,800 tons of coal; 5,980 nautical miles at 10 knots; 12 days with steam for full speed
- Complement: 410
- Armament: As built: Devastation: 4 × 12 inch RML of 35 tons Mk I naval gun on sliding carriages; Thunderer: 2 × 12 inch RML of 35 tons Mk I naval gun on sliding carriages; 2 × 12.5 inch RML of 38 tons Mk I or II naval gun Bored to 12 inches instead; 1890–92 Rebuild: 4 × 10-inch 32 calibre (25.4 cm) breech-loading naval guns mounted in twin Mark II Turrets; 6 × 6-pounder 8-hundredweight [2.244" 40 calibre (57 mm)] quick-fire Mark I naval gun on Mark I* low-angle single mounts; 8 × Hotchkiss 3-pounder [1.85" 40 calibre (47 mm)] quick-fire Mark I naval gun on twelve Mark I* low-angle single mounts; 5–7 × Nordenfelt multi-barrel guns on pedestal mounts; 2 × Gardner light machine guns; 2 × Whitehead 14-inch (36 cm) torpedo tubes (fixed below waterline)
- Armour: Type: wrought iron with teak or oak backing; Sides: 12 and 10 in (300 and 250 mm); Breastwork: 12 and 10 in (300 and 250 mm); Turrets: 14 and 12 in (360 and 300 mm); Backing: 16–18 inches (410–460 mm) teak or oak; Deck: 3 and 2 in (76 and 51 mm)

The two British Devastation-class battleships of the 1870s, HMS Devastation and HMS Thunderer, were the first class of ocean-going capital ship that did not carry sails, and the first which mounted the entire main armament on top of the hull rather than inside it.

The ships were designed by Sir Edward Reed, whose concept was to produce short, handy ships of medium size as heavily armed as possible with a good turn of speed, that could attack and destroy an opponent without much risk of being damaged during the process.

== Design and development ==
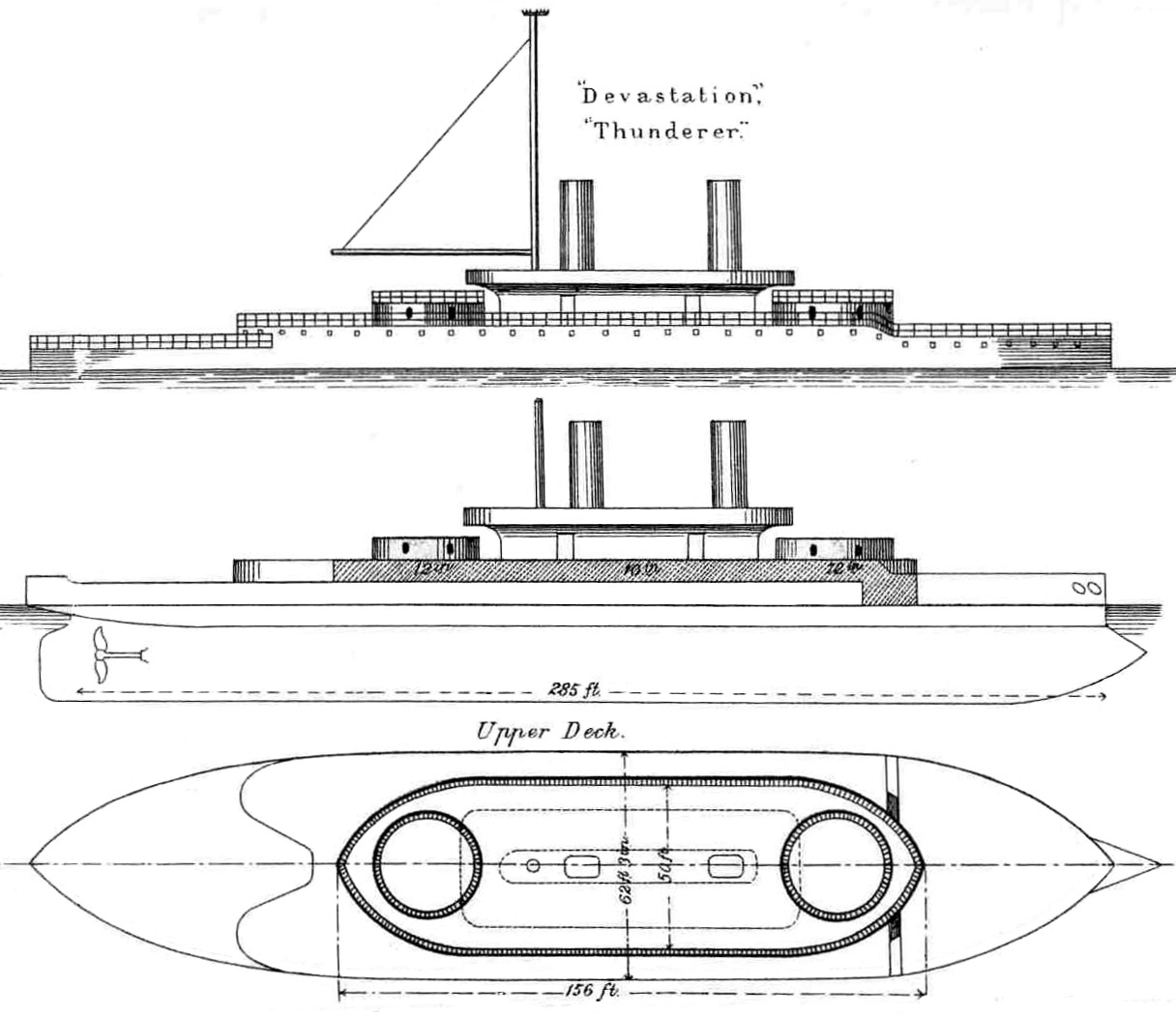
Right elevation and deck plan as depicted in Brassey's Naval Annual, 1887

The Admiralty Design Board set forth the requirements for the ocean-going monitors. These included the requirement of two twin 12-inch gun turrets capable of firing 600-pound shells with a 280-degree firing arc. The turrets would require 14-inch armour protection, with the machinery spaces and shell rooms protected by 12-inch-thick armour. Further, to reduce the interference with the main guns, no masts or sails were needed. The ships would need two steam engines for security and a minimum 12-knot speed. The trans-Atlantic concept was changed to a coastal defence ship, so a very low freeboard of 4 feet 6 inches (1.37 metres) was specified.

The loss of HMS Captain in September 1871 led to concerns about the stability of turret ships, and a special committee was set up to determine their seaworthiness. Changes to the design were recommended. The freeboard of the design was increased to 10 feet 9 inches (3.28 metres). Another change was to extend the armoured breastwork with un-armoured structure to the sides of the ship and carried aft to improve the stability at large angles of heel. This greatly improved the crew comfort by adding extra accommodation and especially latrines, but since it was not armoured it would have been riddled in a battle, reducing the stability of the vessel.

In 1871 a 9-foot-long (2.7 m) model of Devastation was tested in a water tank, and subsequently with an 18-foot-long (5.5 m) version. Once Devastation was completed, tests could be carried out with the real ship. This included building up a roll of 7 degrees by having 400 men run back and forth across the deck 18 times. Other tests involved taking it to sea to look for rough weather, in one trial waves of 20 to 26 feet (6 to 8 m) were encountered which gave the ship a 14-degree roll either way.

In 1872 the armour protection of the turret was subjected to a series of tests. A replica of the proposed turret was constructed and tested at Shoeburyness in May 1872. The 11-inch (280 mm) armour plate backed by 15 inches (380 mm) of teak and a 1.25-inch (32 mm) metal skin resisted hits from a 25-ton 12-inch gun firing at a range of 200 yards (180 m), although one shot hit a joint between plates and opened a gap 7 inches (180 mm) wide but did not penetrate. A second test involved HMS Hotspur firing three shots at the turret of HMS Glatton from a 25-ton gun at a range of 200 yards. The first shot missed, but the second and third shots struck the turret. The turret was not appreciably damaged, though theoretically it should have been penetrated.

== Construction and specifications ==
Both vessels were laid down in 1869 at Portsmouth and at Pembroke. The Portsmouth ship was launched in 1870. Construction on the Pembroke ship was suspended following the loss of HMS Captain and not launched until 1872. They were 285 ft (87 m) in length between the perpendiculars with an overall length of 307 ft (94 m). They had a beam of 62 ft 3 in (18.97 m) and a maximum draught of 26 ft 8 in (8.13 m). They displaced 9,330 long tons (9,480 t). HMS Devastation was completed in 1873 and after a series of stability tests, HMS Thunderer was not completed until 1877 awaiting stability tests on HMS Devastation and a boiler explosion in 1876.

The machinery was initially supplied by Penn for the Portsmouth ship and Humphry's, Tennant & Company of Deptford for the Pembroke ship. The ships were equipped with eight rectangular boilers powering two 2-cylinder trunk direct acting steam engines turning two shafts producing 6,650 indicated horsepower (IHP) under a natural draught (ND) for a designed speed of 13.75 knots. The ships carried 1,800 tons of coal giving a cruising range of 5,980 nautical miles at a nominal speed of 10 knots. The ships could remain at sea for approximately 12 days with fuel available to steam at full speed for a short duration.

HMS Devastation shipped with four 12-inch rifled muzzle-loading (RML) 35-ton Mark I naval guns on sliding carriages, and HMS Thunderer shipped with two 12.5-inch RML 38-ton Mark I or II naval guns that had been bored to 12 inches (fore turret) and two 12-inch RML 35-ton Mark I naval guns on sliding carriages (aft turret). The guns were housed in two round turrets shipped fore and aft on the centreline. The guns would be reloaded under the cover of the turret thereby not exposing the gun crew to enemy fire. To load the guns, they would be trained to approximately 140 degrees on either side of the centreline then moved to the end of their recoil. The muzzles would be lowered towards the deck; the shell and powder track would be raised from the deck below. On HMS Devastation they would be manually raised whereas on HMS Thunderer they would be raised hydraulically. A rammer would ram first the powder and then the shell into the muzzle of the gun. The gun then would be raised and moved to the firing position. The angle of the guns during reloading would be such that, in the event of a premature firing, the shell would exit the hull above the waterline rather than below it. No secondary armament or anti-torpedo boat armament was fitted. In 1879 she was fitted with two Whitehead 14-inch (36 cm) torpedo tubes in fixed mounts, one per broadside below the waterline.

For armour protection the ships were provided with wrought iron plating backed with 18 to 19 inches of teak. The sides of the breastwork were plated with 14 inches of armour. This armour extended below the waterline. It was pierced with square portholes to provide ventilation for the crew spaces. The turrets were protected with 14 inches of plate armour on the front and 12 inches on the sides and rear. Ships built previous to HMS Devastation only had deck armour as part of the structure. HMS Devastation and the ships that followed her were given increasing weight of deck armour. The armoured deck was 3 inches, tapering to 2 inches at the lower edge. The armour plating only applied to the breastwork portion of the ship, and the bow and stern sections were basically unprotected.

=== 1890–1892 reconstruction ===
After the investigation into the boiler explosion on HMS Thunderer revealed the hazards of the rectangular boilers, they were 'taken in hand' for a boiler upgrade and armament change in 1890. Their replacement machinery was supplied by Maudslay, Son & Field of Lambeth. The ships had their boilers replaced with eight cylindrical locomotive type boilers powering two Maudslay 3-cylinder vertical triple expansion (VTE) steam engines turning 2 shafts producing 7,000 IHP under a forced draught (FD) for an increase in speed to 14 knots. The 35 and 38 ton MLRs were replaced with four 10-inch 32 calibre (25.4 cm) breech-loading (BL) naval guns mounted in twin Mark II turrets. With the advent of torpedo boats, a secondary armament was fitted consisting of six 6-pounder 8-hundredweight [2.244” 40 calibre (57 mm)] quick-fire Mark I naval gun on Mark I* low-angle single mounts and twelve Hotchkiss 3-pounder [1.85” 40 calibre (47 mm)] quick-fire Mark I naval gun on Mark I* low-angle single mounts. Seven (Devastation) and five (Thunderer) Nordenfelt 1-inch multi-barrel guns on single-pedestal mounts were also fitted along with two Gardner light machine guns.

== Ships ==
Name	Builder	Laid down	Launched	Completed
Devastation	Portsmouth Dockyard	12 November 1869	12 July 1871	1873
Thunderer	Pembroke Dockyard	26 June 1869	25 March 1872	26 May 1877

== Service and disposition ==
The ships originally conceived as oceangoing breastwork monitors were redesignated as 2nd Class Turret ships in 1886 and finally as 2nd Class Battleships by the 1900s. Both ships served in Home Waters and the Mediterranean during their careers. The concept of the ships was openly assailed by the British press and cost Sir Edward Reed his position as Chief Constructor. However, the ships were excellent sea boats and well thought of by their crews. Both were modernized in 1891 and spent the next ten years as guard ships or in reserve being activated only for the annual summer manoeuvres. Their age (Devastation was 32 years and Thunderer was 28 years in service) condemned them to being removed from the effective list in 1905. HMS Devastation went to the breakers in 1908, followed by HMS Thunderer in 1909. As the first major British warships built without sails, thereby relying solely on steam power, they were the start of modern British battleship design.

== Notes ==
- All ship specifications are from The Illustrated Guide to the Royal Navy and Foreign Navies unless otherwise noted.
- Regarding the class name: These vessels are listed on the March 1901 (Monthly) Navy List as Twin Screw Battle Ship, 2nd Class Armoured. No other class designation has been found on the Royal Navy lists. All the World's Fighting Ships of 1898 lists no class name. Only Conway's All the World's Fighting Ships 1860–1905 is known to list them as the Devastation class.
