= HMS Devastation (1871) =

Devastation-class turret ship

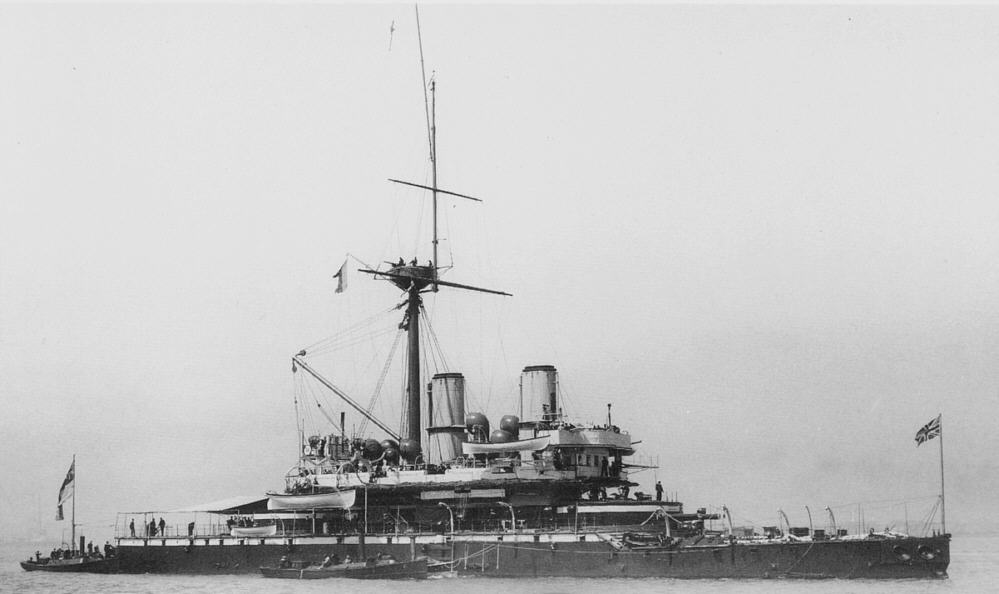
- HMS Devastation in 1896.

History

United Kingdom
- Name: HMS Devastation
- Builder: Portsmouth Dockyard
- Cost: £361,438
- Laid down: 12 November 1869
- Launched: 12 July 1869
- Commissioned: 19 April 1870
- Refit: 1879 and 1891–1892
- Stricken: 1907
- Fate: Scrapped, Thos. W. Ward, May 1908

General characteristics
- Class & type: Devastation-class ironclad
- Displacement: 9,330 long tons (9,480 t) standard; 13,000 long tons (13,000 t) full load
- Length: 285 ft (87 m) p/p; 307 ft (94 m) o/a
- Beam: 62 ft 3 in (18.97 m)
- Height: 27 ft 6 in (8.38 m)
- Draught: 26 ft 8 in (8.13 m) (mean)
- Depth of hold: 18 ft (5.5 m)
- Deck clearance: 4 ft 6 in (1.37 m)
- Propulsion: As built: 4 × 2-cylinder Penn & Sons trunk engines; 8 × rectangular 30 psi (210 kPa) boilers; 6,637 ihp; 2 screws; From 1890: Triple expansion steam engines; Cylindrical boilers
- Speed: As built: 13.84 knots (25.63 km/h; 15.93 mph) (speed trial); From 1890: 14 knots (26 km/h; 16 mph)
- Range: 3,550 nmi (6,570 km; 4,090 mi) at 12 kn (22 km/h; 14 mph); 5,570 nmi (10,320 km; 6,410 mi) at 10 kn (19 km/h; 12 mph)
- Complement: 329–410
- Armament: As built: 4 × 35 ton 12 in (305 mm) muzzle-loading rifles; From 1890: 4 × BL 10-inch (254 mm) guns; 6 × 6-pounder (57 mm) guns; 8 × 3-pounder (47 mm) guns; 2 × 14-inch (356 mm) torpedo launchers (added 1879)
- Armour: Turrets: 12–14 in (300–360 mm); Breastworks and hull: 10–12 in (250–300 mm); Bulkheads: 4–6 in (100–150 mm)

HMS Devastation was the first of two Devastation-class mastless turret ships built for the Royal Navy. This was the first class of ocean-going capital ships that did not carry sails, and the first in which the entire main armament was mounted on top of the hull rather than inside it.

== Design and construction ==
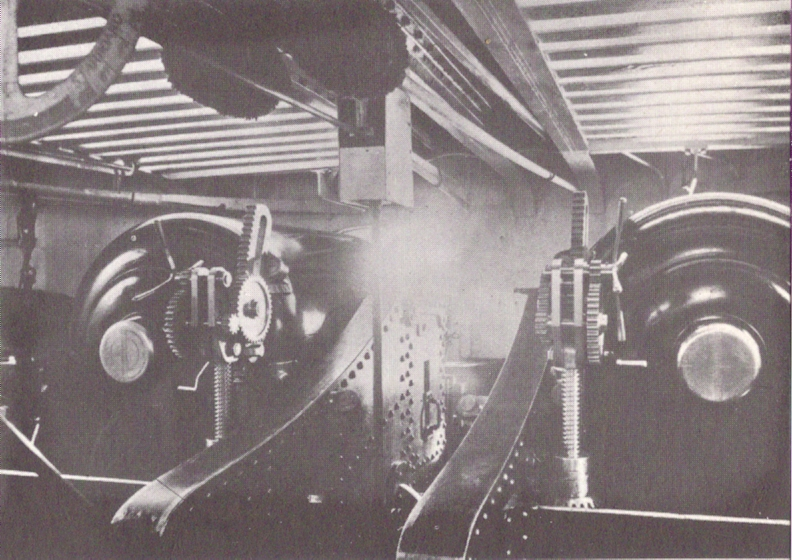
An interior view of one of Devastation's two main battery turrets, showing a rear view of the turret's two 12-inch (305 mm) 35-ton muzzle-loading rifles. These guns were replaced in 1891 by 10-inch (254 mm) breech-loading rifles.

Devastation was built at a time in which steam power was well-established among the world's larger naval powers. However, most ships built at this time were equipped not only with a steam engine, but also with masts and sails for auxiliary power. The presence of masts also prohibited the use of gun turrets since the rigging would obstruct their arc of fire. Devastation, designed by Sir Edward J. Reed, represented a change from this pattern when she was built without masts and her primary armament, two turrets each with two 12-inch (305 mm) muzzle-loading guns, was placed on the top of the hull, allowing each turret a 280-degree arc of fire.

Devastation was the first turret ship built to an Admiralty design. She was 285 feet (87 m) long between perpendiculars, with a beam of 62 feet 3 inches (18.97 m), a mean draught of 26 feet 1.5 inches (7.96 m), and had a freeboard of only 4 feet 6 inches (1.37 m). She was armed with four RML 12 inch 25 ton guns, mounted in pairs in two turrets, protected by armour 12–14 inches (300–360 mm) thick. Her breastworks and hull were protected by 10–12 inches (250–300 mm) of armour, and she was also fitted with a 10–12-foot (3.0–3.7 m) spur bow. The ship had a double bottom, and was divided internally into watertight compartments. She was propelled by two four-bladed screws, 17 feet 6 inches (5.33 m) in diameter, each powered by two direct-acting trunk engines built by John Penn and Sons of Greenwich, providing a total of 5,600 horsepower (4,200 kW), with eight boilers, working at 30 pounds per square inch (210 kPa), giving a maximum speed of 12 knots (22 km/h; 14 mph). Devastation could carry 1,350 tons of coal, giving her a range of 3,550 nautical miles (6,570 km; 4,090 mi) at 12 knots or 5,570 nautical miles (10,320 km; 6,410 mi) at 10 knots (19 km/h; 12 mph). She also carried 30 tons of water, enough for three weeks, and 19 tons of provisions, six weeks' supply for her crew of 329.

Following the loss of the masted turret ship HMS Captain, which capsized and sank on 6 September 1870 with the loss of 500 men, almost her entire crew, a special committee was appointed to examine the design of this type of vessel, and particularly the Devastation. Although they found no reason for concern in the stability of the ship, as a safety precaution a number of changes were made to the design. The freeboard was increased to 10 feet 9 inches (3.28 m), and armour-plated bulkheads, between 4 and 6 inches (100–150 mm) thick, provided additional protection to the magazines and engines. The 25-ton guns were replaced with RML 12 inch 35 ton guns. This additional weight increased her mean draught to 26 feet 8 inches (8.13 m).

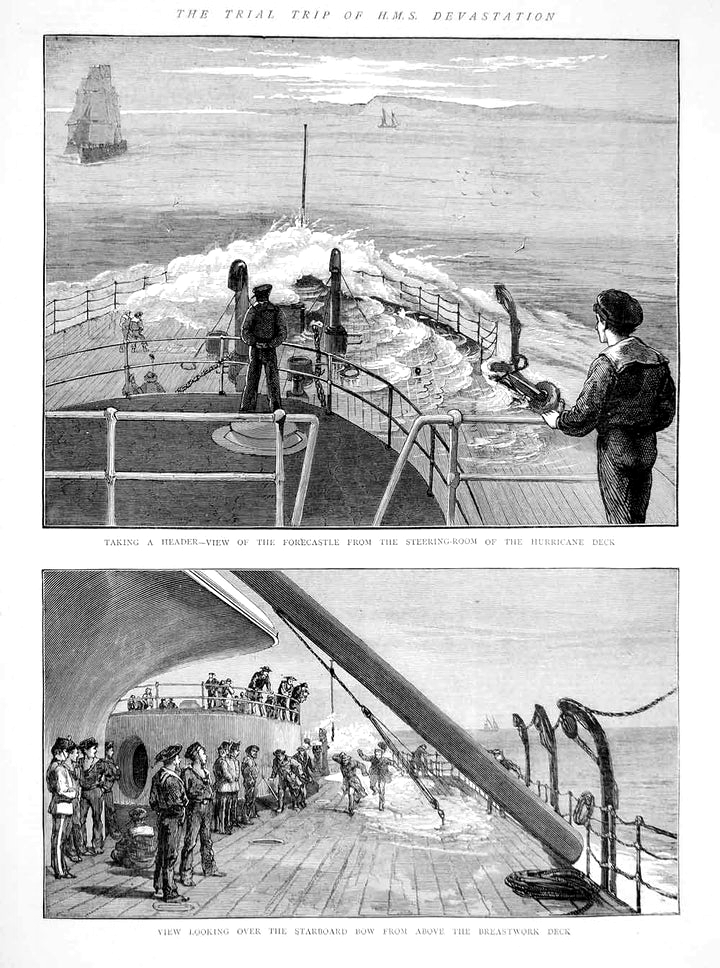
The Trial trip of Devastation. The Graphic, 1873

Sea trials were made in mid-1873 and generated an unusual amount of public interest; not just for the novelty of her appearance, but as the successor to the Captain. In time trials she recorded a speed of 13.84 knots (25.63 km/h; 15.93 mph), the engines producing 6,637 horsepower (4,949 kW). Gunnery trials were made off the Isle of Wight, firing 700-pound (320 kg) Palliser shells. To judge her behaviour in various sea conditions she was then accompanied by the armoured ships Agincourt and Sultan in a voyage from Plymouth to Castletownbere in southern Ireland, and from there she made two cruises out into the Atlantic. Apart from a tendency for her low forecastle to be swept by the sea, she performed slightly better than her companions in both pitch and roll.

== Service history ==
Devastation was deployed to serve in the waters of the United Kingdom and the Mediterranean Sea. In 1891-1892 the 12-inch guns were replaced with Whitworth-built 10-inch breech-loading guns, the Nordenfelt guns were replaced by six 6-pdr and eight 3-pdr guns, and she was refitted with new triple-expansion steam engines.

In November 1898 Captain Frederick Inglefield was appointed as her commander. In March 1900 she is reported to have visited Syracuse, Sicily. From the middle of April 1900 she was guard ship at the port of Gibraltar, until relieved as such by newly commissioned HMS Irresistible in February 1902. She left the Mediterranean station headquarters at Malta, homebound, on 19 February 1902, and after a last visit to Gibraltar arrived in Plymouth on 2 April. She was paid off at Devonport on 18 April, and proceeded to Portsmouth. On 21 June 1902 she was recommissioned as a tender to the torpedo school ship HMS Vernon. She took part in the fleet review held at Spithead on 16 August 1902 for the coronation of King Edward VII.

Later, she was refitted again in 1904 and assigned to the First Reserve Fleet based in Scotland. The ship was sold for breaking up in 1908.

== Popular culture ==
- HMS Devastation is the ship depicted on "England's Glory" matchboxes.
- Her badge was also issued by publishers for use in Monogram and Crest Albums – a popular collecting hobby of the second half of the 19th century.
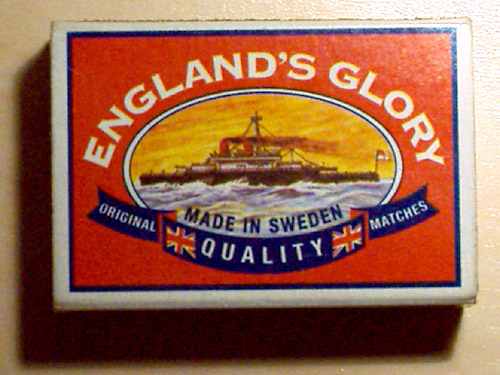
England's Glory matchbox

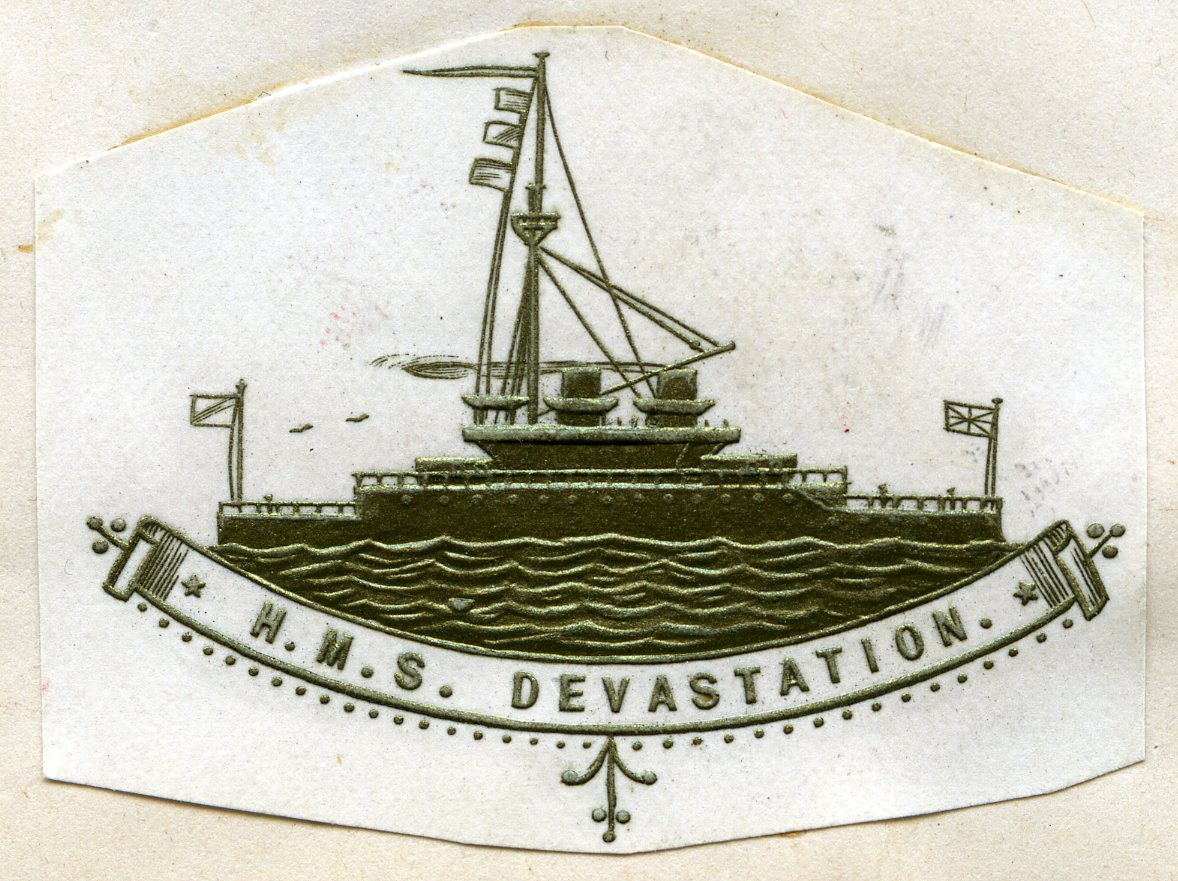
Heraldic badge used on stationery

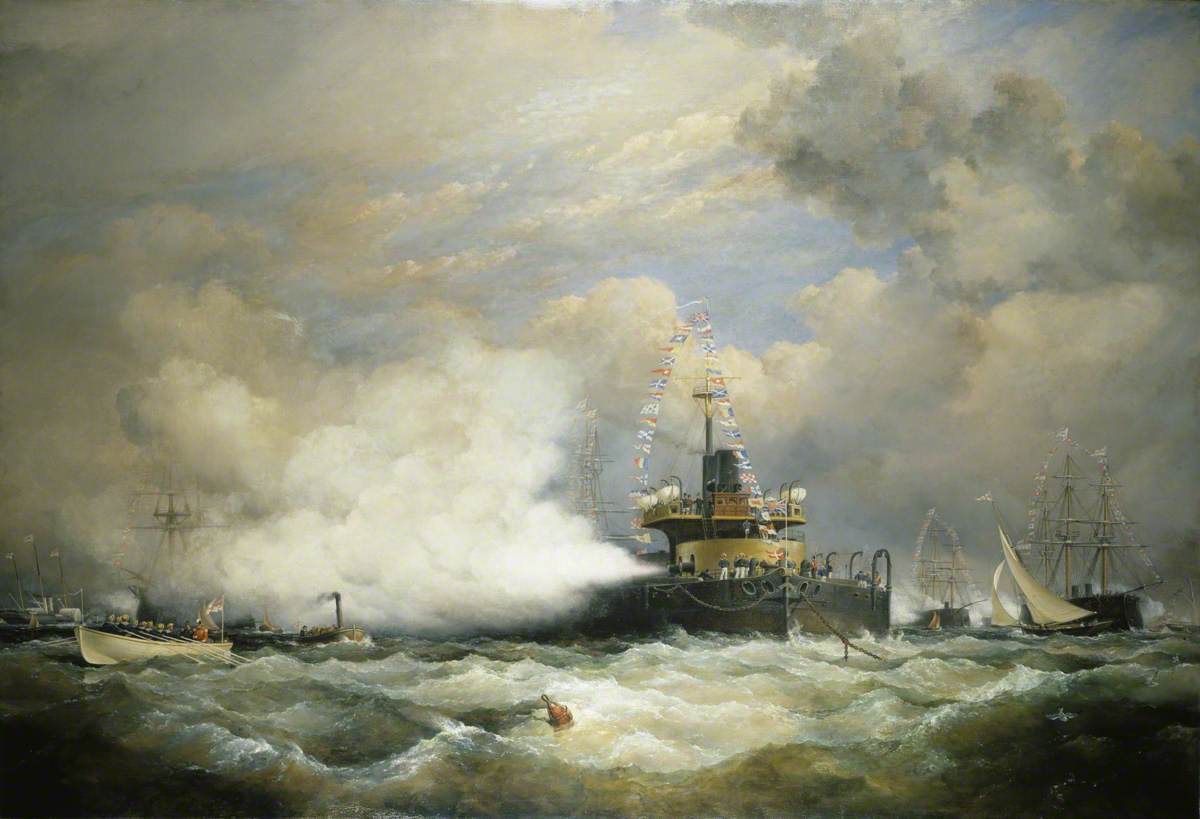
Naval Review in Honour of the Shah of Persia by Edward William Cooke, 1875
