= Spanish corvette Doña María de Molina =

Spanish screw corvette of 1869–1894

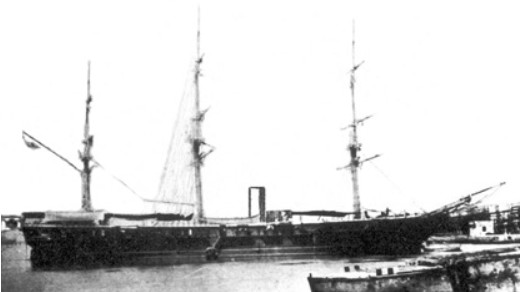

History

Spain
- Name: Doña María de Molina
- Namesake: María de Molina (ca. 1265–1321), queen consort of Castile and León (1284–1295), queen regent of Castile (1295–c. 1301 and 1312–1321)
- Ordered: 23 May 1864 (authorized)
- Builder: Arsenal de La Carraca, San Fernando, Spain
- Laid down: 17 August 1865
- Launched: 29 December 1868
- Completed: 1869
- Commissioned: 1869
- Decommissioned: 8 May 1886
- Fate: Hulked 1887; Stricken 6 January 1894

General characteristics
- Type: Screw corvette
- Displacement: 1,671 tons
- Length: 62.37 m (204 ft 8 in)
- Beam: 11.40 m (37 ft 5 in)
- Draft: 3.12 m (10 ft 3 in)
- Depth: 6.32 m (20 ft 9 in)
- Installed power: 300 hp (224 kW)
- Propulsion: one steam engine, four boilers, one screw, 324 tons coal
- Speed: 7 to 8 knots (13 to 15 km/h; 8.1 to 9.2 mph)
- Armament: As built: 10 x 160 mm (6.3 in) rifled guns; 4 x 80 mm (3.1 in) bronze cannons (for boats); In 1885: 10 x 160 mm (6.4 in) Palliser guns; 4 x smaller guns.

Doña María de Molina, often referred to as María de Molina, was a Spanish Navy screw corvette in commission from 1869 to 1886. She was commissioned under the Provisional Government of Spain (1868–1871) that governed the country after the Glorious Revolution of 1868, and then served under the Kingdom of Spain from 1871 to 1873, the First Spanish Republic from 1873 to 1874, and again under the kingdom after the Bourbon Restoration in 1874.

During early service in home waters Doña María de Molina saw combat in 1873 during the Cantonal Rebellion. She later operated in the Spanish East Indies in East Asia. After she was hulked at Ponape (now Pohnpei) in the Caroline Islands in 1887, she served as a refuge for Spaniards during a violent uprising by native people.

Doña María de Molina was named for María de Molina (ca. 1265–1321), queen consort of Castile and León from 1284 to 1295. María de Molina also served as queen regent of Castile from 1295 until ca. 1301 and again from 1312 to 1321.

== Technical characteristics ==
Sources agree that Doña María de Molina was a wooden-hulled screw corvette with a single screw. Her steam engine had been salvaged from the Spanish Navy screw frigate Petronila, which had been wrecked on the coast of Cuba in August 1863. Doña María de Molina had three masts and a bowsprit.

Sources differ somewhat in their descriptions of her. According to one, she displaced 1,671 tons, was 62.37 metres (204 ft 8 in) long, and had a beam of 11.40 metres (37 ft 5 in), a depth of 6.32 metres (20 ft 9 in), and a draft 3.12 metres (10 ft 3 in). Her engine was rated at 300 horsepower (224 kilowatts) and fed by four boilers, giving her a speed of 8 knots (15 km/h; 9.2 mph), she could carry up to 324 tons of coal, and her armament consisted of ten 160 mm (6.3 in) rifled guns in addition to four 80 mm (3.1 in) bronze cannons for mounting in her boats.

Another source describes her as displacing 1,677 tons and as 62.02 metres (203 ft 6 in) in length, with a beam of 10.97 metres (36 ft 0 in) and a mean draft of 5.15 metres (16 ft 11 in). It states that her engine was rated at 435 nominal horsepower (324 kilowatts) and that she could achieve a speed of 7 knots (13 km/h; 8.1 mph) and could carry up to 330 tons of coal. It describes her 1885 armament — which she carried after her 1882–1884 refit — as ten 6.4 in (160 mm) Palliser guns and four "smaller guns."

== Construction and commissioning ==
After the shipyard at the Arsenal de La Carraca in San Fernando, Spain, ran out of orders for new ship construction, Captain General of Cádiz José María Bustillos proposed to Minister of the Navy Joaquín Gutiérrez de Rubalcaba in October 1863 that the Spanish Navy construct two screw corvettes there. On 23 May 1864, the Spanish government authorized the construction of only one of the proposed screw corvettes. Accordingly, Doña María de Molina′s keel was laid at the Arsenal de La Carraca on 17 August 1865. She was launched on 29 December 1868 and was completed and commissioned in 1869.

== Service history ==
=== 1869–1886 ===
When the Cantonal Rebellion broke out in July 1873, Doña María de Molina was stationed in the Department of Cádiz as part of the Reserve Squadron. In late July 1873 she exchanged gunfire with the rebellious Cortadura, Puntales, and Torregorda forts in the Cádiz area and sustained damage on 29 July 1873. Central government forces defeated Cantonalist rebels in Cádiz in early August 1873, and the overall rebellion collapsed early in January 1874.

Doña María de Molina departed Spain on 20 August 1877 for a deployment to the Philippines in the Spanish East Indies. During her voyage, she visited Cartagena in Spain, Piraeus in Greece, Bessika Bay in the Aegean Sea, Constantinople in the Ottoman Empire, Thessaloniki in Greece, Smyrna and Beirut in the Ottoman Empire, and Port Said in Egypt. After passing through the Suez Canal, she called at Suez in Egypt, Aden, Ceylon (now Sri Lanka), Singapore, and Balabac Island in the southwestern Philippines before completing her voyage on 24 February 1878 with her arrival at Cavite on Manila Bay in Luzon. Upon reaching Cavite, she replaced the screw frigate Carmén, which departed the Philippines for Spain in March 1878.

On 6 February 1880 Doña María de Molina got underway from the Philippines bound for Hong Kong, where she entered dry dock for the maintenance and cleaning of her hull. After completion of the work, she returned to the Philippines, arriving at Manila on 27 February 1880.

Departing Cavite on 11 April 1880 carrying a Spanish delegation to China, Doña María de Molina began a lengthy cruise in the waters of China, Japan, and Korea. She arrived in China at Amoy (now Xiamen) on 18 April and at Shanghai on 30 April. On 1 July 1880 she headed for Japan, where she arrived at Yokohama on 8 July. She subsequently called at Kobe and Nagasaki before returning to Shanghai in early August 1880. During the autumn of 1880, she visited ports in Korea. After a long stay in China, she finally began her return voyage to the Philippines on 4 January 1881, arriving at Manila on the morning of 10 January 1881.

In January 1882, Doña María de Molina got underway in company with the gunboat Panay bound for the Tawi-Tawi archipelago to take possession of Bongao Island in the Sulu Archipelago for the Spanish Empire. Between January and March 1882, she participated in several operations against pirates in the Tawi-Tawi archipelago. After their completion, she departed the Philippines for Hong Kong, where she underwent hull maintenance. She then called at Macau (also known as Macao) before returning to Manila.

Concluding her Philippines deployment, Doña María de Molina began a voyage to Spain on 18 December 1882, calling at Singapore, Point de Galle (now Galle) on Ceylon (now Sri Lanka), Aden, and Suez. She began a transit of the Suez Canal on 1 February 1882, reaching Port Said on its northern end on 3 February. She then crossed the Mediterranean Sea, anchoring at Mahón on Menorca in the Balearic Islands on 16 February. After her arrival at Cartagena on 2 March, she received orders to proceed to the Arsenal de La Carraca in San Fernando and departed Cartagena on 3 March. She reached the Arsenal de La Carraca on 8 March 1882 and began a major refit.

With the work completed, Doña María de Molina finally emerged from the shipyard and returned to service in May 1884. During a crisis with the German Empire — known as the Carolines Question — that arose over the Caroline Islands in the Pacific Ocean, she received orders on 14 September 1885 to deploy to the Philippine Islands again and got underway from Cádiz on 30 September 1885. She transited the Suez Canal and reached Manila on 24 December 1885. However, she arrived with her machinery in such poor condition that she was relegated to service as a pontoon, or floating jetty, soon after her arrival. With her boilers deemed unusable, she was decommissioned by a Royal Order of 8 May 1886.

=== Ponape, 1887–1894 ===
A Royal Order of 1 July 1886 assigned Doña María de Molina to be hulked as a pontoon at Ponape (now Pohnpei) in the Caroline Islands. She departed Manila on 8 March 1887 escorted by the transport steamer Manila and reached Ponape on 31 May 1887. She thereafter was anchored off Santiago de la Ascencion, the Spanish settlement or "colony" on Ponape, as an immobile floating jetty.

On 1 July 1887, Ponape natives working on the construction of a fort revolted against their Spanish overseers. In an exchange of gunfire that day with a contingent of 27 Filipino soldiers commanded by a Spanish Army officer and accompanied by a Spanish civilian construction overseer, Ponapean natives killed the civilian, the officer, and 17 soldiers. After the survivors returned to Santiago de la Ascencion with the news, the colonial governor, Captain Isidoro Posadillo, ordered all Spanish civilians ashore to evacuate to Doña María de Molina while he tried to negotiate an end to the uprising. Boats moving between the shore and Doña María de Molina came under heavy gunfire from Ponapeans surrounding Santiago de la Ascencion on its landward side and six Spanish soldiers were killed during evacuation operations on 2 July, but by the end of that day most of the evacuees, including wounded soldiers, had reached the ship safely.

Ashore, Posadillo took refuge in the island's government house. Finding the Ponapeans determined to drive the Spanish off the island and deeming the further defense of the house untenable as some of his Filipino soldiers deserted to join the natives, Posadillo broke off negotiations early on the morning of 3 July 1887 and he and the last Spaniards with him attempted to reach Doña María de Molina. By prior arrangement, a signal from shore summoned a longboat from Doña María de Molina to pick them up, but as the Spaniards loaded government chests on the longboat, Ponapeans opened fire, prompting the boat crew to panic and begin rowing back to the ship. By the evening of 3 July only Posadillo, his secretary, Santiago de la Ascencion's physician, a second lieutenant, and a few Filipino soldiers remained ashore, completely cut off from the rest of the island and with no provisions. Late on the night of 3–4 July, they attempted to swim to Doña María de Molina, but the Ponapeans opened fire on them, killing all four Spanish officials and some of the soldiers in the shallow water offshore, although a Spanish Army corporal and four Filipino soldiers succeeded in swimming to the ship. At dawn on 4 July 1887, the Ponapeans sacked what remained of Santiago de la Ascencion. In all, 55 Spaniards and Filipino soldiers in their service and 10 Ponapeans died in the fighting between 1 and 4 July 1887. About 70 survivors from Santiago de la Ascencion had crowded aboard Doña María de Molina.

The Ponapeans decided to capture Doña María de Molina and sent two American Protestant missionaries to the ship to negotiate on their behalf, offering to allow all women and children aboard to come ashore safely before they made a final attack on the ship. Doña María de Molina′s commanding officer refused to meet with the missionaries, but the missionaries succeeded in talking the Ponapeans out of the attack. Instead the Ponapeans besieged the ship, whose occupants survived for the next two months by procuring food from Ponapean canoes that visited her to trade.

The outside world knew nothing of the violence on Ponape until 1 September 1887, when the Spanish Navy transport San Quintin arrived for a routine port call with mail and supplies for Santiago de la Ascencion. Shocked by the destruction at Santiago de la Ascencion, San Quintin′s commanding officer transferred the settlement's survivors from Doña María de Molina to San Quintin for transportation to Manila and delivered ammunition and provisions to Doña María de Molina. He then got underway for Manila, leaving behind a detachment of 30 well-armed sailors under the command of San Quintin′s executive officer, Juan de la Concha, to reinforce Doña María de Molina′s crew. De la Concha had orders to hold Doña María de Molina until reinforcements could arrive from Manila and succeeded in doing so. Rather than wait passively for the reinforcements, however, he attempted to take offensive action against the Ponapeans, bombarding Santiago de la Ascencion in an attempt to drive out the Ponapeans there. The bombardment inflicted no casualties on the Ponapeans, and according to one report succeeded only in killing a chicken. He also sent a party of soldiers ashore to raise the flag of Spain over Santiago de la Ascencion, rigging the flag's rope with explosives to prevent its desecration after the soldiers returned to Doña María de Molina.

San Quintin reached Manila on 23 September 1887, bringing news of the uprising to Spanish authorities for the first time. They prepared an expedition to put an end to the uprising, the expeditionary force consisting of three Spanish Navy warships carrying about 700 Spanish Army soldiers and a new colonial governor for the island. The three ships arrived at Ponape on 29 October 1887, and on 31 October the new governor issued a proclamation demanding an unconditional Ponapean surrender and that the Ponapeans turn in all of their weapons, return all Spanish property, and hand over to the Spanish all Ponapeans directly responsible for Posadillo's murder, giving the Ponapeans until 8 November 1887 to comply. The high chiefs of four of the five Ponapean chiefdoms accepted these surrender terms on 7 November 1887. After the new governor threatened a bombardment of the fifth chiefdom, its high chief agreed to the surrender terms as well on the afternoon of 8 November.

Eventually, the Spanish Navy deemed Doña María de Molina′s hull unseaworthy. She consequently was stricken by a Royal Order of 9 January 1894.
