= Palliser shot and shell =

Early British armour-piercing artillery projectile

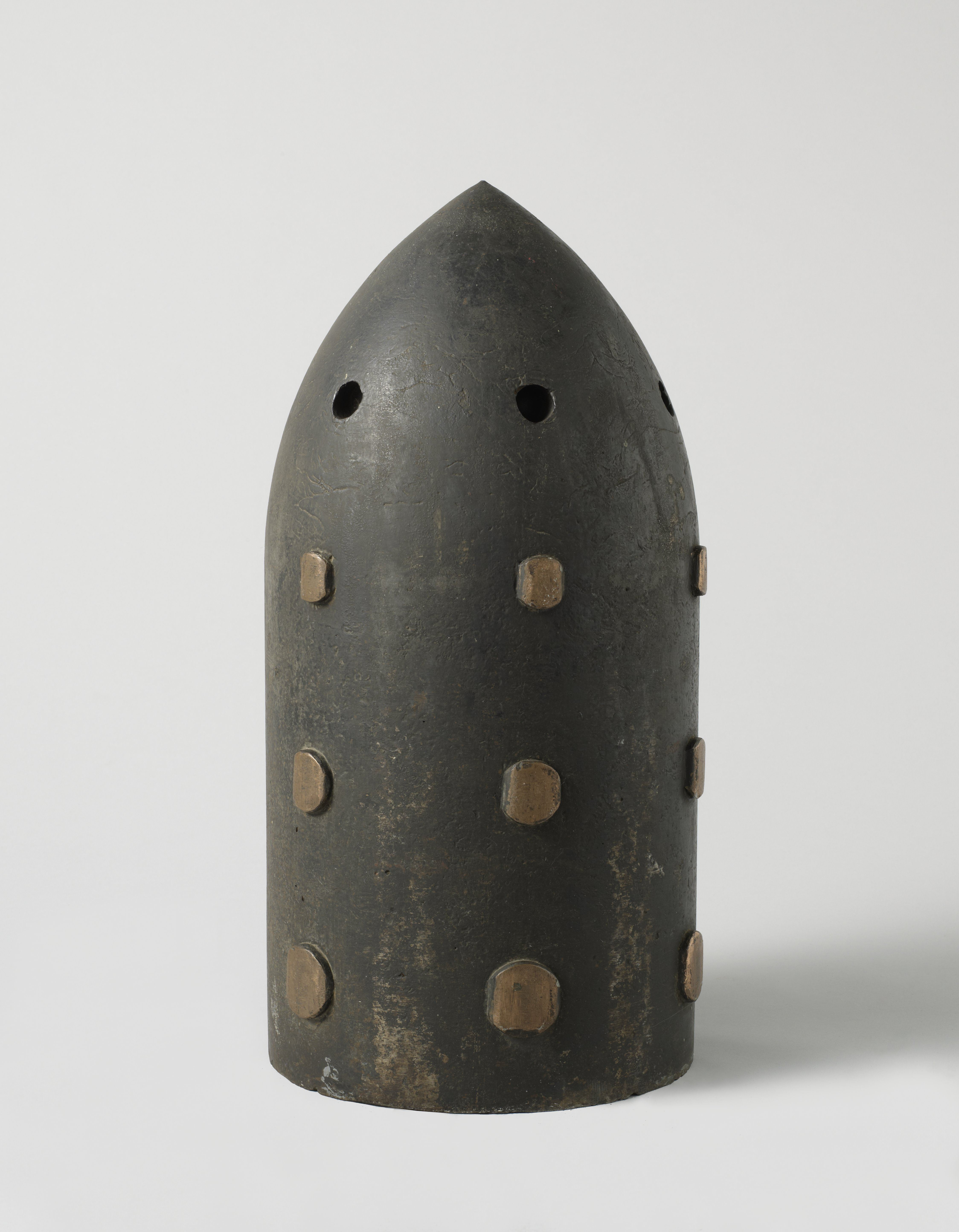
Palliser shot, Mark I, for 9-inch Rifled Muzzle Loading (RML) gun

Palliser shot is an early British armour-piercing artillery projectile which was developed during the late 19th century to defeat the iron and steel armour of contemporary warships and fortifications.

It was invented by Sir William Palliser, after whom it is named. It was the first widely adopted armour piercing projectiles and was a significant advance on the other types of projectiles used in naval gunnery at the time. This was particularly important because of the transition from wooden ships to ironclad at that time. Palliser also invented bolts for securing armour plating, chilled shot for piercing armour and converted smooth fire guns into rifled guns.

== History ==
Major Palliser's shot, approved 21 October 1867, was an improvement over the ordinary elongated shot of the time.

It was adopted for the larger types of rifled muzzle-loading guns rifled on the Woolwich principle (with three rifling grooves). Palliser shot in many calibres stayed in service in the armour-piercing role until phased out of (British) service in 1909 for naval and fortress use, and 1921 for land service.

At the Battle of Angamos (8 October 1879) the Chilean ironclad warships fired twenty 250-pound Palliser gunshots against the Peruvian monitor Huáscar, with devastating results. It was the first time that such piercing shells were used in combat.

== Design ==
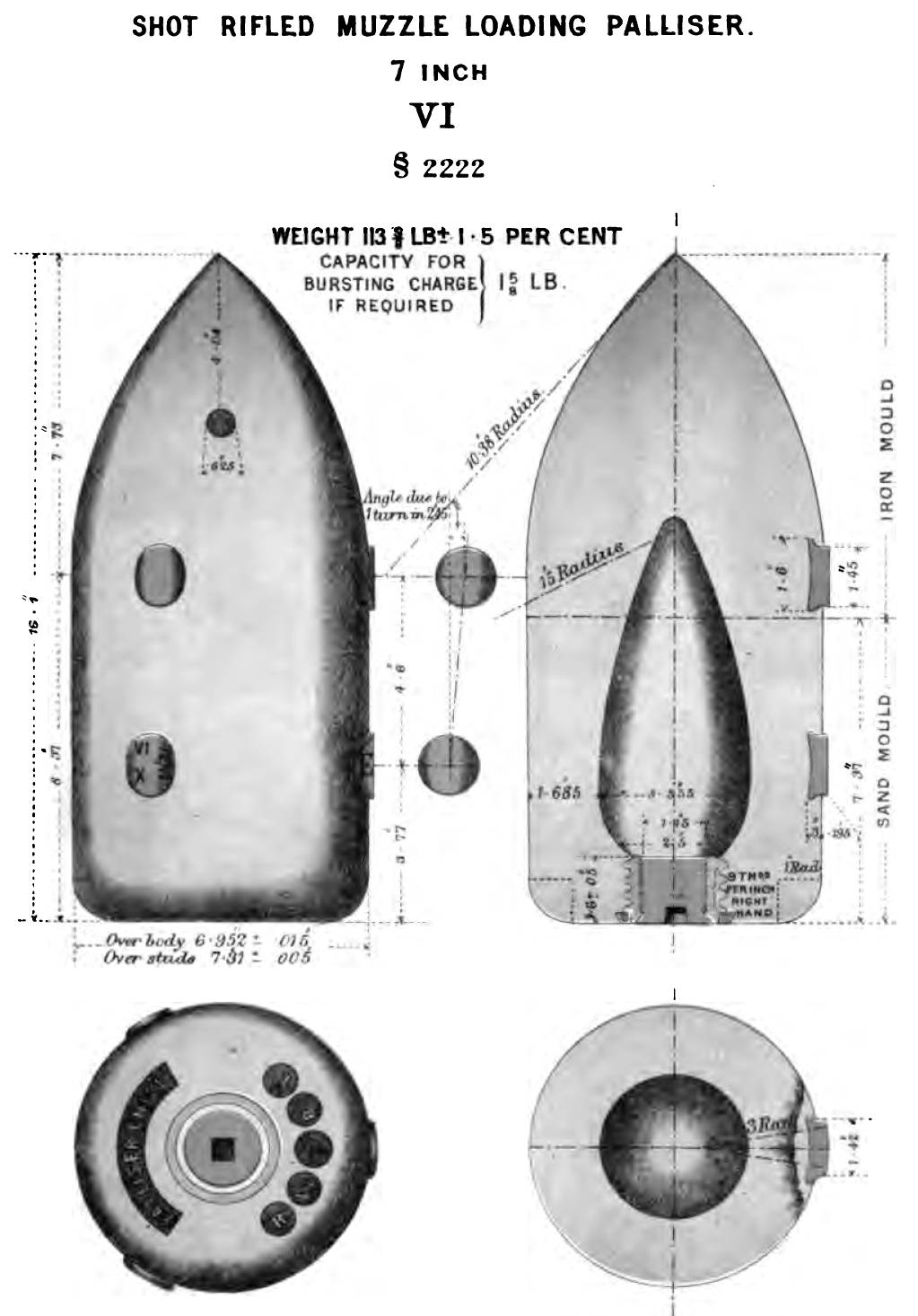
Studded Palliser shot for RML 7 inch gun, 1877

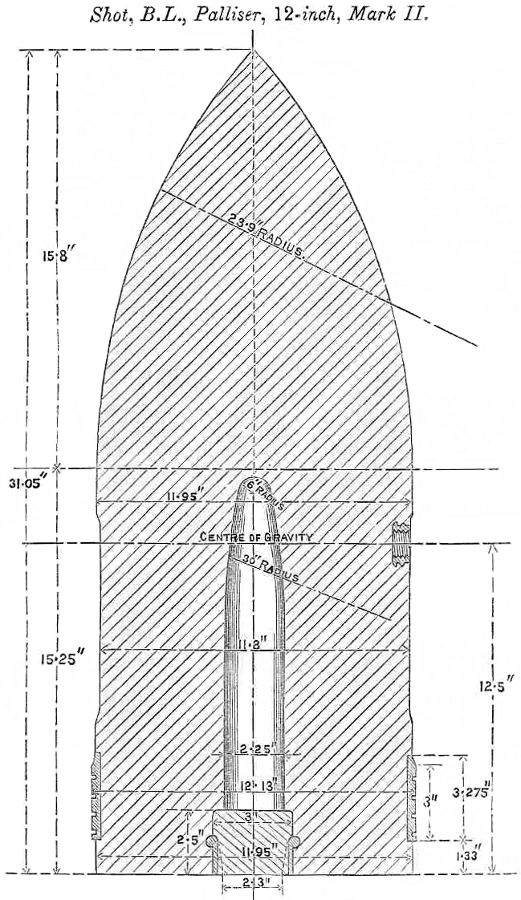
Palliser shot for BL 12 inch naval gun Mk I - VII, 1886

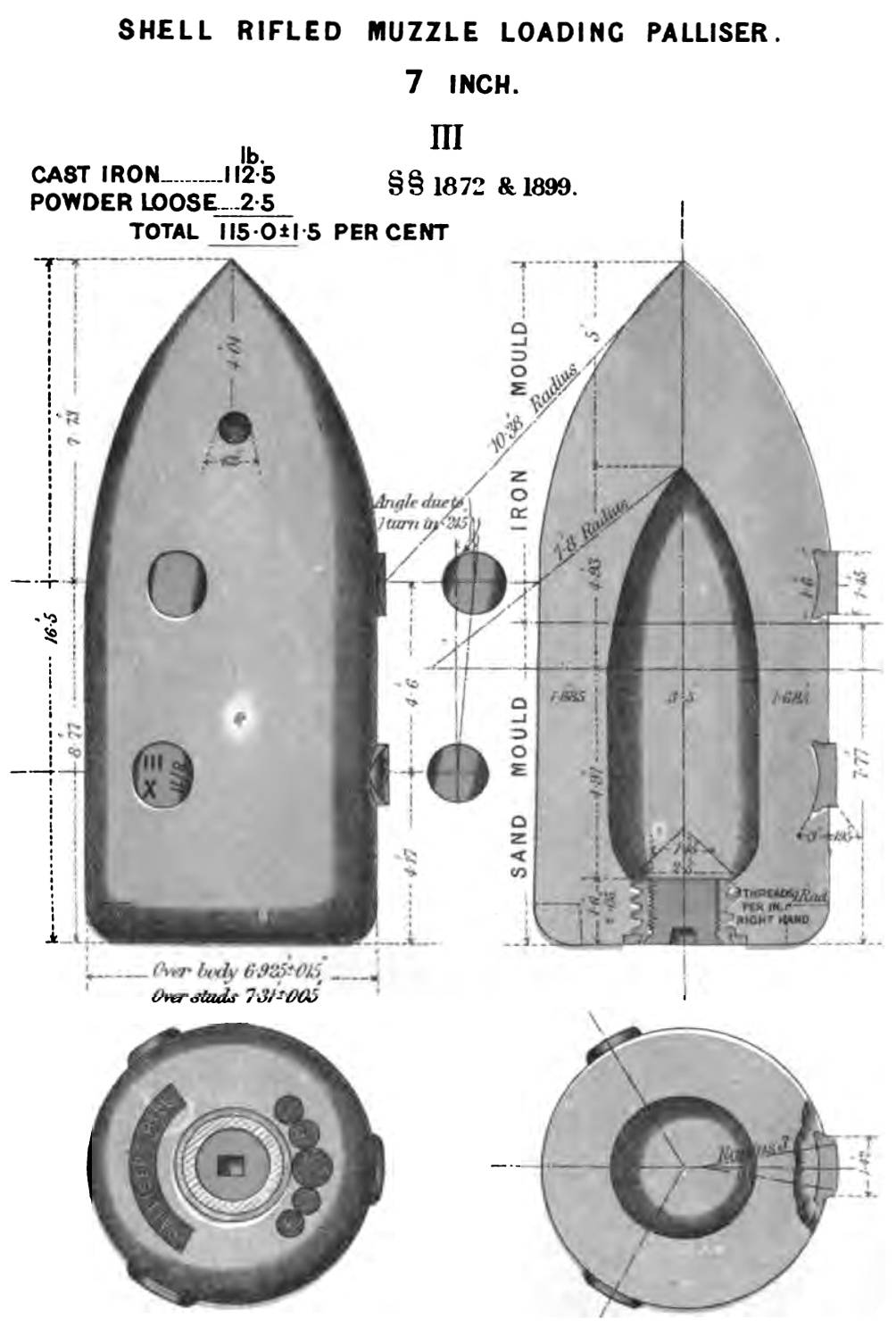
Studded Palliser shell for RML 7 inch gun, 1877

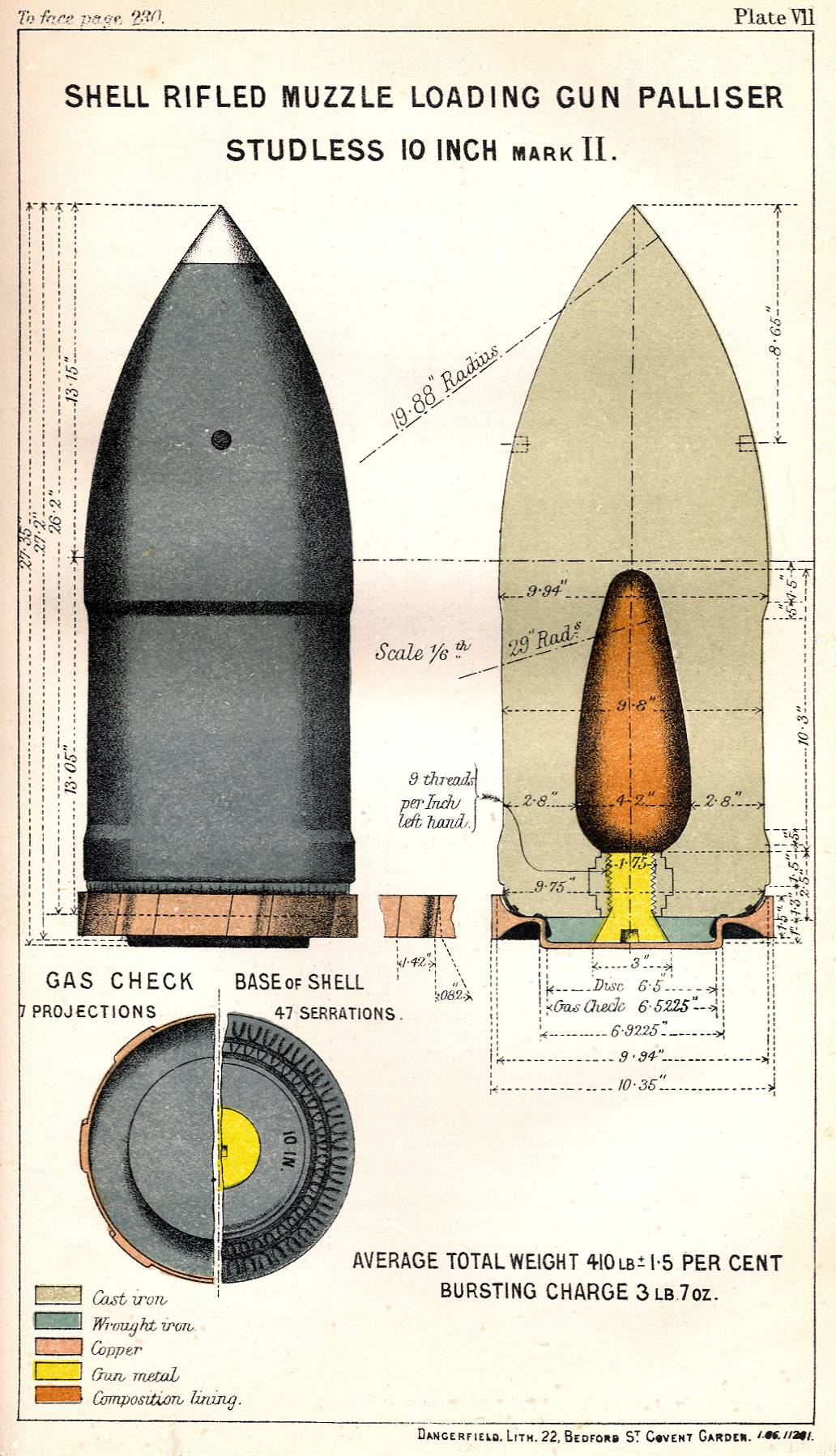
Studless Palliser shell for RML 10 inch 18 ton gun, 1886

Palliser shot was made of cast iron, the head being chilled in casting to harden it, using composite moulds with a metal, water-cooled portion for the head. At times there were defects that led to cracking in the projectiles, but these were overcome with time. Bronze studs were installed into the outside of the projectile so as to engage the rifling grooves in the gun barrel. The base had a hollow pocket but was not filled with powder or explosive: the cavity was necessitated by difficulties in casting large solid projectiles without them cracking when they cooled, because the nose and base of the projectiles cooled at different rates, and in fact a larger cavity facilitated a better-quality casting. The hole at the base was threaded to accept a copper gas check. This prevented propellant gases from blowing around the projectile, providing obturation as the driving band had yet to be perfected. Later designs did away with the studs on the projectile body, with the gas checks being set with grooves to impart spin to the projectile.

Britain also deployed Palliser shells in the 1870s–1880s. In the shell the cavity was slightly larger than in the shot and was filled with gunpowder instead of being empty, to provide a small explosive effect after penetrating armour plating. The shell was correspondingly slightly longer than the shot to compensate for the lighter cavity. The powder filling was ignited by the shock of impact and hence did not require a fuze. While these Palliser shells were effective against unhardened iron, British doctrine held that only shot (i.e. non-explosive projectiles) were suitable for penetrating the new hardened armour being developed in the 1880s; hence the gunpowder filling was discontinued.

== Bibliography ==
- "Treatise on Ammunition" 2nd Edition, 1877. War Office, UK
- "Treatise on Ammunition" 4th Edition, 1887. War Office, UK
