= Richard Young =

Richard Young may refer to:

== Arts and entertainment ==
- Richard Young (cinematographer) (1939–2010), American cinematographer
- Richard Young (photographer) (born 1947), English society and celebrity photographer
- Richard Young (actor) (born 1955), American film and television actor
- Richard Young (born 1955), member of the Kentucky Headhunters

== Politics ==
- Sir Richard Young, 1st Baronet (c. 1580–1651), English politician
- Richard Young (New York congressman) (1846–1935), House Representative for New York state
- Richard D. Young (1942–2025), state senator for Indiana
- Richard M. Young (1798–1861), senator from Illinois
- Richard Young (MP) (1809–1871), British Liberal politician

== Religion ==
- Richard Young (bishop of Rochester) (died 1418), 15th-century bishop
- Richard Younge or Young (fl. 1640–1670), Calvinist tract writer
- Richard Young (bishop of Athabasca) (1843–1905), Canadian bishop

== Sports ==
- Ricky Ortiz (born 1975), professional wrestler born Richard Young
- Richard Young (footballer), English footballer
- Richard Young (cricketer) (1845–1885), Irish cricketer

== Other people ==
- Richard W. Young (1858–1919), U.S. Army brigadier general
- Richard E. Young (born 1938), American malacologist
- Richard L. Young (born 1953), U.S. federal judge
- Richard A. Young (born 1954), American geneticist
- Richard B. Young (died 1991), professor of English at Smith College
- Richard S. Young (died 1996), American biologist
- Richard Young (activist) (1950–2023), British farming activist

== Other uses ==
- PS Richard Young, a paddle steamer built for the Great Eastern Railway

== See also ==
- Richard Youngs (born 1966), musician
- Dick Young (disambiguation)
- Rick Young (1934–2026), American bullfighter and rodeo clown
- Rickey Young (born 1953), American football player
- Ricky Young (born 1960), American boxer
