= HMS Neptune (1874) =

Ironclad turret ship acquired by Royal Navy

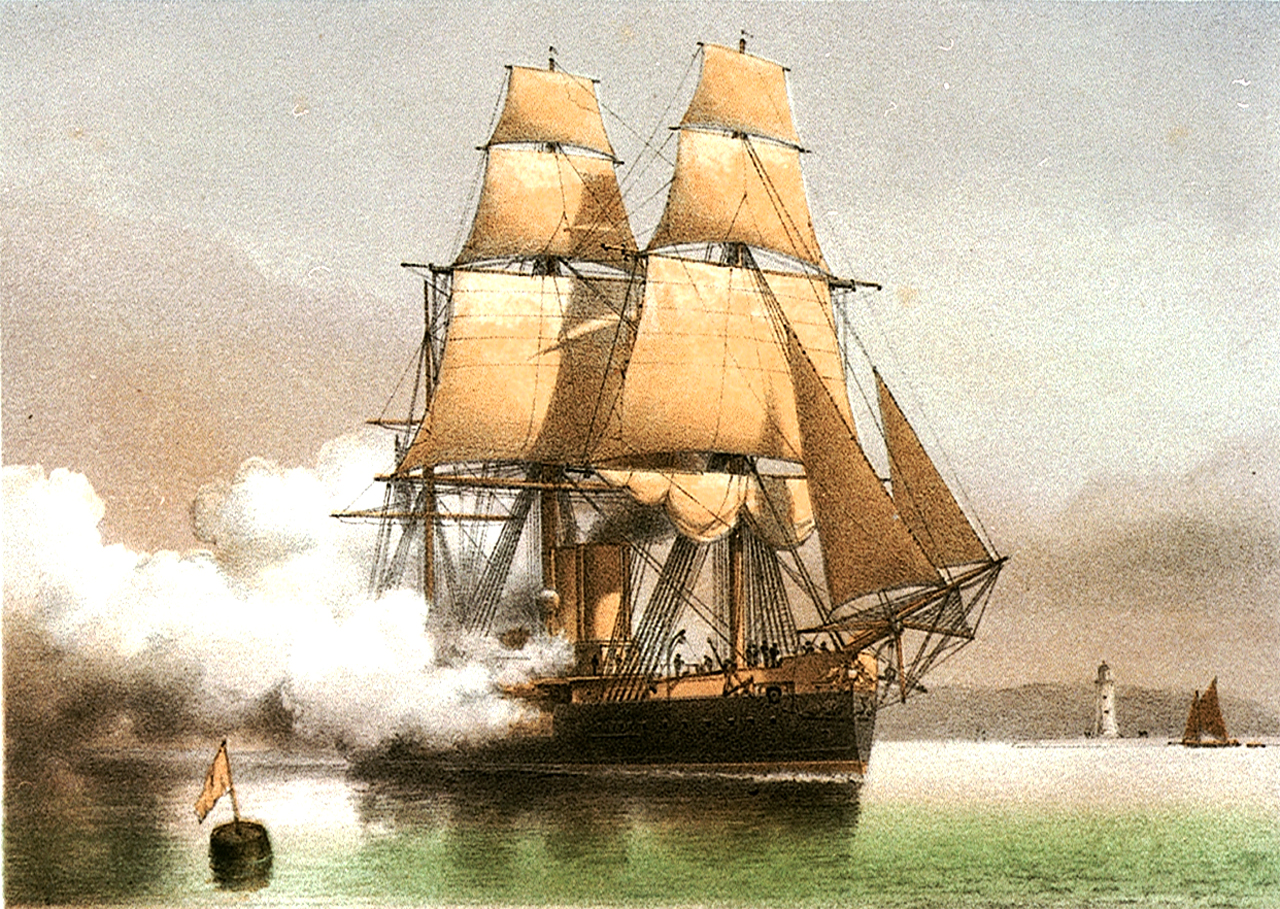

History

United Kingdom
- Name: HMS Neptune
- Namesake: Neptune
- Builder: J & W Dudgeon, Cubitt Town, London
- Cost: £600,000
- Laid down: 1873
- Launched: 10 September 1874
- Completed: 3 September 1881
- Acquired: February–March 1878
- Commissioned: 28 March 1883
- Fate: Sold for scrap 15 September 1903

General characteristics
- Type: Ironclad turret ship
- Displacement: 8,964 long tons (9,108 t)
- Length: 300 ft (91.4 m) (p/p)
- Beam: 63 ft (19.2 m)
- Draught: 25 ft (7.6 m)
- Installed power: 8,832 ihp (6,586 kW)
- Propulsion: 1 shaft, 1 2-cylinder Trunk steam engine, 8 rectangular boilers
- Sail plan: Barque-rigged
- Speed: 14 knots (26 km/h; 16 mph)
- Range: 1,480 nmi (2,740 km; 1,700 mi) at 10 kn (19 km/h; 12 mph)
- Complement: 541
- Armament: 4 × 12.5-inch (317 mm) rifled muzzle-loading guns; 2 × 9-inch (229 mm) rifled muzzle-loading guns; 6 × 20-pounder breech-loading guns; 2 × 14 in (360 mm) torpedo launchers
- Armour: Belt: 9–12 in (229–305 mm); Decks: 1–3 in (25–76 mm); Citadel: 10 in (254 mm); Gun turrets: 11–13 in (279–330 mm); Conning tower: 6–8 in (152–203 mm); Bulkheads: 8 in (203 mm)

HMS Neptune was an ironclad turret ship originally designed and built in Britain for Brazil, but acquired for the Royal Navy in 1878. Modifications to suit the Royal Navy took three years to complete and the ship did not begin her first commission until 1883 with the Channel Fleet. She was transferred to the Mediterranean Fleet in 1885, but refitted in Portsmouth in 1886–87. Neptune then became the coastguard ship for the 1st Class Reserve at Holyhead until 1893 when she was placed in reserve in Portsmouth. While she was being towed to the breakers in 1903, Neptune unintentionally rammed HMS Victory, then serving as a training hulk for the Naval Signal School, collided with HMS Hero, and narrowly missed several other ships. She was scrapped in Germany in 1904.

== Design and description ==
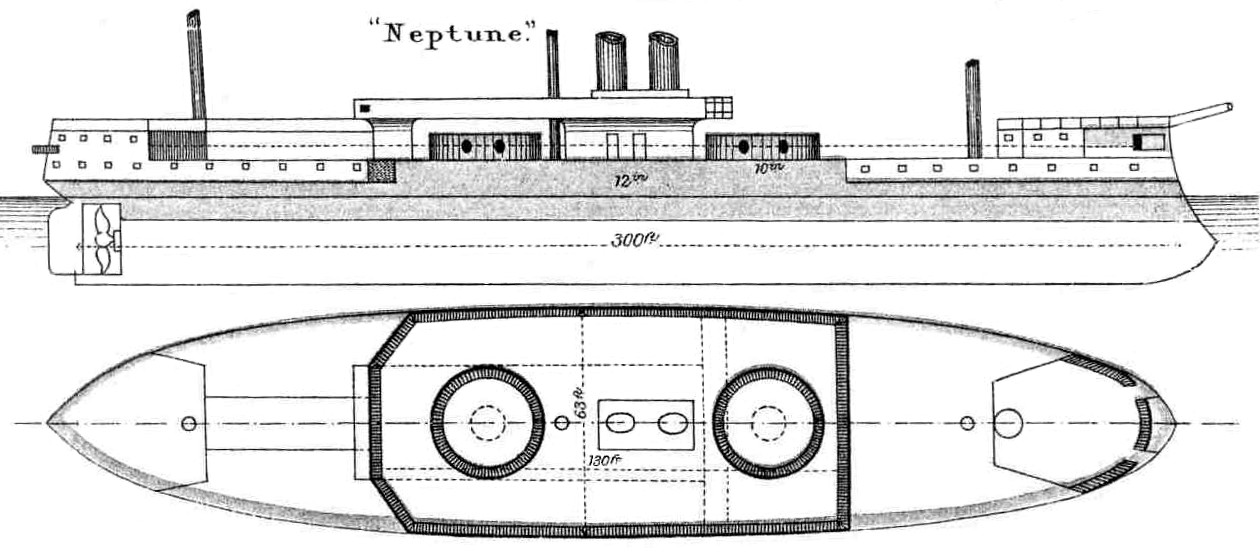
Right elevation and deck plan (with masts truncated) as depicted in Brassey's Naval Annual 1888

HMS Neptune was designed by Sir Edward Reed for the Imperial Brazilian Navy in 1872 as a masted version of HMS Devastation, a larger, sea-going version of the Cerberus-class breastwork monitors, and was given the provisional name Independencia. Adding masts, however, meant adding a forecastle at the bow and a poop deck at the stern to provide the space required for the masts and rigging. These blocked the firing arcs of the gun turrets so that they were deprived of the axial fire which was the original design's greatest virtue. The ship resembled, instead, an enlarged version of HMS Monarch.

During the Russo-Turkish War of 1877–78 tensions dramatically escalated between Russia and Great Britain as the latter feared that the victorious Russian armies would occupy the Turkish capital of Constantinople, something that the British were not prepared to tolerate. They mobilized much of the Royal Navy in case war did break out and purchased a number of ironclads under construction, including Independencia, in 1878. The Brazilians sold the ship for £600,000, nearly twice as much as the £370,000 paid for Devastation a few years earlier. Another £89,172 was spent to bring her up to the standards of the Royal Navy. In British service she was deemed "a white elephant, being a thoroughly bad ship in most respects—unlucky, full of inherent faults and small vices, and at times a danger to her own consorts".

Neptune was 300 feet (91.4 m) long between perpendiculars. She had a beam of 63 feet (19.2 m) and a draft of 25 feet (7.6 m). The ship normally displaced 8,964 long tons (9,108 t) and 9,311 long tons (9,460 t) at deep load.

Neptune proved a poor seakeeper as she was wet, difficult to manoeuvre and a heavy roller. She had a 12-foot (3.7 m) skylight over the wardroom, which as a result often flooded while the ship was at sea.

=== Propulsion ===
Neptune had one 2-cylinder trunk steam engine, made by John Penn and Sons, driving a single 26-foot (7.9 m) propeller. Eight rectangular boilers provided steam to the engine at a working pressure of 32 psi (221 kPa; 2 kgf/cm^{2}). The engine had a total designed output of 8,000 indicated horsepower (6,000 kW), but produced a total of 8,832 ihp (6,586 kW) during sea trials in February 1878 which gave Neptune a maximum speed of 14.65 knots (27.13 km/h; 16.86 mph). The ship carried 670 long tons (680 t) of coal, enough to steam 1,480 nmi (2,740 km; 1,700 mi) at 10 knots (19 km/h; 12 mph) even though Sir George Tryon described her as "a weak ship in her engines and consuming a coal-mine daily".

Neptune was barque-rigged, but her twin funnels were so close to the mainmast that the sails and rigging rapidly deteriorated in service. The mast was eventually stripped of sails and yards so that the ship only used the fore and mizzen masts; an unsightly combination described as "like a half-dressed harlot". During her 1886 refit the ship's masts and rigging were replaced by simple pole masts with fighting tops at the fore and mizzen positions only.

=== Armament ===
The Brazilians had ordered four Whitworth 12-inch (305 mm) for the gun turrets and a pair of 8-inch (203 mm) breech-loading guns as chase guns, but these were replaced in British service. HMS Neptune mounted a pair of 12.5-inch (317 mm) muzzle-loading rifles in each turret and two 9-inch (229 mm) rifled muzzle-loading guns in the forecastle as chase guns. These guns only traverse 45° to the side. The ship also had six 20-pounder Armstrong guns for use as saluting guns. Two 14-inch (356 mm) torpedo tubes were mounted on the main deck, one on each side, for Whitehead torpedoes.

The shell of the 16-calibre 12.5-inch gun weighed 809 pounds (367.0 kg) while the gun itself weighed 38 long tons (39 t). It had a muzzle velocity of 1,575 ft/s (480 m/s) and was credited with the ability to penetrate a nominal 18.4 inches (467 mm) of wrought iron armour at the muzzle. The 14-calibre 9-inch gun weighed 12 long tons (12 t) and fired a 254-pound (115.2 kg) shell at a muzzle velocity of 1,420 ft/s (430 m/s). It was credited with the nominal ability to penetrate 11.3-inch (287 mm) armour. The muzzle blast of the main guns was more than the deck immediately below the muzzles could stand and the full charge for the guns was reduced from 200 to 180 pounds (90.7 to 81.6 kg) of powder to minimize the damage.

=== Armour ===
Neptune had a complete waterline belt of wrought iron that was 12 inches (305 mm) thick amidships and thinned to 10 inches (254 mm) and then to 9 inches (229 mm) in steps at the ends of the ship. The armour extended 5 feet 6 inches (1.7 m) above the waterline and 3 feet (0.9 m) below it. An armoured citadel 112 feet (34.1 m) long protected the bases of the gun turrets, the funnel uptakes and the ventilation shafts for the engines and boilers. The sides of the citadel were 10 inches thick and it was closed off by transverse bulkheads 8 inches (203 mm) thick. The chase guns at the bow were protected by a patch of 6-inch (152 mm) armour.

The faces of the turrets were 13 inches (330 mm) thick while the sides were 11 inches (279 mm) thick. They were backed by 13–15 inches (330–381 mm) of teak. The armoured deck was 2–3 inches (51–76 mm) outside the citadel and 2 inches thick inside it. Neptune was provided with a conning tower protected by 6–8 inches of armour situated right in front of the foremast. It could "be regarded as the first adequately installed conning position installed in a British" ironclad.

== Service ==
HMS Neptune was laid down in 1873 for the Brazilian Navy under the name of Independencia by J & W Dudgeon in Cubitt Town, London. The shipyard attempted to launch her on 16 July 1874, but she stuck fast and did not budge. A second attempt was made on 30 July during which the ship got about one-third down the slipway and stuck, extensively damaging her bottom plating. She was finally launched on 10 September, after she had been lightened, and she was towed to Samuda Brothers for repairs and fitting out. The cost of the accident resulted in the bankruptcy of Dudgeons in 1875.

Independencia ran her sea trials in December 1877. On 22 December, she ran aground in the River Thames at Greenwich, Kent. She was refloated on 25 December and towed in to Greenhithe, Kent. Independencia was run into by the British steamship Firebrick at Greenhithe, Kent on 23 February 1878 and sustained slight damage. She was purchased by the Royal Navy in March 1878 and renamed Neptune, after the Roman god of the sea. She was then taken to Portsmouth for alterations to her armament and other equipment that took until 3 September 1881 to complete.

Neptune was commissioned on 28 March 1883 for service with the Channel Fleet. She was transferred to the Mediterranean Fleet in 1885, but returned to Portsmouth in July 1886 for a refit. The ship was assigned as the guard ship for the 1st Class Reserve at Holyhead in May 1887. Neptune paid off into reserve in November 1893 in Portsmouth. In April 1902 she was transferred from Fleet reserve to Dockyard Reserve. The ship was sold for £18,000 on 15 September 1903 for scrap.

While under tow by the tug Rowland and another at her side out of Portsmouth on 23 October 1903, Neptune broke the cables connecting her to the tugs in a storm. With the winds and a strong flood tide pushing her, she was pushed back into the harbour and narrowly missed the training tender of the Royal Naval College, Osborne, HMS Racer. Neptune struck the training brig Sunflower anchored beside Racer a glancing blow and then hit the port side of HMS Victory, making a hole at her orlop deck. Neptune then was pushed by the tides and winds toward HMS Hero and came to rest against the bow ram of Hero. She was finally broken up in Lemwerder, Germany, in 1904.
