= HMS Abyssinia =

Breastwork monitor

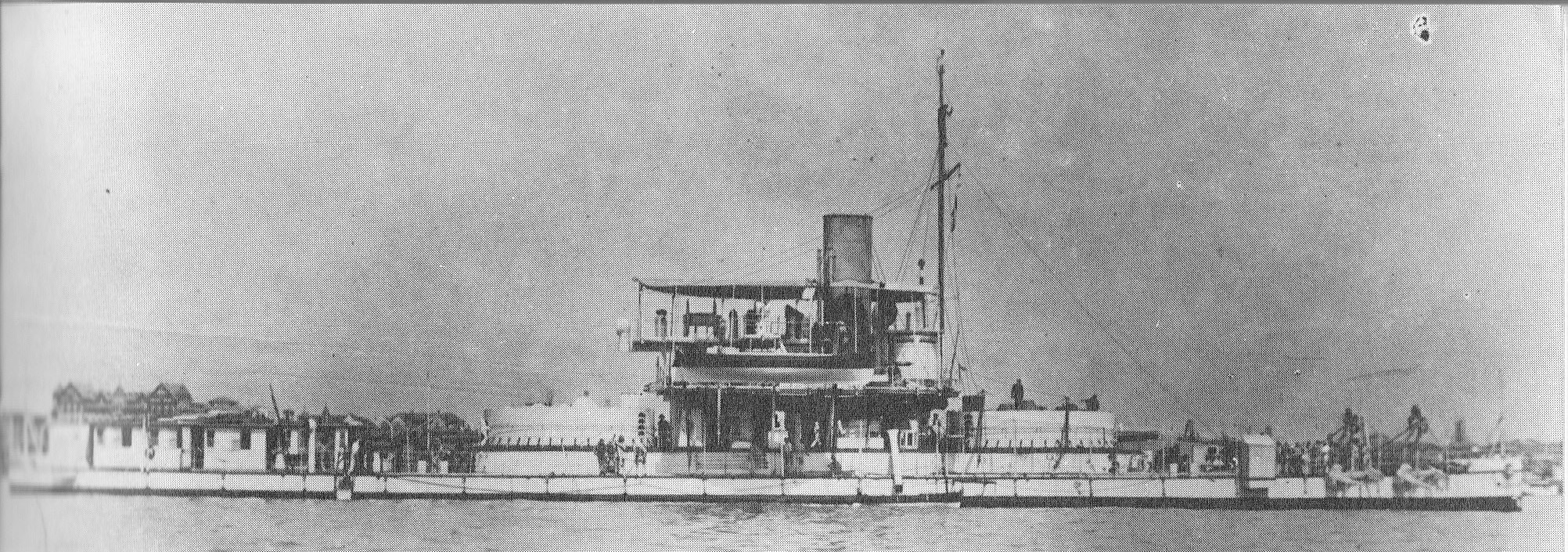
- Abyssinia circa. 1895

History

Bombay Marine
- Name: Abyssinia
- Namesake: Abyssinia
- Builder: J & W Dudgeon, Cubitt Town, London
- Laid down: 23 July 1868
- Launched: 19 February 1870
- Completed: October 1870
- Fate: Broken up, 1903

General characteristics
- Class & type: Modified Cerberus-class monitor
- Displacement: 2,901 tons
- Tons burthen: 1854 bm
- Length: 225 ft (69 m) pp
- Beam: 42 ft (13 m)
- Draught: 14 ft 7 in (4.45 m)
- Installed power: 1,200 ihp (890 kW)
- Propulsion: 2 × 2-cylinder diagonal single-expansion steam engines by Dudgeon; 2 screws
- Speed: 9.59 knots (18 km/h)
- Complement: 100
- Armament: From 1870: 4 × 10-inch (254 mm) rifled muzzle-loading guns; From 1892: 4 × BL 8-inch (203.2 mm) Mk VI guns
- Armour: Belt 7 inches (18 cm) amidships, 6 inches (15 cm) fore and aft; Breastwork 7–8 inches (18–20 cm) inches; Turrets 10 inches (25 cm) faces, 8 inches (20 cm) sides; Deck 1.5 inches (3.8 cm); Breastwork deck 1 inch (2.5 cm)

HMS Abyssinia was a breastwork monitor ordered, designed, and built by J & W Dudgeon specifically for the Bombay Marine for the defense of the harbor at Bombay.

Designed by Sir Edward Reed, she was a smaller version of, and thus a half-sister to, the Cerberus-class monitors Cerberus and Magdala. It was intended that Abyssinia and Magdala would serve in mutual support on the same station. Given that the stipulated naval requirement was for two ships for the coastal defence of the Bombay area, the India Office was pressured by the Board of Admiralty and the Chief Constructor to order two ships of the Cerberus class. After the order for Magdala was placed, budgetary limitations dictated that a smaller, cheaper vessel had to be acquired.

Abyssinia, while similar in layout to Magdala, was smaller and cost £20,000 less. She had slightly less freeboard, a shorter breastwork, could carry less coal, and had about one knot less speed.

The ferry trip to her base in Bombay was made under her own power, without the use of any sails. Unlike her half-sisters, her hull was not built up for the trip, which she made in a faster time than they did.

== Service history ==
Abyssinia remained at anchor in Bombay harbor, only occasionally venturing out for brief firing practice, for the duration of her service career. When the Indian Harbour Defence Service was discontinued in 1903, she was sold locally and broken up.
