= List of shipwrecks in August 1875 =

The list of shipwrecks in August 1875 includes ships sunk, foundered, grounded, or otherwise lost during August 1875.

== 1 August ==
List of shipwrecks: 1 August 1875
Ship	State	Description
Skandivar	Norway	The ship collided with a steamship and was abandoned in the English Channel off the Channel Islands. An attempt by the schooner yacht Marcia ( (United Kingdom of Great Britain and Ireland) Guernsey) to tow her into Guernsey had to be abandoned on 3 August when Skandivar capsized.

== 2 August ==
List of shipwrecks: 2 August 1875
Ship	State	Description
Carlo M.	Italy	The barque was driven ashore and wrecked at Lagos, Portugal. Her crew were rescued.
George IV	United Kingdom	The ship was driven ashore at Fraserburgh, Aberdeenshire. She was on a voyage from Runcorn, Cheshire to Rosehearty, Aberdeenshire. She was refloated and taken in to Fraserburgh in a leaky condition.
Savannah	United Kingdom	The barque ran aground on the Shipwash Sand, in the North Sea off the coast of Suffolk. She was on a voyage from South Shields, County Durham to Cartagena, Spain. She was refloated and resumed her voyage.

== 3 August ==
List of shipwrecks: 3 August 1875
Ship	State	Description
Alexandre Delphine	Germany	The barque was wrecked at "Cape Mayne". She was on a voyage from Saint Thomas to "Cape Mayne".
Concordia	United Kingdom	The brigantine was driven ashore at the mouth of the River Tees. Her crew were rescued.
Emily	United Kingdom	The schooner foundered off the mouth of the Scheldt. Her crew survived. She was on a voyage from Dordrecht, South Holland, Netherlands to Middlesbrough, Yorkshire.
HMS Favorite	Royal Navy	The ironclad ran aground on the Scroby Sands, Norfolk. She was refloated.
Oriana	United Kingdom	The steamship was damaged by fire at Liverpool, Lancashire.
Windward	United Kingdom	The yawl was driven ashore in "Loch Eynard". Her crew were rescued. She was on a voyage from South Uist, Outer Hebrides to Glasgow, Renfrewshire.

== 4 August ==
List of shipwrecks: 4 August 1875
Ship	State	Description
Emily	United Kingdom	The schooner foundered off Schouwen, Zeeland, Netherlands. Her crew were rescued by a pilot cutter. She was on a voyage from Dordrecht, South Holland, Netherlands to Middlesbrough, Yorkshire.
Hellechina Amalia	Netherlands	The schooner collided with the steamship Vanguard (United Kingdom) and sank in the North Sea off the Swin Middle Lightship ( Trinity House). Hellechina Amalia was on a voyage from Saint Petersburg, Russia to London, United Kingdom.
Yembo	United Kingdom	The steamship ran aground off Ouessant, Finistère, France and was wrecked. Her crew were rescued. She was on a voyage from Sunderland, County Durham to Savona, Italy.

== 5 August ==
List of shipwrecks: 5 August 1875
Ship	State	Description
Kolga	Sweden	The steamship sprang a leak and was beached at Riga, Russia. She was on a voyage from Riga to Liepāja, Russia.
Lydia	Canada	The ship ran aground at Dragør, Denmark. She was refloated.
Marie Elizabeth	France	The barque was wrecked at Sainte-Marie, Martinique. Her crew were rescued.
Selim	United Kingdom	The barque ran aground on the Orton Bank. She was on a voyage from Hong Kong to Yloilo, Spanish East Indies. She was refloated.

== 6 August ==
List of shipwrecks: 6 August 1875
Ship	State	Description
Alert	United Kingdom	The yacht ran aground on The Shingles. She was refloated and taken in to Great Yarmouth, Norfolk.
Enrica	Italy	The barque collided with the full-rigged ship Samuel Plimsoll (United Kingdom) and sank 20 nautical miles (37 km) west of The Lizard, Cornwall, United Kingdom with the loss of three lives. Survivors were rescued by the pilot cutter No. 6 (United Kingdom). Enrica was on a voyage from Mazagan, Morocco to Falmouth, Cornwall.
Evangeline	United Kingdom	The barque was destroyed by fire at Buenos Aires, Argentina.
Harry	United Kingdom	The Thames barge sank in Bugsby's Reach, River Thames.
Lochinvar	Canada	The ship was wrecked on the Rocas Atoll. Her crew were rescued. She was on a voyage from New York, United States to Pernambuco, Brazil.
Twee Gezusters	Netherlands	The galiot foundered off Bornholm, Denmark. Her crew were rescued. She was on a voyage from Stockholm, Sweden to Rotterdam, South Holland.

== 7 August ==
List of shipwrecks: 7 August 1875
Ship	State	Description
Albatross	United Kingdom	The barque foundered in the Indian Ocean. Her crew were rescued. She was on a voyage from Moulmein, Burma to Falmouth, Cornwall.
Alcatraz	United Kingdom	The ship departed from San Francisco, California for Queenstown, County Cork. No further trace, presumed foundered with the loss of all hands.
Duke of Devonshire	United Kingdom	The steamship arrived at London from Calcutta, India on fire. The fire was extinguished with the assistance of two fireboats.
Neva	France	The steamship ran aground and was wrecked 8 nautical miles (15 km) from Batavia, Netherlands East Indies. All on board were rescued.
Wideawake	(Ottoman Empire) Hejaz Vilayet	The full-rigged ship foundered off the Malabar Coast of India with some loss of life. Survivors were rescued by the steamship Africa (United Kingdom). Wideawake was on a voyage from Jeddah to Calcutta, India.

== 8 August ==
List of shipwrecks: 8 August 1875
Ship	State	Description
Globe	United Kingdom	The brig was driven ashore and wrecked at Whitby, Yorkshire. Her crew survived. She was on a voyage from Blyth, Northumberland to Sheerness, Kent.
Rosa	Norway	The barque struck a sunken rock and was beached near Mandal.
Windermere	United Kingdom	The steamship was driven ashore on Lundy Island, Devon. She was on a voyage from Cardiff, Glamorgan to Cádiz, Spain. She was refloated and put back to Cardiff.
Zealous	United Kingdom	The paddle steamer ran aground at Harwich, Essex. She was refloated.

== 9 August ==
List of shipwrecks: 9 August 1875
Ship	State	Description
Aurelie	United States	The ship was destroyed by fire at sea. Her crew took to the boats; they were rescued on 14 August by Moonlight (United Kingdom) Aurelie was on a voyage from Barbados to the River Plate.
Aurora	United Kingdom	The ship caught fire in the Atlantic Ocean and was abandoned by her crew. She was on a voyage from Adelaide, South Australia to London.
Avance	Norway	The ship ran aground on the Cross Sand, in the North Sea off the coast of Norfolk, United Kingdom and was abandoned by her crew. She was on a voyage from Risør to London She was refloated and assisted in to Great Yarmouth, Norfolk in a severely leaky condition.
Avenir	United Kingdom	The ship was driven ashore at the mouth of the Larne Lough.
Cairngorm	United Kingdom	The ship was driven ashore and wrecked at Whitburn, County Durham. She was on a voyage from Sunderland, County Durham to Invergordon, Ross-shire. She was refloated on 20 August.
Dee	United Kingdom	The steamship was driven ashore at Hummersea, Yorkshire. She was on a voyage from Kirkcaldy, Fife to London. She was refloated on 11 August and towed in to Whitby, Yorkshire.
Farnley Hall	United Kingdom	The steamship was driven ashore at Wismar, Germany. She was on a voyage from Hartlepool, County Durham to Wismar.
Garda	United Kingdom	The ship was driven ashore at Kingsdown, Kent. She was refloated.
James Groves	United Kingdom	The steamship ran aground in the Sea of Azov. She was refloated.
Lady Gray	United Kingdom	The brig was driven ashore and wrecked at Souter Point, County Durham. She was on a voyage from Aberdeen to Sunderland, County Durham.
Zelina	United Kingdom	The schooner was driven ashore at Kingsdown. She was refloated.

== 10 August ==
List of shipwrecks: 10 August 1875
Ship	State	Description
Guatamala Packet	United Kingdom	The ship departed from Liverpool, Lancashire for Jamaica. No further trace, reported missing.
Thilda	Norway	The barque ran aground. She was on a voyage from Norrbotten to Dunkirk, Nord, France. She was refloated and taken in to Copenhagen, Denmark.
Thracian	United Kingdom	The barque ran aground at Moulmein, Burma. She was on a voyage from Singapore, Straits Settlements to Moulmein. She was refloated on 14 August and towed in to Moulmein, where she was declared beyond economic repair.

== 11 August ==
List of shipwrecks: 11 August 1875
Ship	State	Description
Algerian	United Kingdom	The steamship ran aground in the Saint Lawrence River. Her 300 passengers were taken off.
Alonso	Flag unknown	The steamship ran aground off "Otkachoff". She was refloated.
Collier	United Kingdom	The steamship ran aground at Pill, Somerset and sank. She was on a voyage from Plymouth, Devon to Cardiff, Glamorgan.
Comete	France	The barque was destroyed by fire in the Bangka Strait. Her crew were rescued by the steamship Nova (United Kingdom). Comete was on a voyage from Singapore, Straits Settlements to Marseille, Bouches-du-Rhône.
Jane Innes	United Kingdom	The schooner sprang a leak and foundered off Southwold, Suffolk. Her crew survived. She was on a voyage from the River Tyne to Boulogne, Pas-de-Calais, France.
Lotus	United Kingdom	The fishing smack ran aground on the Barber Sand, in the North Sea off the coast of Norfolk. She was refloated and taken in to Great Yarmouth, Norfolk.
Rover	United Kingdom	The steamship was driven ashore on Skagen, Denmark. She was refloated and resumed her voyage.

== 12 August ==
List of shipwrecks: 12 August 1875
Ship	State	Description
China	United Kingdom	The ship ran aground on a reef in the Red Sea off "Cape Elba". She was on a voyage from Calcutta, India to Trieste. She was refloated the next day and put in to Port Said, Egypt for repairs.
George Henry	United Kingdom	The schooner was driven ashore on Vlieland, Friesland, Netherlands. She was on a voyage from Port Madoc, Caernarfonshire to Hamburg, Germany. She was refloated the next day.
Importer	United Kingdom	The ship departed from Dundee, Forfarshire for Mobile, Alabama, United States. No further trace, presumed foundered with the loss of all hands.
Justicia	United Kingdom	The steamship ran aground off Cabo da Roca, Spain. She was on a voyage from Newcastle upon Tyne, Northumberland to Malta. She was refloated and resumed her voyage, but later ran aground on the Soretto Rocks. She was refloated and arrived at Malta on 19 August.

== 13 August ==
List of shipwrecks: 13 August 1875
Ship	State	Description
Boyne	United Kingdom	The steamship was wrecked off the Île Molène, Finistère, France with the loss of two of the 221 people on board. She was on a voyage from Lisbon, Portugal to Southampton, Hampshire.
S. M. C.	United Kingdom	The schooner collided with the tug Flying Squall (United Kingdom) and sank off Great Cumbrae, Argyllshire with the loss of three of the six people on board. S. M. C. was on a voyage from Glasgow, Renfrewshire to Southampton, Hampshire.

== 14 August ==
List of shipwrecks: 14 August 1875
Ship	State	Description
Bella Donna	United Kingdom	The schooner yacht ran aground off Ryde, Isle of Wight. She was refloated.
Notre Dame de la Garde	France	The barque ran aground on the Goodwin Sands, Kent, United Kingdom. She was refloated and taken in to The Downs.

== 15 August ==
List of shipwrecks: 15 August 1875
Ship	State	Description
Cherokee	United Kingdom	The ship was driven ashore and wrecked in the Magdalen Islands, Nova Scotia, Canada. Her crew were rescued. She was on a voyage from London to Montreal, Quebec, Canada.

== 16 August ==
List of shipwrecks: 16 August 1875
Ship	State	Description
Iona	United Kingdom	The fishing vessel collided with a steamship and sank off Rattray Head, Aberdeenshire. Her crew were rescued.
Palestine	United Kingdom	The steamship ran aground at the Calf of Man, Isle of Man. She was on a voyage from Liverpool, Lancashire to Montreal, Quebec, Canada. She was refloated and taken in to Belfast, County Antrim sinking at the bow.
Unnamed	Flag unknown	The brigantine ran aground on the West Hoyle Bank, in Liverpool Bay.

== 17 August ==
List of shipwrecks: 17 August 1875
Ship	State	Description
Express	Spain	The steamship exploded at Barcelona with the loss of seventeen lives. The wreck sank on 20 August with the loss of five more lives.
Milan	United States	The ship was destroyed by fire in Mission Bay. She was on a voyage from San Francisco, California to Yokohama, Japan.

== 18 August ==
List of shipwrecks: 18 August 1875
Ship	State	Description
Mistletoe	United Kingdom	The schooner sank with the loss of three lives after colliding with the royal yacht HMY Alberta (Royal Navy) in the Solent. Alberta rescued Mistletoe's survivors. She was refloated on 24 August and towed in to Portsmouth, Hampshire.

== 19 August ==
List of shipwrecks: 19 August 1875
Ship	State	Description
City of Serangitapam	United Kingdom	The ship was sighted in the South Atlantic whilst on a voyage from Calcutta, India to London. No further trace, presumed foundered with the loss of all hands.
Hattie M. Lyons	United States	The fishing Schooner was lost on Cape Hogan. Crew saved.
Nornen	Norway	The barque departed from New York, United States for Queenstown, County Cork, United Kingdom. No further trace, presumed foundered with the loss of all twelve crew.
Ville de Cardiff	France	The schooner foundered in the Bay of Biscay off 66 nautical miles (122 km) off Belle Île, Morbihan. Her crew were rescued. She was on a voyage from Marennes, Charente-Inférieure to Boulogne, Pas-de-Calais.

== 20 August ==
List of shipwrecks: 20 August 1875
Ship	State	Description
Albion	(United Kingdom of Great Britain and Ireland) Guernsey	The ship collided with the steamship Greece (United Kingdom) in the English Channel off Dungeness, Kent and was severely damaged. She put in to Dover, Kent in a severely leaky condition.
Claudia	United Kingdom	The schooner ran aground on the Plough Rock, in the Belfast Lough. She was on a voyage from Ardrossan, Ayrshire to Drogheda, County Louth. She was later refloated.
Far West	United Kingdom	The barque was driven ashore at Robinson's Point, Jamaica. She was on a voyage from Belize City, British Honduras to London.
Johannes	Denmark	The schooner ran aground at Cuxhaven, Germany.
Laurens Coster	Netherlands	The full-rigged ship ran aground on the Ridge Sand. She was on a voyage from South Shields, County Durham, United Kingdom to Surabaya, Netherlands East Indies. She was refloated with the assistance of smacks and a tug and towed in to The Downs. Subsequently towed in to Vlissingen, Zeeland, where she arrived on 22 August.
Mary Kellow	United Kingdom	The schooner ran aground at Cuxhaven.
Selina	Sweden	The barque was run down and sunk off the Trindelen Rock. Her crew were rescued. She was on a voyage from Leith, Lothian, United Kingdom to Copenhagen, Denmark.
St. Aubin	United Kingdom	The steamship was driven ashore at Zéralda, Algeria. She was on a voyage from Cardiff, Glamorgan to Malta. She was refloated and completed her voyage, arriving at Malta on 24 August.
Strata Florida	United Kingdom	The ship was wrecked in the Krishna River. Her crew were rescued. She was on a voyage from Rangoon, Burma to Cochin, India.
Trevelyan Family	United Kingdom	The ship ran aground in the Min River. She was on a voyage from Fuzhou, China to Dunedin, New Zealand. She was refloated and taken in to Fuzhou for repairs.

== 21 August ==
List of shipwrecks: 21 August 1875
Ship	State	Description
Allan	United Kingdom	The ship was driven ashore in Nigg Bay and broke her back. She was on a voyage from the Cromarty Firth to Hartlepool, County Durham.
Contest	United Kingdom	The ship was driven ashore at Coney Island, County Down. Her crew survived.
General Wolseley	United Kingdom	The ship was wrecked on Brier Island, Nova Scotia, Canada. She was on a voyage from Liverpool, Lancashire to Saint John, New Brunswick, Canada.
Sabra Moses	United States	The ship was wrecked at Barrington Head, Nova Scotia. She was on a voyage from Gloucester, Massachusetts to Cape Breton Island, Nova Scotia.

== 22 August ==
List of shipwrecks: 22 August 1875
Ship	State	Description
Ecuador	United Kingdom	The steamship was driven ashore on Brier Island, Nova Scotia, Canada. She was on a voyage from Liverpool, Lancashire to Saint John, New Brunswick, Canada. She was refloated with the assistance of a tug and taken in to Saint John, where she arrived on 24 September.
Jones	United Kingdom	The brigantine sprang a leak and foundered off the Outer Dowsing Sandbank, in the North Sea off the coast of Norfolk. Her crew were rescued by Blanche (United Kingdom). Jones was on a voyage from South Shields, County Durham to Rochester, Kent.

== 23 August ==
List of shipwrecks: 23 August 1875
Ship	State	Description
Italo	Italy	The brig was wrecked on the Isla de Aves, Nicaragua. She was on a voyage from Málaga, Spain to Curaçao, Curaçao and Dependencies.

== 24 August ==
List of shipwrecks: 24 August 1875
Ship	State	Description
Fair Rosa, or Fair Rover	United Kingdom	The barque departed from an American port for Newry, County Antrim. No further trace, presumed foundered with the loss of all eleven crew.
Nancy	United Kingdom	The smack was driven ashore and wrecked near Campbeltown, Argyllshire. She was on a voyage from Ardrossan, Ayrshire to Campbeltown.
Nexa	United Kingdom	The schooner caught fire off Islay and was severely damaged.
Principio	Italy	The barque ran aground at Queenstown, County Cork, United Kingdom whilst avoiding a collision with a schooner. She was on a voyage from Queenstown to Cork. She was refloated.

== 25 August ==
List of shipwrecks: 25 August 1875
Ship	State	Description
Gloria	United Kingdom	The ship struck a submerged object in the Isles of Scilly and was holed.

== 26 August ==
List of shipwrecks: 26 August 1875
Ship	State	Description
Comet	United States	The W. M. Hanna and George W. Chapin (Cleveland, Ohio)-owned commercial wooden propeller ship collided with Manitoba (Flag unknown) at Whitefish Bay of Lake Superior and sank. Ten lives were lost.
Nieuwendam	Netherlands	The ship departed from Martinique for Havre de Grâce, Seine-Inférieure, France. No further trace, presumed foundered with the loss of all hands.
Venus	United Kingdom	The ship foundered east of Öland, Sweden. Her crew were rescued by a Norwegian barque. She was on a voyage from Sunderland, County Durham to Riga, Russia.

== 27 August ==
List of shipwrecks: 27 August 1875
Ship	State	Description
Albina	United States	The ship ran aground at Sandy Hook, New Jersey. She was on a voyage from New York to Rotterdam, South Holland, Netherlands. She was refloated the next day with the assistance of a tug.
Pegasus	United Kingdom	The schooner was abandoned in the North Sea 147 nautical miles (272 km) off the Isle of May, Fife. Her crew were rescued by the steamship Stettin (Germany). Also reported as a German steamship abandoned in the Baltic Sea 147 nautical miles (272 km) off Wismar, and a German schooner abandoned 147 nautical miles (272 km) off the Isle of May.
Phoenix	United Kingdom	The steamship was run into by the steamship Pelican (United Kingdom) and sank at Queenstown, County Cork. Her crew were rescued. Phoenix was on a voyage from Queenstown to Swansea, Glamorgan.
Vine	United Kingdom	The steamship ran aground at Dundee, Forfarshire. She was on a voyage from Riga, Russia to Dundee. She was refloated.

== 28 August ==
List of shipwrecks: 28 August 1875
Ship	State	Description
Eleanor	United Kingdom	The brigantine sprang a leak and was beached at New Brighton, Cheshire. She was on a voyage from Liverpool, Lancashire to Newcastle upon Tyne, Northumberland.
Olive Branch	United Kingdom	The barque foundered off the Butt of Lewis, Isle of Lewis, Outer Hebrides. Her crew survived. She was on a voyage from Liverpool, Lancashire to Kronstadt, Russia.

== 29 August ==
List of shipwrecks: 29 August 1875
Ship	State	Description
Anne	United Kingdom	The sloop was driven ashore at Wells-next-the-Sea, Norfolk. She was on a voyage from London to Hull, Yorkshire.

== 30 August ==
List of shipwrecks: 30 August 1875
Ship	State	Description
British Viceroy	United Kingdom	The ship collided with Adventure and Cambay (both United Kingdom) sank at Calcutta, India. Her crew were rescued. She was on a voyage from Liverpool, Lancashire to Calcutta. During an attempt to clear the wreck with explosives on 4 October 1876, an explosion of gunpowder killed nine people and severely injured four more.
Louisa	United Kingdom	The pilot boat was run down and sunk in the English Channel off Newhaven, Sussex by the steamship Humboldt (United Kingdom) with the loss of three of her six crew. Survivors were rescued by Humboldt.
Scio	United Kingdom	The brig ran aground off "Oxoe", Denmark. She was on a voyage from Kronstadt, Russia to Great Yarmouth, Norfolk.
Zealous	United Kingdom	The ship was destroyed by fire at Taganrog, Russia.

== 31 August ==
List of shipwrecks: 31 August 1875
Ship	State	Description
Crystal Palace	United Kingdom	The schooner was wrecked on the Haisborough Sands, in the North Sea off the coast of Norfolk with the loss of one of her five crew. Survivors were rescued by the smack William George (United Kingdom). Crystal Palace was on a voyage from Leith, Lothian to Poole, Dorset.
Emily	New Zealand	The 17-ton ketch sailed from Collingwood, New Zealand for Nelson on 18 August, with a crew of two. She was not seen again.
Freedom	United Kingdom	The ship was driven ashore at Cullen, Moray.
Helen	United Kingdom	The sloop was driven ashore east of Lossiemouth, Moray. Both crew were rescued by the Lossiemouth Lifeboat.
Her Majesty	United Kingdom	The paddle steamer collided with the railway bridge over the River Ouse at Goole, Yorkshire and was severely damaged.
Martin Weiner	United Kingdom	The steamship departed from South Shields, County Durham for Hamburg, Germany. Presumed subsequently foundered with the loss of all 22 crew, possibly as a result of an onboard explosion, or having been damaged by striking the wreck of the schooner Second Adventure (United Kingdom) that day. A damaged lifeboat was discovered on 8 September by the steamship Constantine (United Kingdom). Another lifeboat was towed in to Amble, Northumberland by a German brig. The ship's bell, attached to a piece of timber, was discovered in the North Sea 35 nautical miles (65 km) east north east of Spurn Point, Yorkshire in mid-October by the smack Saucy Jack. The finding added weight to the theory of an onboard explosion being responsible for the loss of Martin Weiner.
Second Adventure	United Kingdom	The schooner was run down and sunk off South Shields by the steamship Glannibanta (United Kingdom) with the loss of all hands.

== Unknown date ==
List of shipwrecks: Unknown date in August 1875
Ship	State	Description
Aeron Belle	United Kingdom	The schooner was wrecked on the Bull Sand, in Dublin Bay. Her crew were rescued by the Coastguard.
Agnes	United States	The ship was wrecked at Jacmel, Haiti before 23 August. She was on a voyage from New York to the West Indies.
Algerian	United Kingdom	The steamship ran aground in the Cascade Rapids, in the Saint Lawrence River. Her passengers, about 300 people, were taken off.
Andaluza	Flag unknown	The ship was driven ashore near Gibraltar. She was on a voyage from Trieste to the Rio Grande. She was refloated with the assistance of a tug and taken in to Gibraltar.
Brycedale	United Kingdom	The ship was wrecked on Bird Island, Cape Colony before 5 August.
Capella	United Kingdom	The ship was driven ashore at Grand-Métis, Quebec, Canada. She was on a voyage from Saint-Thomas, Quebec to Belfast, County Antrim.
Edith Grant	United Kingdom	The ship ran aground on the Stone Breaker. She was on a voyage from the Bull River to a European port. She was refloated and put back to the Bull River.
Geraldine	United Kingdom	The ship ran aground. She was on a voyage from Blyth, Northumberland to Kertch, Russia. She was refloated and taken in to Kertch.
Islay	United Kingdom	The steamship was driven ashore on Rathlin Island, County Donegal. She was refloated on 1 September and taken in to the Clyde.
Jannet Sherran	United Kingdom	The schooner departed from London in early August for a port in the north of England. No further trace, presumed foundered with the loss of all hands.
Milford	United Kingdom	The ship was abandoned off the coast of the Cape Colony. Her 35 crew survived. She was on a voyage from Calcutta, India to the Nieuwe Diep. She came ashore at Zitsikama Point and was wrecked.
Naval Brigade	Queensland	The barque was lost whilst on a voyage from Townsville to Java, Netherlands East Indies. Her crew survived.
Navis	United Kingdom	The ship was driven ashore near Kertch.
Nueva Eloisa	Spain	The ship was wrecked at "Real de los Catalanes" before 24 August.
Nyanza	United Kingdom	The ship was wrecked at St. Mary's. She was on a voyage from Port Medway, Nova Scotia to Liverpool.
Olaf	(Russian Empire) Finnish Naval Equippage	The frigate caught fire at Copenhagen, Denmark in late August and was scuttled. Her crew were rescued. She was refloated the next day. Subsequently taken to Kronstadt, Russia for repairs.
Orage	France	The ship was driven ashore at Kastrup, Denmark. She was on a voyage from Söderhamn, Sweden to Gloucester, United Kingdom. She was refloated and taken in to Copenhagen, Denmark.
Queen of England	United Kingdom	The ship was driven ashore at Matane, Quebec. She was on a voyage from Quebec City, Canada to Granton, Lothian.
Racine	France	The barque collided with Lilian ( Canada) and sank in the Atlantic Ocean. Her crew were rescued.
Reaper	United Kingdom	The schooner was driven ashore on Skagen, Denmark. She was refloated and resumed her voyage.
Robert Boak	United Kingdom	The ship was abandoned at sea. Her crew were rescued by the full-rigged ship Colonia (United States). Robert Boak was on a voyage from Cardiff, Glamorgan to Hong Kong.
Rogate	Norway	The ship was abandoned in the Atlantic Ocean before 23 August.
Snorre Sturlsson	Flag unknown	The ship was wrecked near Port Alfred, Cape Colony. She was on a voyage from London, United Kingdom to Port Alfred.
Sophia	United Kingdom	The sloop was driven ashore at Great Yarmouth, Norfolk. All on board were rescued by the Gorleston Lifeboat.
Velox	Norway	The barque was abandoned in the Atlantic Ocean. She was discovered on 8 August by the steamship Republic ( (United Kingdom of Great Britain and Ireland) ), which put some of her crew on board with the intention of taking her in to Queenstown, County Cork, United Kingdom.
William Fraser	United Kingdom	The ship departed from Colchester, Essex in early August for a port in the north of England. No further trace, presumed foundered with the loss of all hands.
