= HMS Waterwitch (1866) =

Gunboat of the Royal Navy

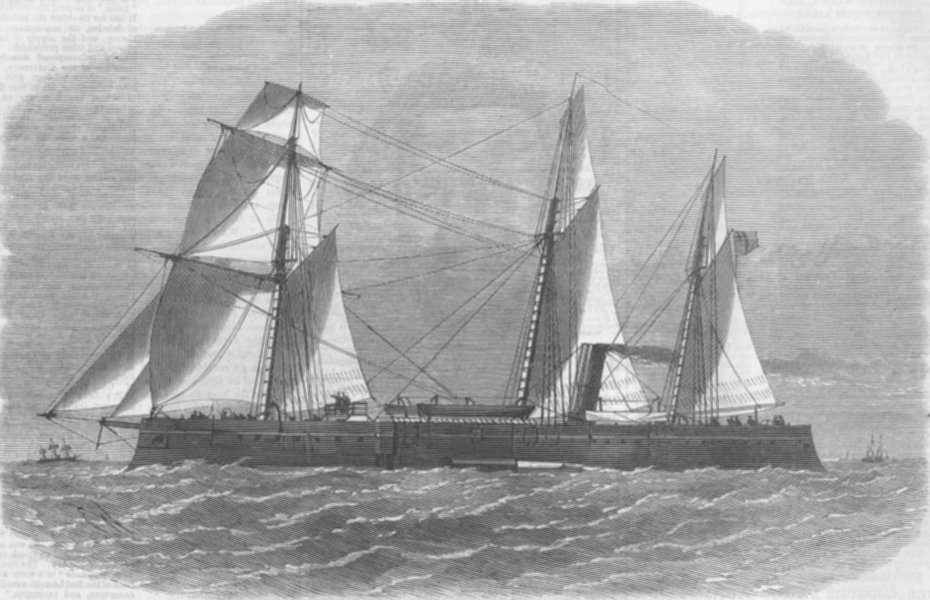
- Waterwitch under sail, from the Illustrated London News

History

United Kingdom
- Name: HMS Waterwitch
- Ordered: 29 October 1864
- Builder: Thames Ironworks and Shipbuilding Company
- Laid down: 1864
- Launched: 28 June 1866
- Commissioned: 1867
- Fate: Sold for breaking 26 April 1890

General characteristics
- Displacement: 1,280 tons
- Tons burthen: 777 bm
- Length: 162 ft (49.4 m) pp
- Beam: 32 ft 1 in (9.8 m)
- Draught: 11 ft (3.4 m)
- Installed power: 167 nominal horsepower; 780 ihp (580 kW)
- Propulsion: 2 × Maudslay iron fire-tube boilers; 6 × furnaces; 3-cylinder horizontal Ruthven "hydraulic reaction engine" by J & W Dudgeon
- Sail plan: Barquentine rig
- Speed: 8.9 kn (16.5 km/h)
- Complement: 80
- Armament: 2 × 7-inch (6½-ton) muzzle-loading rifled guns; 2 × RBL 20-pounder guns
- Armour: 4 1/2 in (11 cm) iron belt and bulkheads with 10 in (25 cm) of teak backing

HMS Waterwitch was one of only three armoured gunboats built for the Royal Navy. Uniquely, she was powered by Ruthven's "hydraulic propeller", making her the first ship to employ waterjets. She was launched in 1866 and conducted comparative trials with her two sister ships. She was not employed operationally and was sold in 1890.

== Design ==
Designed by Rear Admiral George Eliot and the Controller's Department, Waterwitch was a half-sister to Vixen and Viper, and all three were built mostly as experimental vessels. While Viper and Vixen were twin screw vessels, Waterwitch had a water-pump propulsion system. Vixen was almost identical to Viper, but was of composite construction.

=== Hull ===
Waterwitch was an armoured gunboat of the breastwork type, with a hull constructed of iron. Her 4 1/2-inch (11 cm) armour plating was backed by 10 inches (25 cm) of teak and extended for about 60 feet (18 m) amidships.

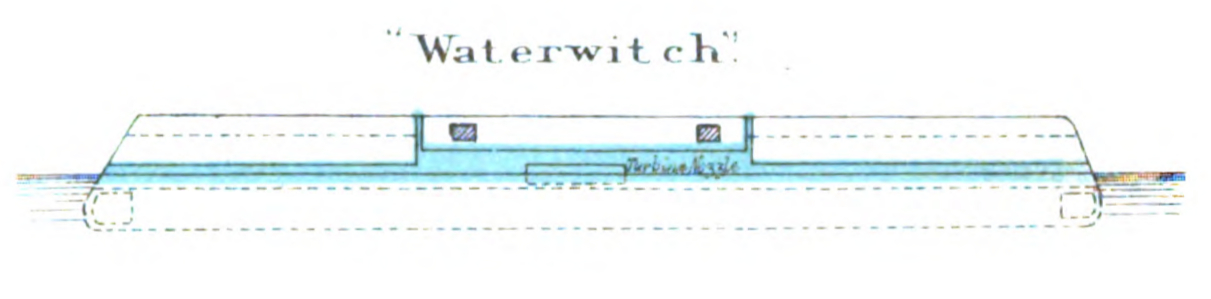
A contemporary cut-away diagram of Waterwitch

The bottom of the armoured box extended 3 to 4 feet (0.9 to 1.2 m) below the waterline and up to the upperdeck. The forward and aft ends of the box were similarly armoured, although the front end also extended upwards by a further 5 feet 6 inches (1.7 m). In addition, a waterline armoured belt extended for the whole length of the vessel. She and her two sisters were the only armoured gunboats ever built for the Royal Navy. Unlike her sisters, she was fitted with a bow rudder as well as the traditional stern rudder.

=== Sail plan ===
She was equipped with a barquentine rig.

=== Armament ===
Waterwitch was armed with two 7-inch (6½-ton) muzzle-loading rifled guns and two 20-pounder breech-loading rifled guns.

=== Propulsion ===
Waterwitch's unique propulsion system was essentially a vast centrifugal steam-powered pump which drew water from sluices in the centre of the vessel and ejected it in jets from adjustable nozzles. Two sets of nozzles were provided, one for ahead propulsion and one for astern propulsion. Steam was provided by two Maudslay iron fire-tube boilers fed from six furnaces. The horizontal Ruthven "hydraulic reaction engine" was manufactured by J & W Dudgeon and comprised a wheel 14 feet 6 inches (4.4 m) in diameter weighing 8 long tons (8,100 kg) and contained within a case 19 feet (5.8 m) across. The wheel was rotated by three steam cylinders and developed 780 indicated horsepower (580 kW). The hopes of safety, performance and control that were expected from this propulsion were summed up by Mr. M. W Ruthven:

My efforts to make a ship safe, from an engineer's point of view, lie in the method of propulsion. My plans are to apply all the engine-power of the ship to pumps for propulsion, and which can be used for pumping out leakage and propelling at the same time. In the largest pump I have made, 800 indicated horsepower discharged 350 tons of water a minute, and propelled the vessel faster than her sister ships with twin screws. The hydraulic propeller is of greatest value for the highest speeds, and has the greatest power of control. As the hydraulic is capable of subdivision to a great degree, the greatest amount of safety is possible. After an experience of sixty years of hydraulic propulsion, I am still of opinion that it is the means by which greater safety can be obtained at sea, and by which the highest speeds can be obtained with safety and economy

— Mr M W Ruthven, son of the inventor

== Construction ==
Waterwitch was ordered from the Thames Ironworks and Shipbuilding Company on 29 October 1864 and laid down the same year. She was launched on 28 June 1866 and commissioned on 26 June 1867 under Commander Philip Ruffle Sharpe for comparative trials.

== Career ==
Waterwitch moored between buoys

Vixen, Viper and Waterwitch conducted comparative trials at Stokes Bay in the Solent the late 1860s. Although turning ability was impressive, and Waterwitch most impressive of all in this respect, none of the ships attained more than 9.5 kn (17.6 km/h) in an era when Warrior could achieve 14.5 kn (26.9 km/h). She was inspected by the American admiral commanding the European Squadron, Admiral David Farragut in 1867.

None of the armoured gunboats performed well in the trials because of their inefficient hull form. Waterwitch was no worse than Viper or Vixen in the speed trials and manoeuvred impressively. Nevertheless, a huge internal volume was required for the internal "hydraulic propeller" and there was little in favour of this early form of jetboat over the then nearly ubiquitous screw propulsion.

She carried out inclining tests in Keyham Basin, Devonport on 16 March 1871. She seems to have spent much of the rest of her life as a test bed alongside in Portsmouth.

== Fate ==
Placed on the non-effective list long before disposal, she was sold to Castle for breaking at Charlton on 26 April 1890.
