= PS Avalon =

British paddle steamer (1864–1909)

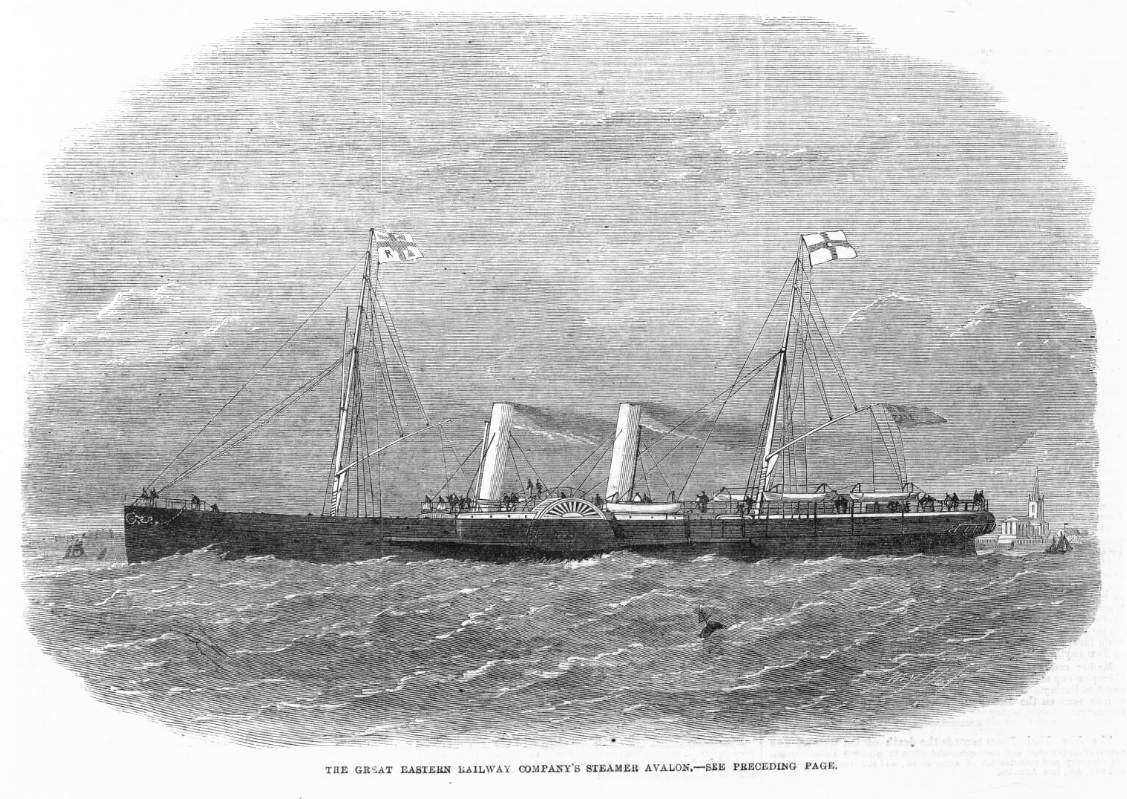
- The first Avalon, 1864

History
- Name: 1864: Avalon (first); 1864–1865: City of Richmond; 1865–unknown: Agnes Arkle
- Operator: 1864: Great Eastern Railway; 1864–1865: Edwin Golbourne; 1865: George Arkle; 1865–unknown: Brazilian Packet Company
- Port of registry: London
- Builder: J & W Dudgeon, Cubitt Town, London
- Launched: 26 March 1864
- Maiden voyage: 9 June 1864

General characteristics
- Tonnage: 670 gross register tons (GRT)
- Length: 239.8 feet (73.1 m)
- Beam: 27 feet (8.2 m)
- Depth: 13.5 feet (4.1 m)

PS Avalon was British paddle steamer launched in 1864. It was an iron paddle passenger vessel built on the River Thames for the Great Eastern Railway for their ferry services from Harwich to Rotterdam and Antwerp. Before the end of that year she was bought by British interests to assist with the commissioning of the Confederate iron-clad CSS Stonewall, and renamed City of Richmond. After the war she was renamed Agnes Arkle and sold in Brazil in 1865.

Following the sale of the first vessel, the Railway company ordered a replacement Avalon, which was completed in 1865, to restore a three-ship fleet. After 23 years' service, she was sold, and after conversion to screw propeller propulsion, bought by a Norwegian who worked her in the Caribbean. She was wrecked in Jamaica in 1909.

== The first Avalon ==
In 1863 the Great Eastern Railway (GER) commenced cargo and cattle services to the Continent from Harwich, using chartered ships, and at the same time ordered a trio of large passenger ships from the Thames-side shipbuilder J & W Dudgeon at Cubitt Town, London. Avalon was the first to be launched, on 26 March 1864, and was christened by the wife of the GER chairman, James Goodson. He already owned a yacht named Avalon, after the mythical Arthurian island associated with Glastonbury, where he had family connections. In its report of her trial trip on 22 May 1864 from Tilbury to the Mouse Light, she was described by the Essex Standard:

She is a paddle-steamer of 220-horse-power; her cylinders are 54 inches in diameter, with a stroke of 4 feet six inches. Their mean propulsion is 42 revolutions a minute, with a pressure of 28lbs., and a vacuum of 27 in. The paddles which are 16 feet in diameter, are fitted with feathering floats, 8 feet 6 inches long, by 2 feet 10 inches broad. Each engine is fitted with 2 air-pumps, and a separate condenser, so that they are perfectly independent one of the other; and in the event of any break down in the machinery of one, the power of the other will remain intact, and be sufficient to propel the vessel. They are fitted with bilge and feed pumps and a link motion, so as to work the steam expansively. The vessel is 230 feet in length, the breadth of her beam is 27 feet, her depth 13 feet, and her tonnage (builder’s measurement) 830 tons. She draws 6ft 10in. of water fore, and 7 ft. 2 in. aft; and her speed is estimated to average from 13 to 14 knots.

Avalon had accommodation for 250 1st class and 60-70 2nd class passengers. Prior to entering service, she was made available on 4 June 1864 to the Royal Harwich Yacht Club (of which Goodson was Commodore) to cruise to view the participants in the Royal Thames Yacht Club's annual Thames-Harwich yacht race. Avalon inaugurated the GER's twice-weekly Harwich-Rotterdam route on 9 June, and a month later was joined by sister ship Zealous.

The shallow waters of the Brielle Bar at the mouth of the River Maas, could only be passed safely close to high water, leading to complaints over delays in the fixed time schedule. The GER consequently decided to introduce a "tidal service" from 2 September 1864. On the previous day, after an overnight positioning voyage from Harwich to Rotterdam without passengers, and in charge of a Rotterdam pilot, Avalon passed inside the Hook of Holland but ran aground at Maassluis. She was refloated with the assistance of tugs from Rotterdam on 3 September without material damage.

=== American Civil War ===
In December 1864 shipowner Edwin Golbourne of Tranmere, Cheshire, acquired Avalon on behalf of the Crenshaw Company, a Confederate blockade running firm, and renamed her City of Richmond. The Confederacy's chief purchasing agent, James Bulloch hired the ship to covertly supply the iron-clad CSS Stonewall after acquisition in Denmark, then with the cover-name Olinde. City of Richmond officially cleared Customs at London for Bermuda in the new year, and sailed from Greenhithe on 11 January. Thirteen days later, commanded by Lieutenant Hunter Davidson, she rendezvoused with Stonewall off Belle Île, on the coast of Brittany, France, then sailed to Ferrol, Spain, to transfer stores, as well as additional crew from CSS Rappahannock and CSS Florida. From Ferrol, City of Richmond sailed to Bermuda and then Nassau, Bahamas.

=== Later service ===
After the end of the American civil war, City of Richmond was sold to George Arkle of Liverpool and renamed Agnes Arkle. She was sent to Brazil for sale, arriving in Rio de Janeiro on 12 September 1865 and was chartered in December by the French passenger liner company Messageries Impériales for their feeder service from Rio de Janeiro, its Trans-Atlantic terminus, to the River Plate. By 8 December Agnes Arkle was reported sold to the Brazilian Packet Company for 175 million reís. In early January 1866 concern was reported that Agnes Arkle was overdue at Bahia, six days out from Rio de Janeiro, carrying 2 million reís in Government notes.

== The second Avalon ==
History
- Name: Avalon (second)
- Operator: 1865–1888: Great Eastern Railway; 1888–1900: Earle's Shipbuilding and Engineering Company, Hull; 1900–1902: Channel Dry Docks, Passage West; 1902–1909: Thomas Rasmussen, Stavanger, Norway
- Builder: J & W Dudgeon, Cubitt Town, London
- Launched: 1865
- Completed: September 1865
- Fate: Wrecked in Jamaica, 1909

General characteristics
- Type: passenger-cargo ferry; cargo (from 1891)
- Tonnage: 670 GRT; 845 GRT (from 1891)
- Length: 239.8 feet (73.1 m); 243.0 feet (74.1 m) (from 1891)
- Beam: 27 feet (8.2 m)
- Depth: 13.5 feet (4.1 m)
- Propulsion: paddle; screw from 1891

Following the sale of the first Avalon, the GER ordered a replacement from J & W Dudgeon, to run alongside Zealous and Ravensbury. She carried out her trials on 16 September 1865. The second Avalon was a little larger than her predecessor, at 245 feet in length, and was redesigned with significant capacity for cargo and livestock, and a reduced passenger accommodation for 100 1st class and 45 2nd class passengers.

The new ship served on both the Antwerp and Rotterdam route. On 11 July 1866, Avalon run down and sank the stone-dredging boat Royal William, without loss of life, when entering Harwich from Rotterdam. On 31 December 1871, again arriving at Harwich from Rotterdam, her engine's main shaft broke, disabling her. Her fleet-mate Richard Young was just leaving port for Antwerp and towed her in port. In 1876 Avalon's engine was given new cylinders, raising its power to 240 NHP, and her boilers were renewed, at the Victoria Graving Dock Company, London, returning to service on 5 September. On 22 July 1879, en route from Rotterdam to Harwich and 50 nautical miles (93 km) off the Dutch coast, the starboard paddle shaft broke; with continued use of the other paddle, and some sail assistance, Avalon was able to complete her voyage without assistamce.

Fire broke out, probably in the galley, on Avalon on 18 September 1881 while berthed at Rotterdam, causing serious damage to the bridge, paddle wheels, boats and some cargo before being extinguished; she was later repaired and returned to service. Avalon was advertised for sale in June 1888, and purchased by Earle's Shipbuilding and Engineering Co.

=== Later history ===
The Earle's Company converted Avalon from paddle propulsion to screw propeller, lengthened her by three feet, and installed a new triple expansion engine of 175 NHP and 700 IHP of their own manufacture. From 1890 she traded as a cargo ship while remaining in the ownership of Earle's. In 1900 she was sold to the Channel Dry Docks, Shipbuilding & Engineering Company of Passage West, near Cork, Ireland, who offered her for sale in May 1901 after repairs, and then by auction in November.

Avalon remained laid up at Passage West until sold in September 1902 to Thomas Rasmussen, of Stavanger, Norway. She was sent by 1902 to operate between the US East Coast and the Caribbean Islands. She was wrecked during a storm in Buff Bay, Jamaica on 4 November 1909. On a ballast voyage Port Antonio to Montego Bay, Jamaica, she lost power off the Jamaican coast and was blown ashore.
