= Eureka Council =

Australian organisation

The Eureka Council Inc. is an Australian organisation dedicated to the social, cultural, and heritage needs of Colonial and Anzac Australians. It promotes national pride, preservation of heritage and history, and Australian arts.

== History ==
The Eureka Council was conceived in 1998 and registered in January 2003. It is an incorporated association or government-registered non-profit group.

== Activities ==
Most recently, the Eureka Council has been involved in the fight to save a national treasure from property developers. Rose Cottage and the Australian Pioneer Village in Hawkesbury, NSW is currently being threatened by a local council resolution to sell the artefacts contained in the village. A rally was held on the 28 June 2009, with an expected attendance of 1000 people - over 5000 people attended on the day which is a clear indication of the level of support from the general public. The Eureka Council Executive has petitioned the local council using 'moral-force' persuasion, a style used by John Basson Humffray who headed up the Ballarat Reform League during the Eureka Stockade rebellion of 1854. Through this 'moral-force' approach, it is expected the decision will be reviewed and overturned by the local council.

Currently, the Eureka Council, through their Victorian Representative, is working with the Hepburn Shire Council on several gold history related projects. The Hepburn Shire Council encompasses the area to the north of Ballarat including the towns of Creswick, Clunes, Daylesford and Trentham. All these towns have a rich gold history with Clunes, Victoria taking the claim of being the place where gold was first discovered in Victoria. The projects involve such initiatives as storyboards at the New Australasian Mine No. 2 shaft, the scene of Australia's worst gold mining accident where in early December 1882, 22 men lost their lives when water broke through to where they were working from an adjacent mine. Other projects include creating a gold trail linking Geelong, Ballarat, Creswick, Clunes and Bendigo, as well as restoring the quartz crushing battery in Creswick.

== Historical significance ==
The Eureka Council web site is indexed as "a site of cultural and historical significance" by the National Library of Australia, in Canberra.
