= Dick Young =

Dick Young may refer to:

- Dick Young (cricketer) (1885–1968), English Test cricketer
- Dick Young (sportswriter) (1917–1987), American sportswriter
- Dick Young (baseball) (1928–2018), American baseball player
- Dick Young (footballer) (1939–1989), English footballer (Grimsby Town)
- Dick Young (American football player) (1930–2012), American football fullback and halfback
- Dick Young (American football coach) (1937–2022), American college football coach
- Dick Young (coach), athletic director and baseball coach at Bowling Green State University
- Dick Young (producer), American film producer, director, and cinematographer

== See also ==
- Richard Young (disambiguation)
