= HMS Viper (1865) =

Gunboat of the Royal Navy

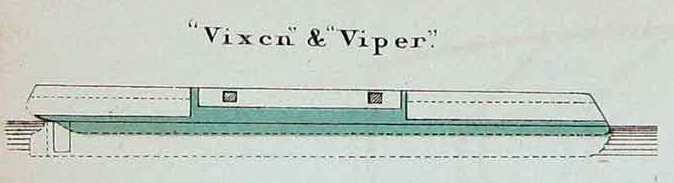
- A contemporary cut away diagram of Viper

History

United Kingdom
- Name: HMS Viper
- Ordered: 22 March 1864
- Builder: J & W Dudgeon, Cubitt Town, London
- Cost: £51,127
- Laid down: 1864
- Launched: 21 December 1865
- Commissioned: 1866
- Fate: Harbour service 1890; Tank vessel 1901; Sold at Bermuda 1908

General characteristics
- Displacement: 1,228 tons
- Tons burthen: 737 bm
- Length: 160 ft (49 m) pp
- Beam: 32 ft (9.8 m)
- Draught: 11 ft (3.4 m)
- Installed power: 696 ihp (519 kW)
- Propulsion: Two 2-cylinder horizontal single-expansion steam engines by Maudslay, Sons & Field; Twin screws
- Sail plan: Barquentine rig (removed 1873)
- Speed: 9.5 kn (17.6 km/h)
- Complement: 80
- Armament: 2 × 7-inch (6½-ton) muzzle-loading rifled guns; 2 × RBL 20-pounder guns
- Armour: 4.5 in (11 cm) iron belt and bulkheads with 10 in (25 cm) of teak backing

HMS Viper was an armoured iron gunboat, the only ship of her class, and the fourteenth ship of the Royal Navy to bear the name.

== Design ==
Designed by the Admiralty, Viper was a half-sister to Vixen and Waterwitch, and all three were built mostly as experimental vessels. While Viper and Vixen were twin screw vessels, Waterwitch had a water-pump propulsion system. Vixen was almost identical to Viper, but was of composite construction.

=== Hull ===
Viper was an armoured gunboat of the breastwork type. Her hull was of iron construction, with 10 in (25 cm) of teak backing. Vertical trunks were provided at the stern to lift the screws clear of the hull, thereby allowing a better hull-form for purely wind-driven sailing.

=== Propulsion ===
She was equipped with two sets of 4-cylinder horizontal single-expansion steam engines, each set powering one of her two-bladed, 9 ft diameter Maudslay & Griffiths screws. In total she developed an indicated 696 horsepower, sufficient for a top speed of 9.5 knots (17.6 km/h). Steam was provided by two Maudslay iron fire-tube boilers with six furnaces.

=== Sail plan ===
She was equipped with a barquentine rig, but in 1873 all masts, rigging and upper deck obstructions were removed after the decision for Vixen and Viper to remain permanently in Bermuda.

=== Armament ===
Viper was armed with two 7-inch (6½-ton) muzzle-loading rifled guns and two 20-pounder breech-loading rifled guns. One of Vixen or Viper's 7-inch guns was displayed on the waterfront at St Georges as recently as 1991.

== Construction ==
Viper was ordered from J & W Dudgeon of Cubitt Town on 22 March 1864 and laid down the same year. She was launched on 21 December 1865 and commissioned in 1867 for comparative trials. Her total cost was £51,127.

== Career ==
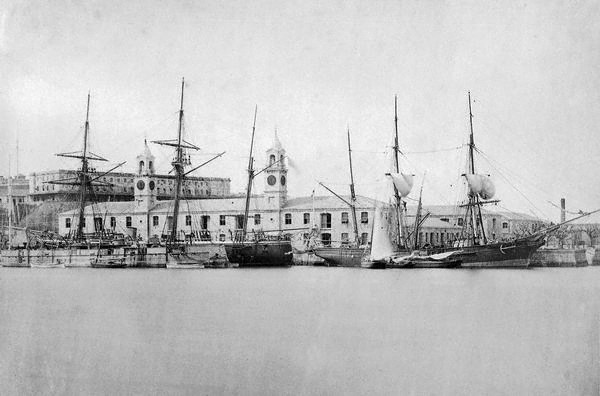
Identical half-sister Vixen (left) at Bermuda Dockyard

Vixen, Viper and Waterwitch conducted comparative trials at Stokes Bay in the Solent during the late 1860s. Although turning ability was impressive, none of the ships attained more than 9.5 kn (17.6 km/h) in an era when Warrior could achieve 14.5 kn (26.9 km/h). Furthermore, Vixen was nearly lost in the Irish Channel during a winter gale in 1876, making them unsuitable for the open sea under steam or sail. Vixen and Viper were towed to Bermuda in 1868 where the geography favoured the use of steam-powered rams.

In July 1869 both ships were employed to bring the floating dock Bermuda from The Narrows to the dockyard. 1873 saw the loss of all rigging, masts and upperdeck equipment, and this must have helped her to survive the 1878 hurricane which caused serious damage to the floating dock and other dockyard facilities.

== Fate ==
Viper was reduced to harbour service in 1890, was converted to a tank vessel in 1901 and was sold in 1908.
