= HMS Vixen (1865) =

Armoured composite gunboat

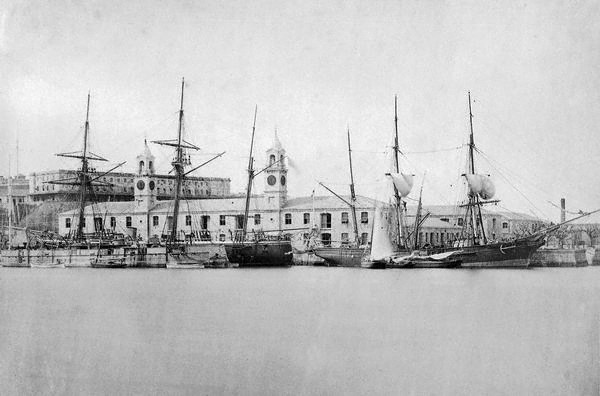
- Vixen (left) and the barque Nightwatch (right) at Bermuda Dockyard between 1867 and 1873

History

United Kingdom
- Name: HMS Vixen
- Ordered: 22 March 1864
- Builder: Charles Lungley, Deptford
- Cost: £54,193
- Laid down: 1864
- Launched: 18 November 1865
- Commissioned: 1866
- Fate: Sold at Bermuda in December 1895; Sunk as a blockship c.1896

General characteristics
- Displacement: 1,228 tons
- Tons burthen: 754 bm
- Length: 160 ft (49 m) pp
- Beam: 32 ft (9.8 m)
- Draught: 11 ft (3.4 m) maximum
- Installed power: 740 ihp (550 kW)
- Propulsion: Two 2-cylinder horizontal single-expansion steam engines by Maudslay, Sons & Field; Twin screws
- Sail plan: Barquentine rig (removed 1873)
- Speed: 8.9 kn (16.5 km/h)
- Range: 1,080 nmi (2,000 km) at maximum speed
- Complement: 80
- Armament: 2 × 7-inch (6½-ton) muzzle-loading rifled guns; 2 × RBL 20-pounder guns
- Armour: 4.5 in (11 cm) iron belt and bulkheads on 10 in (25 cm) of teak

HMS Vixen was an armoured composite gunboat, the only ship of her class, and the third ship of the Royal Navy to bear the name. She was the first Royal Navy vessel to have twin propellers.

== Design ==
Designed by the Admiralty, Vixen was a half-sister to Viper and Waterwitch, and all three were built mostly as experimental vessels. While Viper and Vixen were twin screw vessels, Waterwitch had a water-pump propulsion system. Viper differed from Vixen mainly in her iron construction.

=== Hull ===
Vixen was an armoured gunboat of the breastwork type. Her hull was of composite construction, with iron frames and iron bulwarks, but with an outer cladding of 140 mm (5.5 in) teak over the entire hull. An armoured citadel protected her machinery and the ram bow was reinforced by massive ironwork structures. Underwater, her hull was sheathed in copper to prevent marine growth. Vertical trunks were provided at the stern to lift the screws clear of the hull, thereby allowing a better hull-form for purely wind-driven sailing.

=== Propulsion ===
She was equipped with two sets of 4-cylinder horizontal single-expansion steam engines, each set powering one of her two-bladed, 9 ft diameter Maudslay & Griffiths screws. In total she developed an indicated 740 horsepower, sufficient for a top speed of 8.9 knots (16.5 km/h). Steam was provided by two Maudslay iron fire-tube boilers with six furnaces.

=== Sail plan ===
She was equipped with a barquentine rig, but in 1873 all masts, rigging and upper deck obstructions were removed after the decision for Vixen and Viper to remain permanently in Bermuda.

=== Armament ===
Vixen was armed with two 7-inch (6½-ton) muzzle-loading rifled guns and two 20-pounder breech-loading rifled guns. One of Vixen or Viper's 7-inch guns was displayed on the waterfront at St George's as recently as 1991.

== Construction ==
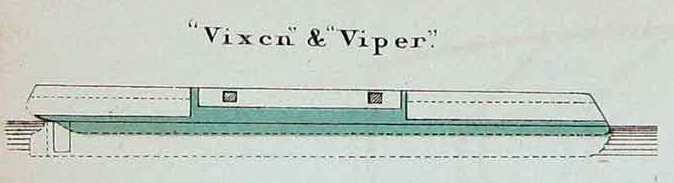
A contemporary cut-away diagram of Vixen

Vixen was ordered from Charles Lungley of Deptford on 22 March 1864 and laid down the same year. She was launched on 18 November 1865 and commissioned in 1866 under Commander Spencer Phipps Brett for comparative trials. Her total cost was £54,193.

== Career ==
Vixen, Viper, and Waterwitch conducted comparative trials at Stokes Bay during the late 1860s. Although turning ability was impressive, none of the ships attained more than 9 1/2 knots (17.6 km/h) in an era when Warrior could achieve 14 1/2 knots (26.9 km/h). Furthermore, Vixen was nearly lost in the Irish Channel during a winter gale in 1876, making her unsuitable for the open sea under steam or sail. Vixen and Viper were towed to Bermuda in 1868 where they operated within the reefline as floating defensive batteries, extending the defences of the Royal Naval Dockyard, Bermuda.

In July 1869, both ships were employed to bring the floating dock Bermuda from The Narrows to the dockyard, and in 1870, Vixen rescued a disabled barque. 1873 saw the loss of all rigging, masts and upperdeck equipment, and this must have helped her to survive the 1878 hurricane which caused serious damage to the floating dock and other dockyard facilities. In 1895, she was used as an accommodation hulk for dockyard labourers and in 1895 listed as 'to be sold' in the Navy List.

The Daniel's Head Channel Act (1887) had authorised the sinking of a blockship to close the channel, but the Hydrographer's Report of 1888 declared the approaches from that direction safe from attack. By December 1895, Vixen had been sold to a local scrap merchant. In 1896, Vice-Admiral James Erskine recommended the channel be covered by shore batteries against torpedo boat attack, and in order to make such boats pass close to Daniel's Head, Vixen was sunk in the channel, probably the same year.

== Fate ==
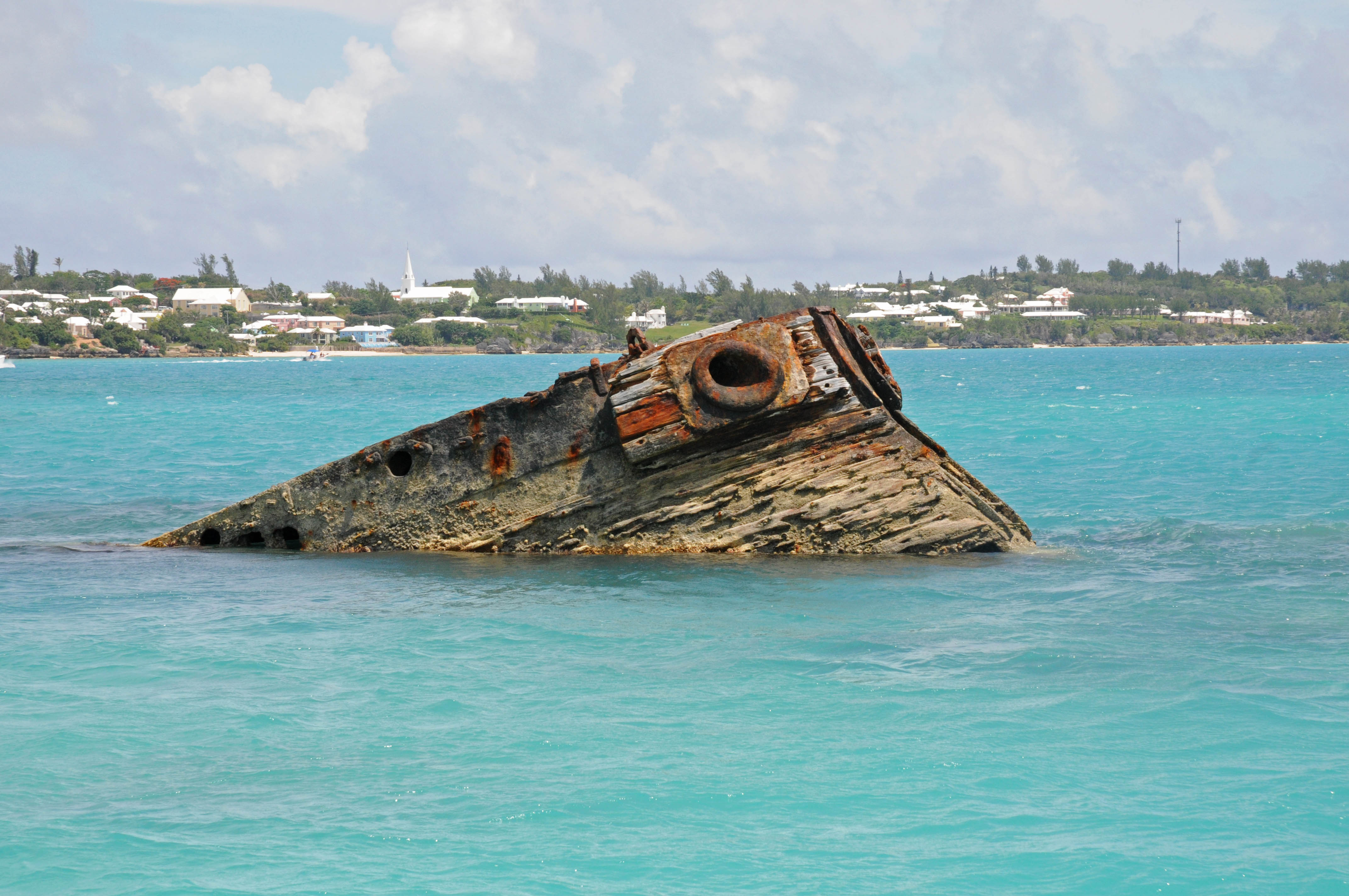
Bermuda, wreck of HMS Vixen

Once her engines had been removed, she was placed across the Chubb Cut and massive scuttling charges were detonated. Her keel was broken, and she settled in her final resting place. Vixen now lies in 10 m (33 ft) of water about 0.2 nmi (0.37 km) offshore from Daniel's Head, at the west end of Bermuda. She lies in a narrow gap in the coral reef, with the bow just above water. She is well known locally and is often visited by glass-bottomed boats and divers, having become something of a tourist attraction. The wreck is visible on satellite imagery in position 32°18′21.31″N 64°53′7.88″W.

== Investigation of the wreck ==
In 1986, Professor Richard Gould began his investigation of the wreck with volunteers from EarthWatch and support from the Bermuda Maritime Museum. By 1988, they had amassed 13 weeks of diving at the site, and in 1991 Gould published "The Archaeology of HMS Vixen, an early ironclad ram in Bermuda" in The International Journal of Nautical Archaeology, giving a comprehensive account of the construction, history and fate of the ship.

== Commanding officers ==
| From | To | Captain |
|---|---|---|
| 29 September 1866 | 25 January 1867 | Commander Spencer Phipps Brett |
| 17 June 1867 | | Commander Charles Davis Lucas |
| 17 June 1868 | | Commander Louis Hutton Versturme |
