= HMVS Cerberus =

Wrecked navy ship in Victoria, Australia

Coordinates: 37°58′03″S 145°00′28″E

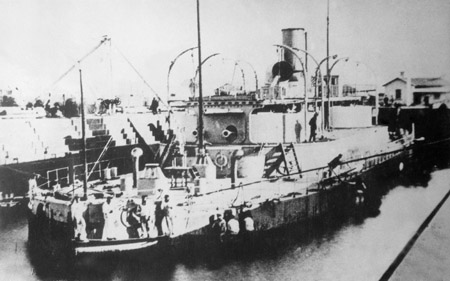
- Cerberus at Williamstown in 1871

History

Victoria, Australia
- Name: HMVS/HMAS Cerberus
- Ordered: 1 July 1867
- Builder: Palmers Shipbuilding and Iron Company, Jarrow
- Laid down: 1 September 1867
- Launched: 2 December 1868
- Completed: August 1870
- Renamed: HMAS Platypus II (1 April 1921)
- Fate: Sunk as breakwater, 2 September 1926
- Badge

General characteristics
- Class & type: Cerberus-class breastwork monitor
- Displacement: 3,340 long tons (3,390 t)
- Length: 225 ft (68.6 m)
- Beam: 45 ft 1 in (13.7 m)
- Draught: 15 ft 6 in (4.7 m)
- Installed power: 1,369 ihp (1,021 kW)
- Propulsion: 2 × shafts, 2 × Maudslay Son & Field steam engines
- Speed: 9.75 knots (18.06 km/h; 11.22 mph) maximum; 6 knots (11 km/h; 6.9 mph) economical
- Complement: 12 officers, 84 sailors; 40 additional in wartime
- Armament: 2 × twin 10-inch rifled muzzle loading guns; 2 × single 12-pdr bronze howitzers; 4 × 4-barrel 1-inch Nordenfelt guns (1883); 2 × single Nordenfelt 6-pdr QF Guns (1890); 2 × single Maxim-Nordenfelt 14-pdr QF guns (1897)
- Armour: Belt: 6 to 8 inches (150 to 200 mm), backed by 9 to 11 inches (230 to 280 mm) of teak; Breastwork: 8 to 9 inches (200 to 230 mm); Turrets: 9-to-10-inch (230 to 250 mm); Deck: 1 to 1.25 inches (25 to 32 mm)

HMVS Cerberus (Her Majesty's Victorian Ship) is a breastwork monitor that served in the Victoria Naval Forces, the Commonwealth Naval Forces (CNF), and the Royal Australian Navy (RAN) between 1871 and 1924.

Built in Jarrow, UK, at Palmers Shipbuilding and Iron Company for the colony of Victoria, Australia, under the supervision of Charles Pasley, Cerberus was completed in 1870, and arrived in Port Phillip, the port of Melbourne on the SE coast of Australia in 1871, where she spent the rest of her career. The monitor was absorbed into the CNF following Federation in 1901, and was renamed HMAS Cerberus when the navy became the RAN in 1911. By World War I, Cerberus' weapons and boilers were inoperable; the ship served as a guardship and munitions store, while carrying the personnel of the fledgling Royal Australian Naval College on her paybooks. In 1921, the ship was renamed HMAS Platypus II, and tasked as a submarine tender for the RAN's six J-class submarines.

- "H.M.A.S. Cerberus, the ship that for many years has been anchored at the mouth of the Yarra serving as a training ship, was towed to Geelong to-day. Under the name Platypus she will now serve as a depot ship and submarine base.
- The Cerberus entered Hobson’s Bay on April 9, 1871, and was then the most modern ironclad afloat, representing the last word in naval architecture; she was certainly at that, time the most powerful vessel in the southern seas.
- She was built to the order of the Victorian Government, whose navy then consisted of the frigates Victoria and Nelson. In recognition of the part played by Victoria in the New Zealand war, the Imperial government granted £100,000 to the new State toward the cost of a modern warship.
- The voyage of the Cerberus to Australia occupied five months, and fears were entertained that she would founder. She rolled to forty degrees, and her out-of-water weight was 1,900 tons as compared with an under-water weight of 1,800 tons. The Victorian flag was hoisted on the ship at Port Said on December in 1870.
- The Cerberus remained at the Yarra mouth so long that special derricks had to be used to lift her anchors."

— 1921, A Page of History, Famous Ship Leaves Her Old Moorings.

In 1924, the monitor was sold for scrap, and was scuttled as a breakwater off Half Moon Bay. The wreck became a popular site for scuba diving and picnics over the years, but there was a structural collapse in 1993. There have been several campaigns to preserve the ship (one of which is ongoing), as she is one of the last monitors, the only surviving ship of the Australian colonial navies, and one of only two surviving ships in the world with Coles turrets.

== Design ==
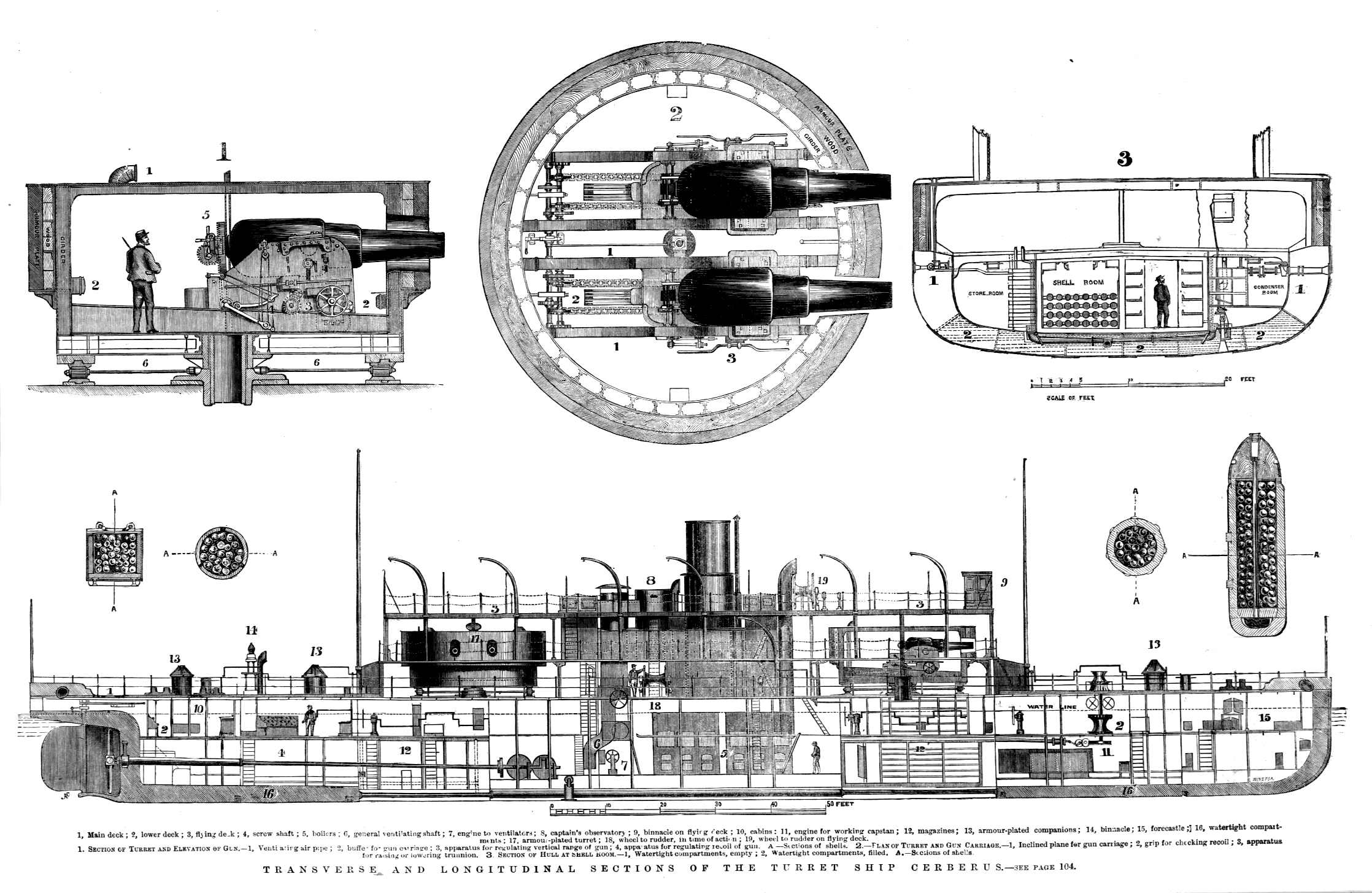
Transverse and longitudinal sections, 1871 engraving

Named for Cerberus, the three-headed guard dog of Hades from Greek mythology, Cerberus was the first of the breastwork monitors, which differed from previous ironclad warships by the fitting of a central superstructure containing rotating turrets. The ship was designed by Edward James Reed, Chief Constructor to the Royal Navy. Cerberus had one sister ship, HMS Magdala, and an additional five ships of similar design (HMS Abyssinia and the four Cyclops class monitors) were constructed for coastal defence around the British Empire. These seven vessels were unofficially referred to as the 'Monster class'.

The monitor was 225 feet (68.6 m) long, 45 feet 1 inch (13.7 m) wide, and with a draught of 15 feet 6 inches (4.7 m). Cerberus had a freeboard of 4 feet (1.2 m), while her breastwork extended 7 feet (2.1 m) above the deck, and was 112 feet (34 m) long. She had a standard ship's company of 12 officers and 84 sailors, with an additional 40 to man the ship in wartime. Cerberus had a maximum speed of 9.75 knots (18.06 km/h; 11.22 mph), with an economical speed of 6 knots (11 km/h; 6.9 mph).

Her twin screws were driven by two horizontal twin-cylinder, double-acting, simple steam engines made by Maudslay Son & Field. They had 43-inch (110 cm) bore, 27-inch (69 cm) stroke, and were provided with 30 psi (210 kPa) steam produced by five coal-fired boilers with 13 furnaces. The steam engines generated 1,369 indicated horsepower (1,021 kW) on trials and drove two propellers with a diameter of 12 feet (3.7 m) Cerberus was the first British warship to be solely steam-powered. The monitor had a bunkerage of 240 tons of coal; this would last just under five days at maximum speed (50 tons consumed per day), and ten days at economical speed (24 tons per day). The monitor was not suited to ocean travel.

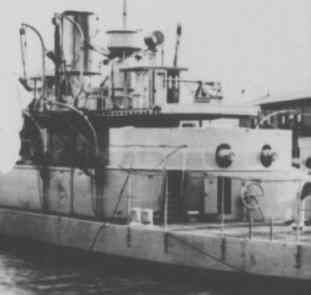
Detail of the front gun turret of HMVS Cerberus with its 10-inch (25 cm) main guns

The main armament was four 10-inch guns, mounted in two turrets. The four guns weighed 18 long tons (18 t) each, were muzzle-loaded, had to be withdrawn completely inside the turret to be reloaded, and could fire a 400-pound (180 kg) shell up to 4,000 yards (3,700 m) once every three minutes. The turrets were mounted fore and aft; each had a crew of 33, had a 270° field of fire, and had to be hand-cranked into position. The turrets were of a design created by Cowper Phipps Coles.

The ship had armour plating ranging from 6 to 8 inches (150 to 200 mm) in thickness for the waterline armoured belt on her hull, which was backed by 9 to 11 inches (230 to 280 mm) of teak. The citadel armour protecting the breastwork ranged in thickness from 8 to 9 inches (200 to 230 mm), and gun turrets had 10-inch (250 mm) faces and 9-inch (230 mm) sides. Cerberus was protected by an armoured deck that was 1 to 1.25 inches (25 to 32 mm) thick. For added protection, Cerberus could take water into ballast tanks, decreasing her already low freeboard until only the turrets and breastwork were visible.

Cerberus and ships of her type were described by Admiral George Alexander Ballard as being like "full-armoured knights riding on donkeys, easy to avoid but bad to close with." Robert Gardiner, Roger Chesneau, and Eugene M. Kolesnik, the editors of Conway's All the World's Fighting Ships 1860–1905, pointed out that "[Cerberus represents] the beginnings of practical turret ship design in Britain, having no sail power and being fitted with fore and aft turrets with almost uninterrupted arcs of fire." When she entered service, the monitor was considered superior to any other warship operating in the Australasian region. The design of Cerberus was upscaled by Sir Edward Reed for HMS Devastation in 1871, the first Royal Navy turreted ironclad battleship without sails, and so had a lasting influence on battleship design until the dreadnoughts appeared in the early 1900s.

== Construction ==
In 1866, the Victorian government ordered a ship to supplement the shore-based fortifications of Port Philip Bay, and to defend the colony in the event of a Russian attack. Cerberus was ordered on the understanding that if she operated in any role other than the defence of Victoria, she would revert to Admiralty control.

The monitor was constructed by Palmers Shipbuilding at their Jarrow-on-Tyne shipyard. She was laid down on 1 August 1867, launched on 2 December 1868, and completed in August 1870. Cerberus cost £117,556 to build, with the British Admiralty meeting 80% of the cost.

== Operational history ==
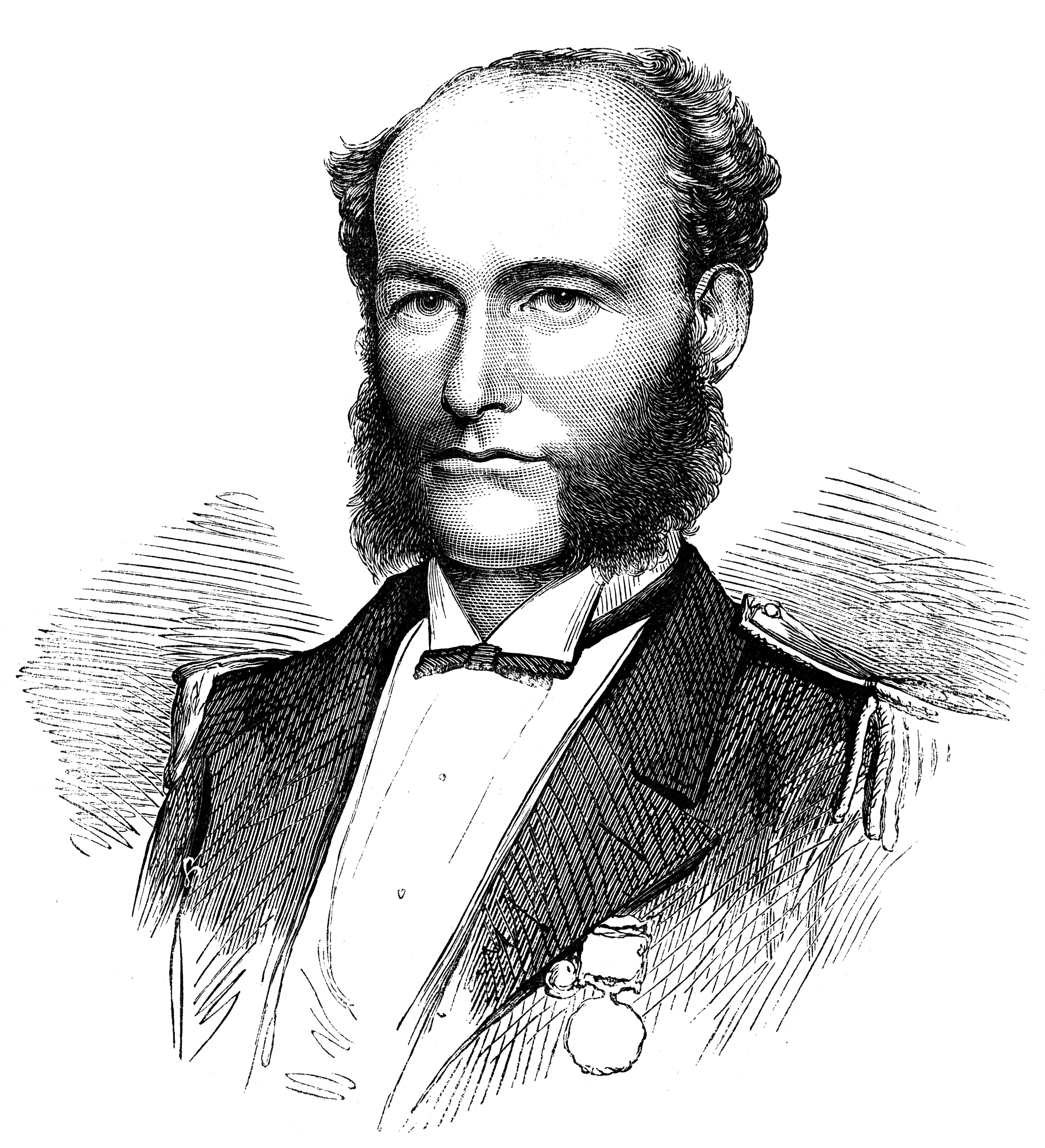
Captain William Henry Panter (1841–1915), first commander of Cerberus (1870–1877)

On completion, Cerberus was registered as a merchant vessel for the voyage to Australia. For the journey, the sides of the hull were built up to the height of the breastwork and along the length of the ship, to improve seakeeping. She first attempted to sail from Chatham for Melbourne on 29 October 1870, but returned within days because of gale conditions, which made the ship uncontrollable. After returning to British waters, Cerberus was fitted with temporary masts so she could be rigged as a three-masted barque; this was to provide redundancy to the steam engines, and maximise her range before recoaling was required. Cerberus departed for a second time on 7 November, and despite similar conditions, was able to persevere. The ship travelled via the Suez Canal (during which she flew the flag of Victoria instead of the Red Ensign so reduced transit rates for warships could be claimed), with frequent stops to refuel wherever possible because of her ten-day bunker capacity. Her flat bottom and shallow draught meant that the monitor could roll up to 40° from the centreline in bad weather. Her ship's company nearly mutinied on several occasions.

The monitor reached Melbourne on the morning of 9 April 1871. Following her arrival, she was designated flagship of the Victorian Navy. At the time of her arrival, public opinion of the ship was low, and she quickly attracted the nickname of 'Floating Gasometer'.

On 5 March 1881, five men from Cerberus were killed when their boat was destroyed by a mine during exercises. These were the only personnel from the ship to be killed during her operational history. Following the flooding of the New Australasian Gold Mine at Creswick, Victoria in December 1882, two divers from Cerberus were sent to help find miners trapped in air pockets deep in the mine. They arrived on 14 December, two days after the flooding, but could not assist because incorrectly fitting dive suits had been sent with them, and only 500 feet (150 m) of air hose was available, despite the miners being at least 1,500 feet (460 m) from the mine's entrance.

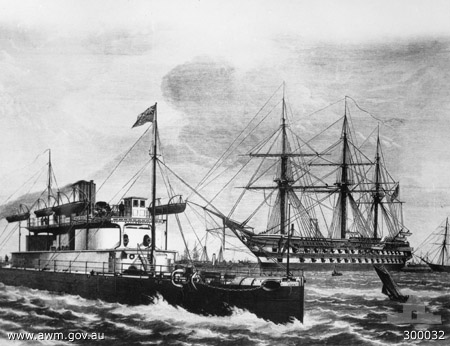
Artist's impression of Cerberus and the training ship HMVS Nelson

The ship was fitted with torpedo netting and spars in 1887. At some point in the 1890s, Cerberus was retasked as a storeship. In May 1900, one of the ship's company began to show the symptoms of the bubonic plague. Consequently, all of Cerberus' personnel were quarantined at Point Nepean.

Following the Federation of Australia in 1901, Cerberus, like all other colonial naval ships, was transferred to the Commonwealth Naval Forces. This organisation was renamed the Royal Australian Navy in 1911, at which point, Cerberus was given the prefix HMAS. By 1909, Cerberus could not generate enough steam to propel herself. She was used as a guard ship and munitions storeship during World War I. When the Royal Australian Naval College was founded in 1913, its personnel were initially listed on the paybooks of Cerberus, as the college was not a commissioned establishment. By 1914, the monitor's main guns were inoperable, and she was reliant on her light weapons for defence.

Following the transfer of six J class submarines to the RAN, Cerberus was renamed HMAS Platypus II on 1 April 1921 (taking her name from the submarine tender HMAS Platypus) and reclassified as a secondary submarine tender. For this role, she was towed to Geelong. Between this date and the monitor's departure from service in 1924, HMAS Protector took the name Cerberus and was attached to the training base at Western Port Bay; the base in turn took the name in 1921.

== Decommissioning and fate ==
Cerberus was sold to the Melbourne Salvage Company for £409 on 23 April 1924, with the buyer to break her up for scrap. The warship was towed from Corio Bay to Williamstown Naval Dockyard on 14 May for disassembly. After the salvage company removed what they could, she was then sold on to the Sandringham council for £150. The monitor was scuttled on 26 September 1926 at Half Moon Bay to serve as a breakwater for the Black Rock Yacht Club. During her life, Cerberus never left Port Philip Bay, and never fired in anger.

The wreck sits in approximately 10 feet (3.0 m) of water, less than 650 feet (200 m) from shore. Over time, the breakwater became a popular site for scuba diving. The ship was penetrable from many openings along both sides, and featured two submerged deck levels with heavy silting. With care and lights, it was possible to travel from stem to stern without leaving the ship. The interior of the ship has also seen use as a training course for assault swimmers. Her exposed decks were regularly used for picnics.

During the 1970s, the Cerberus Preservation Trust was formed to study the feasibility of raising and restoring Cerberus. However, by 1983, the Trust had made little apparent progress.

In 1993, there was a major structural collapse after rusting deck supports and stanchions gave way, leaving only the deck beams to support the deck, turrets, and superstructure. Cerberus began to subside at 16 millimetres (0.63 in) per year. Following this, a 100 metres (330 ft) exclusion zone was placed around the wreck.

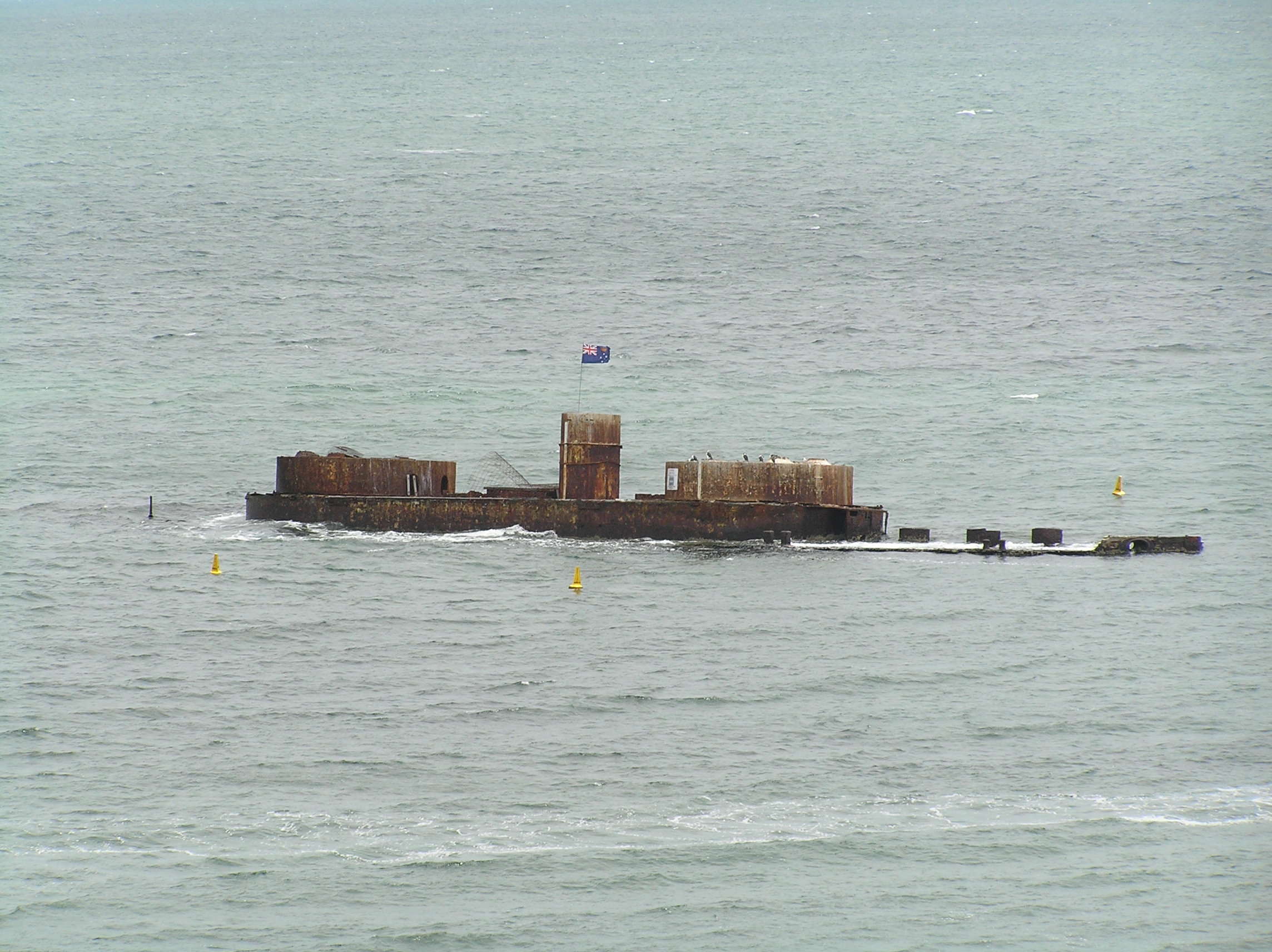
The remains of Cerberus in 2007

In 2001, the Friends of the Cerberus organisation was formed, with the goal of preserving Cerberus. After campaigning by Friends of the Cerberus for funding to remove the four 18-ton guns from the monitor to reduce the load placed on the monitor's deck, the Victorian government provided an A$80,000 grant that was project managed by Heritage Victoria in October 2004. After being coated with preservative and receiving an electrolysis treatment, the guns were placed on the seabed next to the wreck.

From late 2005, Friends of the Cerberus began to campaign for A$5.5 million in funding to stabilise the wreck site, first by installing additional supports for the deck and turrets (the latter weighing 200 tons each), then raising the ship off the seabed and placing her in an underwater cradle. To help attract funds from the Federal and Victorian governments, the wreck was nominated by Friends of the Cerberus and the National Trust for heritage listing, which was achieved on 14 December 2005; Cerberus was also listed on the Victorian Heritage Register and is included on the local Heritage Overlay. In July 2008, an application by Friends of the Cerberus for a grant of A$500,000 of federal funding was successful, with the National Trust of Victoria holding the funds on behalf of Friends of the Cerberus. The money was originally intended for the construction of a jacking frame and support cradle, but in late 2010, it was instead earmarked for structural preservation work on the monitor's gun turrets. By April 2012, the target of the funding had changed again, with plans to spend the grant on corrosion control of the wreck, along with "interpretive devices" on the nearby shore.
