= Richard Younge =

Richard Younge or Young (fl. 1640–1670), Calvinist tract writer, was a member of the family of the Youngs of Roxwell in Essex, where a small estate in Morant's time was still known as "Youngs". In order to be near the best puritan pulpits he settled in Moorgate, and soon became known for his tracts supporting the general view that this world was the hell of the godly and the next world the hell of the ungodly, but more particularly admonishing in no measured terms the errors of the drunkard, the swearer, and the covetous. In his "Curb against Cursing" he commends above his own writing the "Heaven and Hell Epitomised" of George Swinnock; but he went on steadily down to 1671 pouring out penny tracts. Most of them were issued through James Crump, a bookbinder in Little Bartholomew's Well-yard. Many copies were exported to America, while others were either lent on a twopenny security or given away by the author, first at the Black Swan, Moorgate, and afterwards in Cripplegate and Newington Causeway.

== Works ==
His publications comprised:

- "A Counterpoyson, or Soverain Antidote against all Griefe … together with the Victory of Patience", London, 1637, 8vo; a second edition, much enlarged, and recommended by Thomas Westfield and Daniel Featley, appeared in 1641; a "fourth edition" was included in "A Christian Library", mentioned below.
- "Philarguromastix, or the Arraignment of Covetousnesse and Ambition in our great and greedy Cormorants. … By Junius Florilegus", London, 1653, 8vo. He frequently signed himself "Richard Young, of Roxwell, Florilegus".
- "The Blemish of Government, Shame of Religion, Disgrace of Mankinde, or a Charge drawn up against Drunkards, and presented to his Highness the Lord Protector in the name of all the Sober partie in the three Nations", London, 1655, 8vo.
- "A Christian Library, or a Pleasant and Plentiful Paradise of Practical Divinity", London, 1665, 8vo. This bulky volume is stated to contain ten treatises, "like ten small Cornfields now laid together (as it were) within one hedge", prefaced by letters to the "Worthy Authour" and "Ingenuous Reader" by Richard Vines and Richard Baxter. With the original ten are bound up in the British Museum copy eleven additional treatises by Young, all of them apparently being remainder copies of penny tracts by Young in various editions. At the end of a tract called "Apples of Gold" (1654) the printer gives a list of thirty-three separately printed discourses by Young.
- "The Peoples Impartial and Compassionate Monitor, about hearing of Sermons", 1657; an attack upon preaching for rhetorical effect merely, dedicated to Sir Nathanael Basile.
- "The Impartial Monitor: about Following the Fashions … in a rare Example of one that Cured his Wife of her Costlinesse. Imprimatur, Edmund Calamie", London, 1656.
- "The Hearts-Index, or Self-Knowledge", 1659.
- "A Hopefull Way to Cure that horrid Sinne of Swearing", 1660.
- "Mens great losse of Happinesse for not paying the small quit-rent of Thankfulnesse", 1661.
- "A Spark of Divine Light to kindle piety in a frozen Soul … printed for Peter Parker in Popes-head Alley", 1671. This little piece, which he calls his "little Benjamin", was apparently the last of Young's exhortatories. In a postscript he announces "Upon Newington Causeway this Book is freely given to all, but beware of sending for it out of wantonness; for sacrilege is a parching and a blasting sin".

The British Museum Library has nearly thirty of Young's admonitory tracts and other works; but it is hard to differentiate them, owing to the variations of title in successive editions.
