= Richard S. Young =

American biologist and academic

Richard S. Young (died 1996) was an American biologist.

== Life and career ==
Richard Young was born in Kings Park, New York. He attended Gettysburg College and Florida State University.

Young started his career as a research scientist for the Food and Drug Administration.

During the 1960s and 1970s, Young was the head of life sciences exploration program of the U.S. In 1979, he became vice-president of the Rockefeller University.

Young died due to prostate cancer in 1996.
