= Richard Young (activist) =

British activist

Richard Young (1950 – 2023) was a British activist.

== Biography ==
Born in Moreton-in-Marsh, Cotswolds, Young was raised in a farming family, where he developed an early interest in agriculture. He initially practiced conventional farming methods at Swell Hill Farm, which he took over after declining a university education in veterinary medicine.

His transition to organic farming was influenced by personal experiences, including his mother's health issues and an encounter with Sam Mayall, a proponent of organic farming. This change marked a significant shift in his career towards sustainable agriculture and animal welfare advocacy.

Young was known for his campaigns against the misuse of antibiotics in intensive farming, a movement that began in the 1990s. His efforts contributed to the EU's eventual ban on routine farm antibiotic use and the founding of the Alliance to Save Our Antibiotics.

Young was involved with British Organic Farmers and the Organic Growers' Association, and played a key role in developing organic livestock standards for the Soil Association. Young's work was recognized in various media outlets, including BBC Radio 4, and he was a frequent speaker at farming conferences.

At his family's farm, Kite's Nest, Young implemented organic farming practices early on, influencing the sector significantly. His farm was noted for its approach to animal husbandry and biodiversity.

His final work, on the role of grazing animals in sustainable food systems, was published posthumously.

Young died in 2023.
