= Richard B. Young =

American academic (died 1991)

Richard Benjamin Young (died January 21, 1991) was a professor emeritus of English at Smith College.

== Life ==
Young was a graduate of Yale University. Between 1952 and 1961, he worked as an assistant professor. Later, he joined Smith College as a faculty member.

In 1958, his book English Petrarke: A Study of Sidney's 'Astrophel and Stella' was published.

== Bibliography ==
- English Petrarke: A Study of Sidney's 'Astrophel and Stella'
