= Richard Young (footballer) =

English footballer

Personal information
- Full name: Richard H. Young
- Place of birth: Southend-on-Sea, England
- Position: Left half

Senior career*
Years	Team	Apps	(Gls)
- Grays Thurrock
1923	Southend United	1	(0)
- * Club domestic league appearances and goals

Richard H. Young was an English footballer who made one appearance as a left half for Southend United in the Football League. He also played for Grays Thurrock.
