= Cerberus-class monitor =

Class of British monitor ships

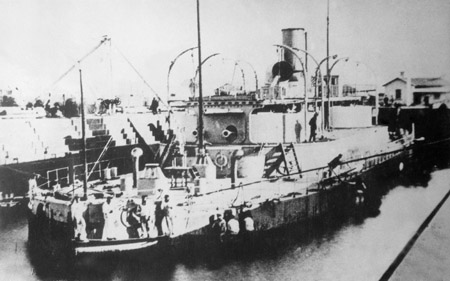
- Stern view of Cerberus at Williamstown, Victoria in 1871

Class overview
- Builders: Thames Ironworks; Palmers Shipbuilding & Iron Co.
- Operators: Royal Navy; Royal Australian Navy
- Built: 1867–1870
- In commission: 1870–1924
- Completed: 2

General characteristics
- Displacement: 3,344 long tons (3,398 t)
- Length: 225 ft (69 m)
- Beam: 45 ft (14 m)
- Draught: 15 ft 4 in (4.67 m)
- Propulsion: 2 shaft Maudslay, 1,360 ihp (Cerberus); 2 shaft Ravenhill 1,436 ihp, (Magdala)
- Speed: 9.75 knots (11 mph; 18 km/h) (Cerberus); 10.6 knots (12 mph; 20 km/h) (Magdala)
- Complement: 155
- Armament: 4 × 10-inch (254 mm) (2 × 2) Rifled Muzzle Loading guns
- Armour: Belt: 6–8 in (150–200 mm) with 9–11 in (230–280 mm) wood backing; Turret: 9–10 in (230–250 mm); Breastworks: 8–9 in (200–230 mm); Deck: 1–1.5 in (25–38 mm)

The Cerberus-class breastwork monitor was a pair of breastwork monitors built for the Royal Navy in the 1860s.

== Design ==
Also referred to as "ironclads" and "turret ships", the ships of the Cerberus class were designed by Sir Edward Reed following requests by several dominions and colonies of the British Empire for warships to be used as coastal defence ships. The class consisted of two ships: HMS Cerberus, which was operated by the colony of Victoria, and HMS Magdala, which spent her life operating in Bombay Harbour.

The size of the ships was limited by cost. They were designed and built to be used as local defence ships, and it was not expected that they would ever need to be deployed far away from their bases. It was therefore possible to design them without sails or rigging and dependent only upon their engines, with a resulting limitation in their effective range.

The absence of masts and rigging allowed more weight to be worked into the ship's armour. This also meant it was possible to arm the ships with two gun turrets, one fore and one aft, which had wholly unobstructed fields of fire over the bow and stern, and on wide arcs amidships. The turrets were mounted on the upper deck and hence had a greater height above water and a correspondingly greater command than guns mounted on the main deck. The turret armament provided an additional advantage of allowing the ships to have a low freeboard. This increased the steadiness of the ship and allowed the hull armour to be applied more thickly over a more limited height of exposed hull.

The Cerberus class inspired the design of the Royal Navy's 1870s Devastation-class ironclad and the French Navy's Tonnerre-class and Tempête-class ironclads of the same period.

== Construction ==
Ship	Builder	Laid down	Launched	Completed	Fate
HMVS Cerberus	Palmers, Jarrow	1 September 1867	2 December 1868	September 1870	Scuttled as breakwater, 26 July 1924
HMS Magdala	Thames Ironworks, Blackwall, London	6 October 1868	2 March 1870	November 1870	Sold, 1903

== Ships ==
- HMVS Cerberus- harbour defence vessel at Melbourne, Australia
- HMS Magdala – harbour defence vessel at Bombay, India

== See also ==
- HMS Abyssinia – harbour defence vessel at Bombay, India, built to a similar, but smaller, design.

== Bibliography ==
- Archibald, E.H.H. (1971). The Metal Fighting Ship in the Royal Navy 1860–1970. Arco Publishing Co. ISBN 0-668-02509-3.
- Brown, David K. (1997). Warrior to Dreadnought: Warship Development 1860–1905. Chatham Publishing. ISBN 1-86176-022-1.
- Colledge, J. J.; Warlow, Ben (2006) [1969]. Ships of the Royal Navy: The Complete Record of All Fighting Ships of the Royal Navy from the 15th Century to the Present (3rd Rev ed.). London: Chatham Publishing. ISBN 978-1-86176-281-8. OCLC 67375475.
- Friedman, Norman (2018). British Battleships of the Victorian Era. Naval Institute Press. ISBN 978-1-68247-329-0.
- Fuller, Howard J. (December 2005). ""A portentous spectacle": The Monitor U.S.S. Miantonomoh Visits England" (PDF). International Journal of Naval History. 4 (3). Archived from the original (PDF) on 23 July 2008.
- Parkes, Oscar (1990) [1966]. British Battleships, Warrior 1860 to Vanguard 1950: A History of Design, Construction, and Armament (New & rev. ed.). Naval Institute Press. ISBN 1-55750-075-4.
- Roberts, John (1979). "Great Britain (including Empire Forces)". In Chesneau, Roger & Kolesnik, Eugene M. (eds.). Conway's All the World's Fighting Ships 1860–1905. New York: Mayflower Books. pp. 1–113. ISBN 0-8317-0302-4.
