= New Australasian Gold Mine disaster =

1882 incident in Creswick, Victoria, Australia

Coordinates: 37°23′42″S 143°52′12″E

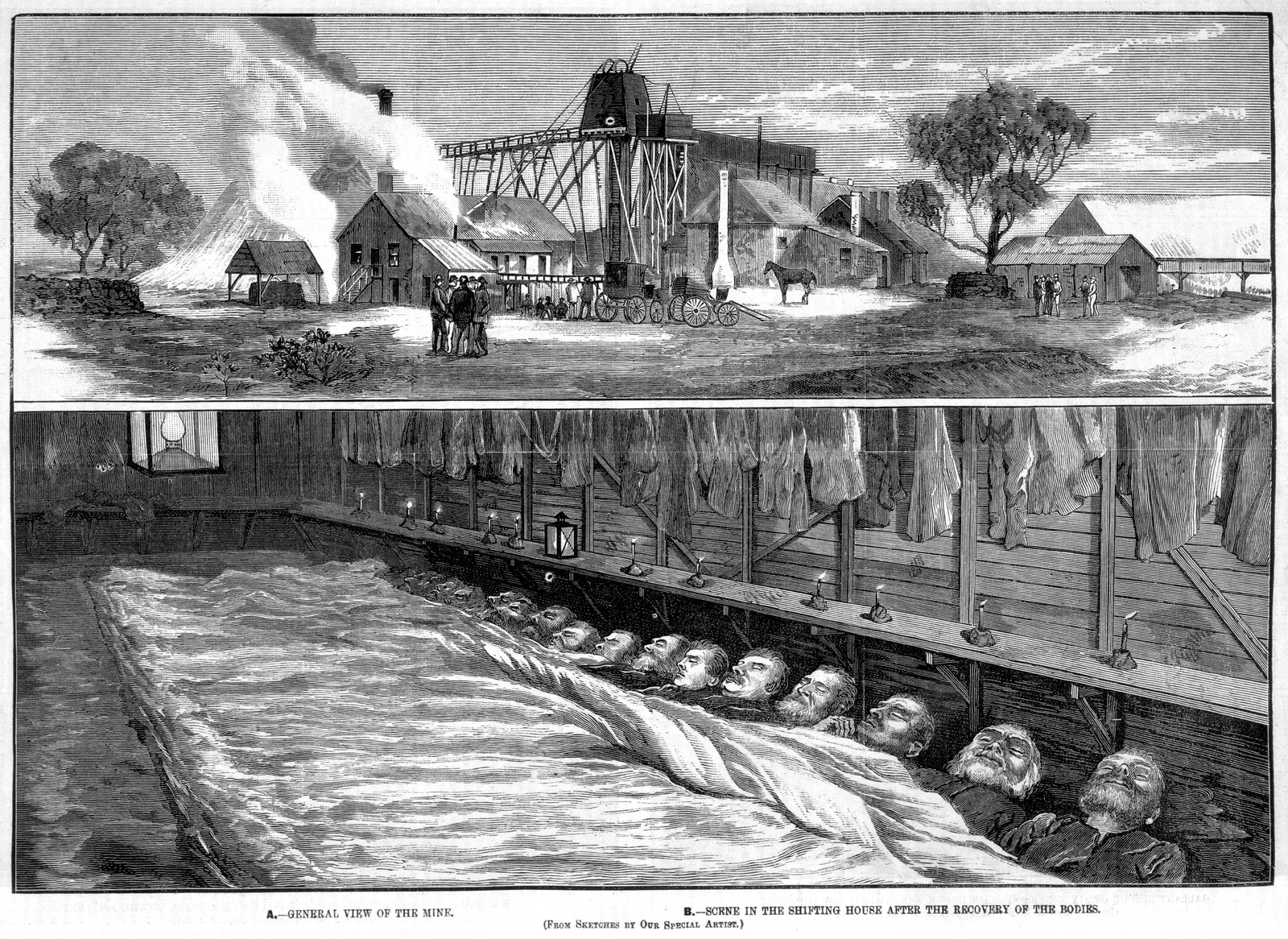
Sketch of the Creswick Mining Disaster in The Age, 23 December 1882

The New Australasian No.2 Deep Lead Gold Mine, was a goldmine located in Creswick, Victoria, Australia, that is now infamous for being Australia's worst below-ground gold mining disaster.

Deep lead alluvial deposits of gold to the north of Creswick were worked following the sands and gravels of ancient rivers that were deeply buried by later volcanic activity. Water presented a challenge in these deep lead mines like Australasian No.2 because it saturated the river beds where the gold lay, and had to be drained or pumped out before miners could start work.

At 5.30am, Tuesday 12 December 1882, 27 miners became trapped underground by an inrush of flood waters that came from the flooded parallel-sunk No.1 mine shaft. Despite two days of frantic pumping and bailing of the floodwater and with other equipment transported from the monitor ship HMVS Cerberus, the waters filled the mine shaft. The trapped men scrawled last notes to their loved ones on billy cans before they drowned. Some of these are kept at the Creswick Museum and still bear the messages. Only five men survived and made it to the surface. Of the men that perished,18 left widows and 63 dependent children.

The funerals took place on 15 December and the procession of 4,000 was about 1.5 miles (2.4 km) long between the mine and Creswick cemetery. 15,000 mourners lined the funeral route. Many of the victims were originally from Cornwall or of Cornish ancestry. Shortly after the accident approximately £20,000 had been raised for the relief fund.

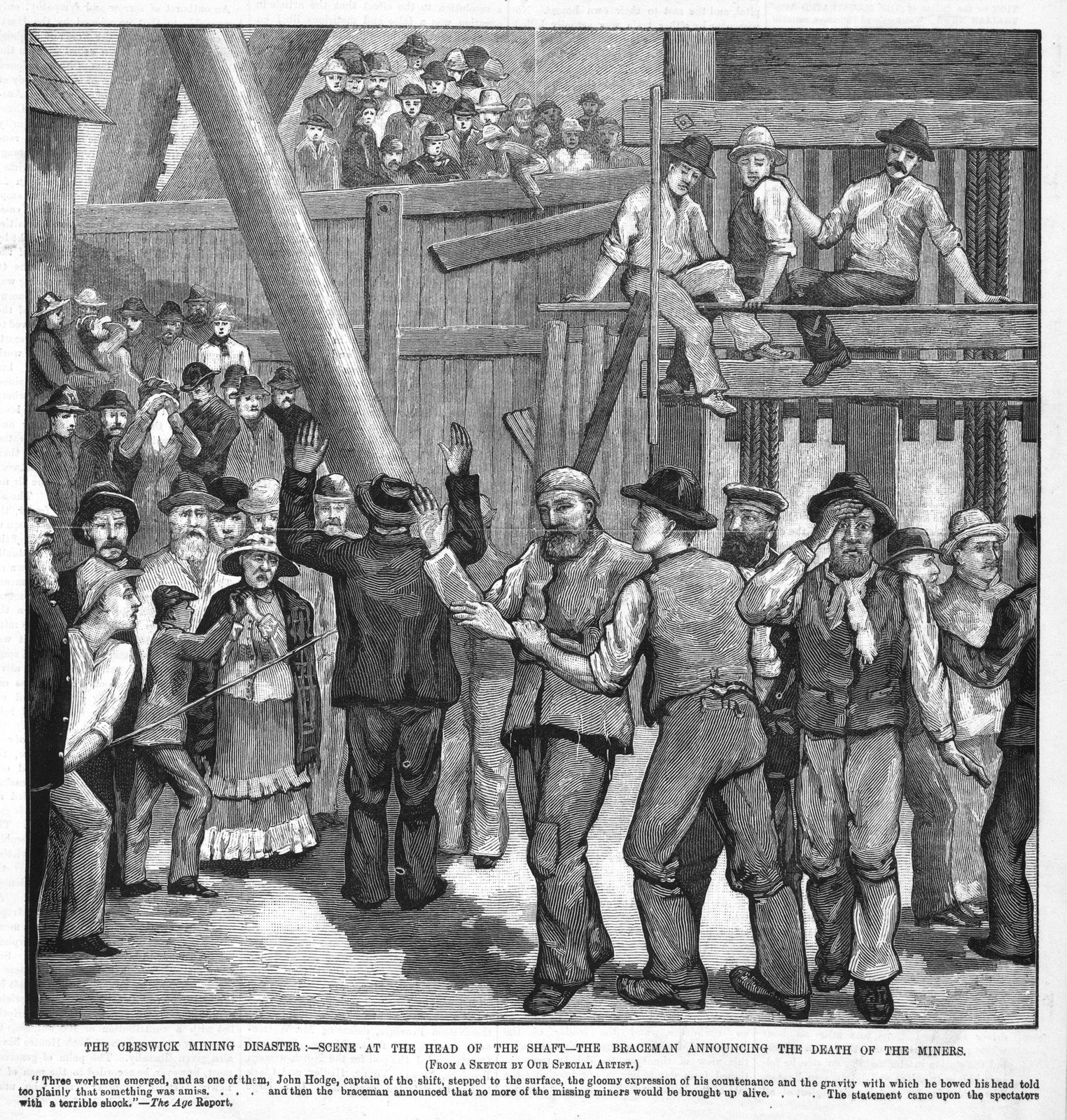
Sketch of the braceman announcing the deaths of the miners in The Age, 23 December 1882

In 1982, the Premier of Victoria, John Cain unveiled The New Australasian No.2 Deep Lead Gold Mining Memorial, which relates the story on a plaque. In 2007 a further plaque was unveiled at the mine site for the 125th Anniversary along with an avenue of 22 oak trees., one for each miner who died in the disaster. The site is listed on the Victorian Heritage Register.
