= HMS Magdala =

Cerberus-class breastwork monitor of the Royal Navy

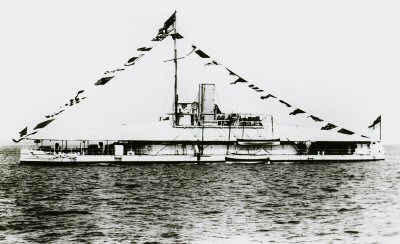
- Magdala with awnings rigged

History

United Kingdom
- Name: Magdala
- Namesake: Battle of Magdala
- Builder: Thames Ironworks & Shipbuilding Company
- Laid down: 6 October 1868
- Launched: 2 March 1870
- Completed: November 1870
- Fate: Broken up, 1904

General characteristics
- Class & type: Cerberus-class breastwork monitor
- Displacement: 3,340 long tons (3,390 t)
- Length: 225 ft (68.6 m) (p/p)
- Beam: 45 ft (13.7 m)
- Draught: 15 ft 3 in (4.6 m)
- Installed power: 1,436 ihp (1,071 kW)
- Propulsion: 2 shafts, 2 steam engines
- Speed: 10 knots (19 km/h; 12 mph)
- Range: 450 nmi (830 km; 520 mi) at 10 kn (19 km/h; 12 mph)
- Complement: 155
- Armament: 2 × twin 10-inch rifled muzzle loaders
- Armour: Belt: 6–8 in (152–203 mm); Deck: 1–1.5 in (25–38 mm); Superstructures: 8–9 in (203–229 mm); Gun turret: 9–10 in (229–254 mm)

HMS Magdala was a Cerberus-class breastwork monitor of the Royal Navy, built specifically to serve as a coastal defence ship for the harbour of Bombay (now Mumbai) in the late 1860s. She was ordered by the India Office for the Bombay Marine. The original specifications were thought to be too expensive and a cheaper design was ordered. While limited to harbour defence duties, the breastwork monitors were described by Admiral George Alexander Ballard as being like "full-armoured knights riding on donkeys, easy to avoid but bad to close with." Aside from gunnery practice Magdala remained in Bombay Harbour for her entire career. The ship was sold for scrap in 1903.

== Design and description ==
In July 1866 the India Office asked for two floating batteries to defend Bombay and the Controller of the Navy, Vice Admiral Spencer Robinson recommended that monitors be used. He recommended a design with 12-inch (305 mm) armour belt and 15 inches (381 mm) protecting the gun turret, armed with the largest possible guns, which would cost £220,000. The India Office thought that this was too expensive and ordered a repeat of HMVS Cerberus instead for only £132,400.

The ships had a length between perpendiculars of 225 feet (68.6 m), a beam of 45 feet (13.7 m), and a draught of 15 feet 3 inches (4.65 m) at deep load. They displaced 3,340 long tons (3,390 t). Their crew consisted of 155 officers and men.

=== Propulsion ===
Magdala had two horizontal direct-acting steam engines, made by Ravenhill, each driving a single propeller. The ship's boilers had a working pressure of 30 psi (207 kPa; 2 kgf/cm^{2}). The engines produced a total of 1,369 indicated horsepower (1,021 kW) on 21 October 1870 during the ship's sea trials which gave her a maximum speed of 10.67 knots (19.76 km/h; 12.28 mph). Magdala carried 220 long tons (220 t) of coal, enough to steam 450 nmi (830 km; 520 mi) at 10 kn (19 km/h; 12 mph).

=== Armament ===
The Cerberus-class ships mounted a pair of 10-inch rifled muzzle-loading guns in each hand-worked turret. The shell of the 10-inch (254 mm) gun weighed 407 pounds (184.6 kg) while the gun itself weighed 18 long tons (18 t). The gun had a muzzle velocity of 1,365 ft/s (416 m/s) and was credited with the ability to penetrate a nominal 12.9 inches (330 mm) of wrought iron armour at 100 yards (91 m). The guns could fire both solid shot and explosive shells. Magdala was rearmed in 1892 with four breech-loading BL 8-inch guns.

=== Armour ===
The Cerberus-class ships had a complete wrought iron waterline belt that was 8 inches (203 mm) thick amidships and thinned to 6 inches (152 mm) at the ends. The superstructure and conning tower were fully armoured, the reason it was called a breastwork, with 8–9 inches (203–229 mm) of wrought iron. The gun turrets had 10 inches (250 mm) on their faces and 9 inches (230 mm) on the sides and rear. All of the vertical armour was backed by 9–11 inches (229–279 mm) of teak. The decks were 1.5 inches (38.1 mm) thick, backed by 10 inches (250 mm) of teak.

== Service ==
HMS Magdala was laid down on 6 October 1868 by the Thames Ironworks in Leamouth, London. She was launched on 2 March 1870 and completed in November 1870. For her delivery voyage to India, Magdala was fitted with three temporary masts and made the trip under sail in the middle of winter without escort, as both her builders and the Royal Navy, considered her sufficiently seaworthy as to make the trip safely. Her life thereafter was wholly spent in Bombay Harbour, with occasional short trips to sea for firing practice. She was sold for scrap in January 1903.
