= J & W Dudgeon =

Ship manufacturer in London, England

Coordinates: 51.49228°N 0.00419°W

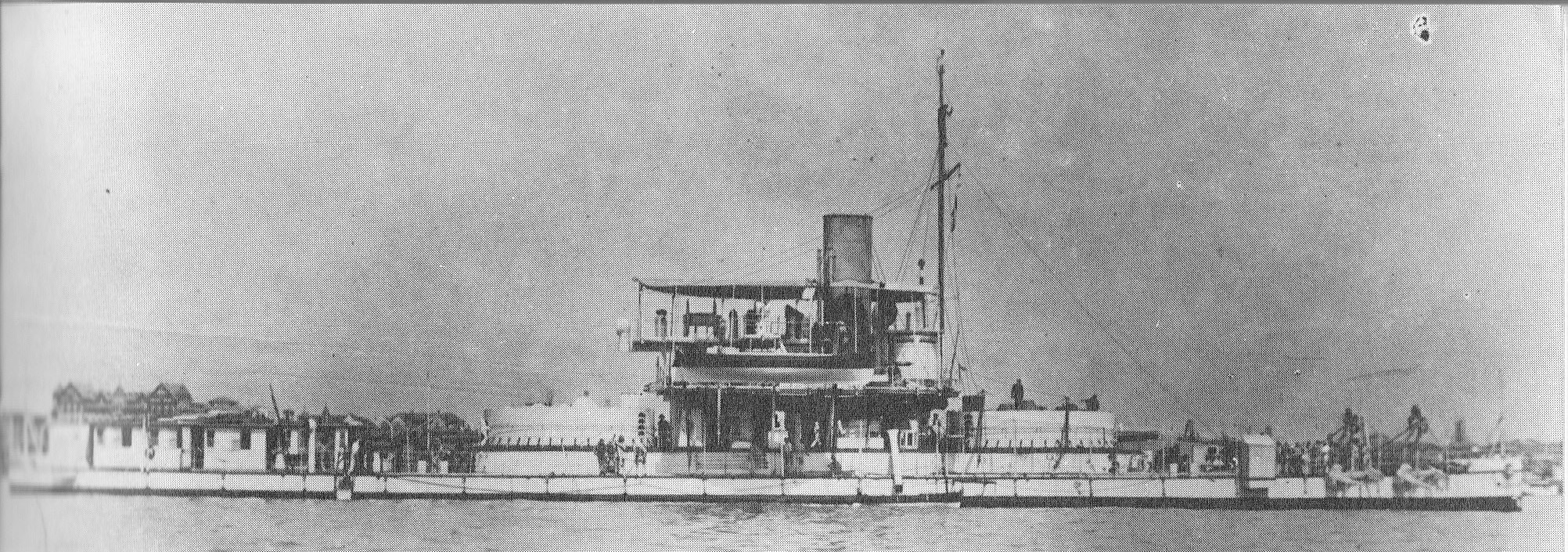
HMS Abyssinia

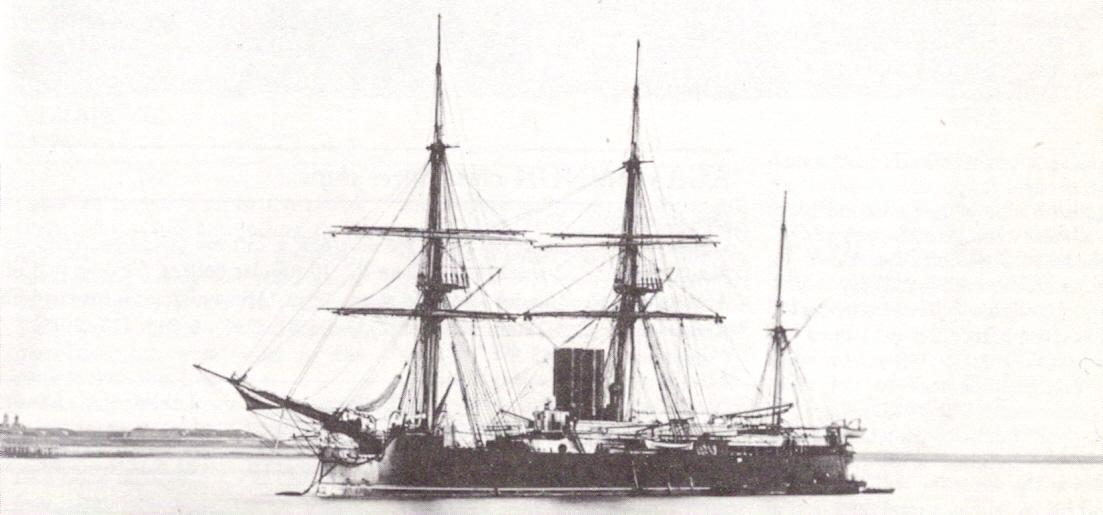
Masted turret ship HMS Neptune

J & W Dudgeon was a Victorian shipbuilding and engineering company based in Cubitt Town, London, founded by John and William Dudgeon.

John and William Dudgeon had established the Sun Iron Works in Millwall in the 1850s, and had a reputation for advanced marine engines. In 1862 they set up as shipbuilders at a yard to the south of Cubitt Town Pier. They initially specialised in building blockade runners for the American Civil War, at times employing up to 1500 men.

The yard, with 344 feet (105 m) of river frontage, stretched nearly 600 feet (180 m) inland to Manchester Road. The first ship built there was the 150-foot Flora, the first twin-screw steamer to cross the Atlantic Ocean. The firm survived the 1866 crash of Overend Gurney, with enough orders to take over the disused yard to the south in 1869. This gave a combined river frontage of 500 feet (150 m).

In 1874 the company was severely damaged by the bungled launching of the large warship Independencia for the Brazilian government, repairs and refitting eventually being done by Samuda Brothers, just down the river. The ship was eventually acquired by the Royal Navy, as HMS Neptune. William Dudgeon died in 1875 and the yard closed. John Dudgeon was subsequently judged to be 'of unsound mind' and was admitted to an asylum in Edinburgh.

By 1882 the site had become an oil storage wharf, with tanks below ground level. By 1913 it had 27 oil storage tanks with a combined capacity of over 14,000 tons. It remained in this use until the 1960s, by which time it had nearly 100 tanks, some of 20,000 gallons.

In 1969 an explosion in an oil storage tank being demolished at the site (then known as Dudgeon's wharf) killed five firemen.

The site was later developed for housing and is known as Compass Point.

== Ships ==
Ship	GRT	Yard No	Date of Launch
SS Flora	305		25 September 1862
Annie	370		1863
Coya	515		August 1863
Apelles	1030		6 May 1863
Dee	324		1863
Kate	477		1863
Vesta	370		1863
Ceres	374		1863
Don	390		23 May 1863
Hebe	449	9	1863
SS Far East	1259		31 October 1863
SS Experiment			1863
SS Edith	537		1864
Atalanta	380		1864
PS Avalon	614		26 March 1864
PS Zealous	613		23 April 1864
SS Run Her	481		1864
SS Rattlesnake	432		1864
SS Virginia	614		1864
SS Louisa Ann Fanny	680		1865
SS Mary	902		1865
SS Ruahine	1504		March 1865
SS John Wells	393		1865
SS Mary Augusta	680		1865
SS Ravensbury	666		23 May 1864
SS Handig Vlug	138		1865
SS Bolivar	933		1866
SS Zeeland			16 June 1866
SS George Reed	170		1866
SS Thames	103		1866
SS Liguria	198	60	28 July 1866
SS Henda	143		1867
SS Assunta	143		1867
HMS Viper	1228		21 December 1867
SS Eugenie	143		18 April 1867
SS Spindrift	171		1869
SS Conchita	181		1869
SS Manuelita	505		1869
SS Pepita	181		1869
SS PO	1698		June 1870
SS Eleanor	1698		August 1870
SS Italo-Platense	1698		30 December 1869
SS Plemmtannikov			1870
SS Aleksey			1870
HMS Abyssinia	2900		19 February 1870
SS La Pampa	1698	75	4 April 1870
SS King Masaba	281		1871
SS Lulio	670		13 October 1870
HMS Hecate	3480		30 September 1871
PS Richard Young	718		1871
SS Salgir	498		July 1872
SS Pasages	791		28 May 1872
SS Fair Penang	105		1872
SS Tenasserim	2570		20 April 1872
SS Khoper	861		November 1872
SS Alma	498		September 1872
SS Gauthiod	730		1873
SS Union	245		March 1873
SS Enterprise	604		April 1873
SS Chatham	278		1873
SS Svithiod	734		June 1873
SS Santander	2213	103	13 December 1872
SS Langkat	276		November 1874
SS Brahestad	233		May 1874
SS Calais	309		1874
SS South Western	657		12 September 1874
SS Guernsey	545	121	31 January 1874
SS The Miner			1874
SS Duckenfield	368	131	15 May 1875
HMS Neptune	9310		10 September 1874
