= George Swinnock =

17th-century English clergyman

George Swinnock (1627–1673) was an English nonconformist clergyman and writer.

== Early life ==
Swinnock was born at Maidstone in Kent in 1627, the son of George Swinnock of Maidstone, whose father was mayor of the borough. Owing to the death of his father, George Swinnock, jun., was brought up in the house of his uncle Robert, a zealous puritan. He was educated at Emmanuel College, Cambridge, whence he removed on 7 October 1645 to Jesus College (Addit. MS. 5820, f. 162); he graduated B.A. in 1647–8, and then proceeded to Oxford to obtain preferment, entering as a commoner at Magdalen Hall.

== Church career ==
On 19 January 1648–9 Swinnock became chaplain at New College, and on 6 October following he was made a fellow of Balliol College by the parliamentary visitors. He was incorporated B.A. on 29 November 1650, and graduated M.A. on the next day. In the same year he resigned his fellowship, and was appointed vicar of Rickmansworth in Hertfordshire.

In 1655 he was appointed to St. Leonard's chapel at Aston Clinton in Buckinghamshire, and on 10 January 1661 was presented to the vicarage of Great Kimble in the same county by Richard Hampden, to whom he was then chaplain. In the following year he was ejected for nonconformity, both from St. Leonard's and from Great Kimble, and took up his abode with the Hampden family at Great Hampden.

Upon the issue of the Declaration of Indulgence in 1672 he retired to Maidstone, where he became pastor to a large congregation. He died on 10 November 1673, and was buried in the parish church. He was survived by his wife and nine children.

Swinnock has been described as "a man of good abilities, and a serious, warm, and practical preacher."

== Writings ==
Swinnock was the author of:

- The Door of Salvation Opened, London, 1660, 8vo and 4to; 3rd edition, 1671.
- The Christian Man's Calling, London, 1661–5, 4to.
- Heaven and Hell Epitomised, London, 1659, 8vo.
- The Incomparableness of God, London, 1672, 4to.
- The Sinner's last Sentence, London, 1675, 8vo.
- Life of Thomas Wilson, 1672, 8vo.

A collective edition of Swinnock's 'Works' was published in 1665, London, 4to, containing "The Christian Man's Calling" and "Heaven and Hell Epitomised", as well as several shorter treatises and sermons. This five volume set of Swinnock's works is now made available by Banner of Truth Trust.
