= PS Zealous =

History
- Name: PS Zealous
- Operator: Great Eastern Railway
- Port of registry: (United Kingdom)
- Builder: J & W Dudgeon of London
- Launched: 23 April 1864
- Out of service: 1887
- Fate: Scrapped

General characteristics
- Tonnage: 613 gross register tons (GRT)
- Length: 230 feet (70 m)
- Beam: 27.1 feet (8.3 m)
- Depth: 11.7 feet (3.6 m)

PS Zealous was a passenger vessel built for the Great Eastern Railway in 1864.

== History ==
The ship was built by the J & W Dudgeon of Cubitt Town, London for the Great Eastern Railway and launched on 23 April 1864. She was launched by Miss Alice Goodson, eldest daughter of the chairman of the Great Eastern Railway Company. Zealous was the first of a trio of new vessels, and inaugurated the GER's passenger services from Harwich to both Rotterdam and Antwerp in 1865, later joined by Avalon and Ravensbury.

Zealous was altered in 1866 to carry cargo as well as passengers, and she was re-boilered in 1873. On 8 August 1875, she ran aground at Harwich, then refloated. She was withdrawn from service in 1887 and broken up.
