= PS Richard Young =

History
- Name: 1871–1890: Richard Young; 1890–1905: Brandon
- Operator: Great Eastern Railway
- Port of registry: (United Kingdom)
- Builder: J & W Dudgeon, Cubitt Town, London
- Launched: 1871
- Out of service: 1905
- Fate: Scrapped 1905

General characteristics
- Tonnage: 1871–1890: 668 gross register tons (GRT); 1890–1905: 718 gross register tons (GRT)
- Length: 1871–1890: 239.8 feet (73.1 m); 1890–1905: 245 feet (75 m)
- Beam: 27 feet (8.2 m)
- Depth: 13.5 feet (4.1 m)

PS Richard Young was a passenger vessel built for the Great Eastern Railway in 1871.

== History ==
The ship was built by J & W Dudgeon in Cubitt Town London for the Great Eastern Railway and added to the fleet in 1871.

Named after a director of the railway company, she was used for their Harwich to Rotterdam and Antwerp services.

In 1890 she was converted from paddle steamer to screw steamer by Earle's Shipbuilding and afterwards known as Brandon.

She was scrapped in 1905.
