= Gracie (pilot boat) =

Pilot boat

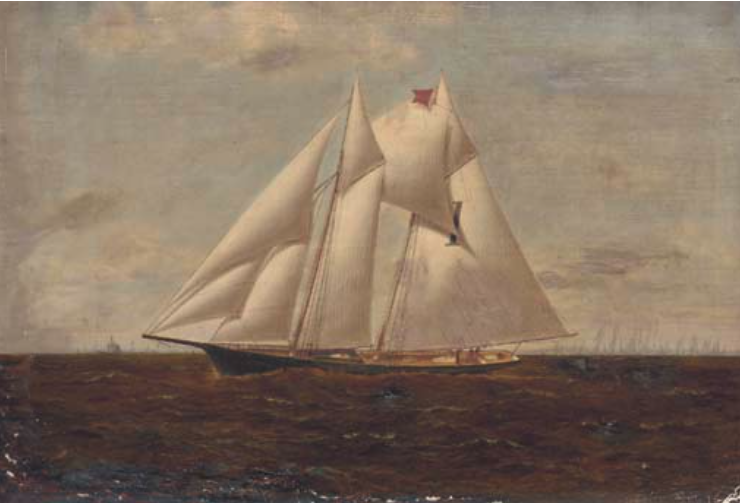
- Pilot boat Gracie, No. 1, painting by Conrad Freitag.

History

United States
- Name: Gracie
- Owner: C. A. Hayden
- Operator: Abel F. Hayden
- Builder: Edward A. Costigan
- Acquired: Wilmington, North Carolina pilots
- In service: 1869
- Out of service: October 4, 1898
- Home port: Port of Boston
- Fate: went ashore

General characteristics
- Tonnage: 40-tons TM
- Length: 65 ft 2 in (19.86 m)
- Beam: 19 ft 2 in (5.84 m)
- Depth: 6 ft 8 in (2.03 m)
- Propulsion: schooner sail
- Sail plan: Schooner-rigged
- Complement: not known

Gracie was a 19th-century Boston pilot boat built in 1869 at the Edward A. Costigan shipyard in Charlestown, Massachusetts. The schooner was used by Boston pilots and was sold to North Carolina pilots in 1881.

== Construction and service ==
The Boston pilot boat Gracie was built by Boston shipbuilder Edward A. Costigan in Charlestown, Massachusetts in 1869. He also built the pilot boat Pet, No. 9.

The ship Independent from a foreign port, collided with the pilot boat Gracie in the Boston harbor on October 19, 1879. She was damaged for $500 in repairs.

Gracie was registered as a Schooner with the Record of American and Foreign Shipping from 1881 to 1898. Her ship master was Captain Abel F. Hayden; her owner was C. A. Hayden; built in 1869 at Charlestown, Massachusetts; and her hailing port was the Port of Boston. Her dimensions were 65.2 ft. in length; 19.2 ft. breadth of beam; 6.8 ft. depth of hold; and 40-tons Tonnage.

== Sold to the North Carolina pilots ==
Gracie was sold to the Wilmington, North Carolina pilots on December 22, 1881. The pilot boat D. J. Lawlor was purchased by the Boston pilots to take the place of the Gracie. Her port did not change to Wilmington, North Carolina until 1886.

On November 21, 1883, the pilot boat Gracie came across the steam yacht Mermaid from New Haven, Connecticut, bound for Jacksonville, Florida, anchored off Frying Pan Shoals full of water. The crew had left the yacht and was taken safely on board the light ship. She took the crew off the light ship and towed the yacht safely into Smithville, North Carolina.

In 1884, Conrad Freitag painted a picture of the pilot boat Gracie, which was oil on canvas.

On October 14, 1886, the pilot boat Gracie was cruising off the Cape Fear bar off the coast of North Carolina when she sighted a steamer signaling for a pilot. In rough weather, three men left the Gracie in a yawl that capsized before reaching the vessel. The men were rescued by the pilot boat but Charlie St. George almost sank before being able to catch a rope and be pulled on board.

== End of service ==
On October 4, 1898, the pilot boat Gracie went ashore off the Georgia coast.

== See also ==
- List of Northeastern U. S. Pilot Boats
