= Abel F. Hayden =

Boston Pilot

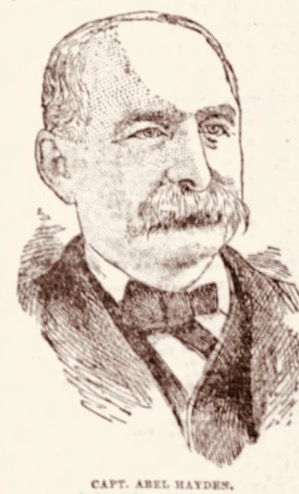
- Abel F. Hayden, c. 1889.
- Born: September 12, 1835; Boston, Massachusetts, US
- Died: April 11, 1899 (aged 63); Port Townsend, Washington, US
- Occupation: harbor pilot
- Spouse: Emily A. Mayo
- Children: 2

Abel F. Hayden, (September 12, 1835 – April 11, 1889) was a 19th-century American Maritime pilot. He helped bring in the USS San Jacinto, into the Boston Harbor in 1861. Hayden was owner of the pilot-boat D. J. Lawlor, that was struck by a fishing schooner Horace B. Parker, in 1895.

== Early life ==
Hayden was born on September 12, 1835, in Boston, Massachusetts. His father was Abel T. Hayden, a pilot in the Boston Harbor and original owner of the Pet, No. 9. His mother was Caroline A. Beck, daughter of Captain Charles A. Beck keeper of the Long Island Head Light. He was married and had two sons.

== Career ==
Hayden started in the pilot business in 1853, piloting packet boats to and from Cohasset, Massachusetts. He piloted the Neponset River from Milton Lower Falls down to the ship channel. He was boatkeeper for the Coynette.

In 1858, Hayden received his commission to pilot vessels in Boston Harbor and Massachusetts Bay. He joined the pilot-boat William Starkey, No. 2, and was in command of the pilot-boats Phantom, Friend, Haze, Clarence Barclay, Edwin Forrest, Pet, and Gracie.

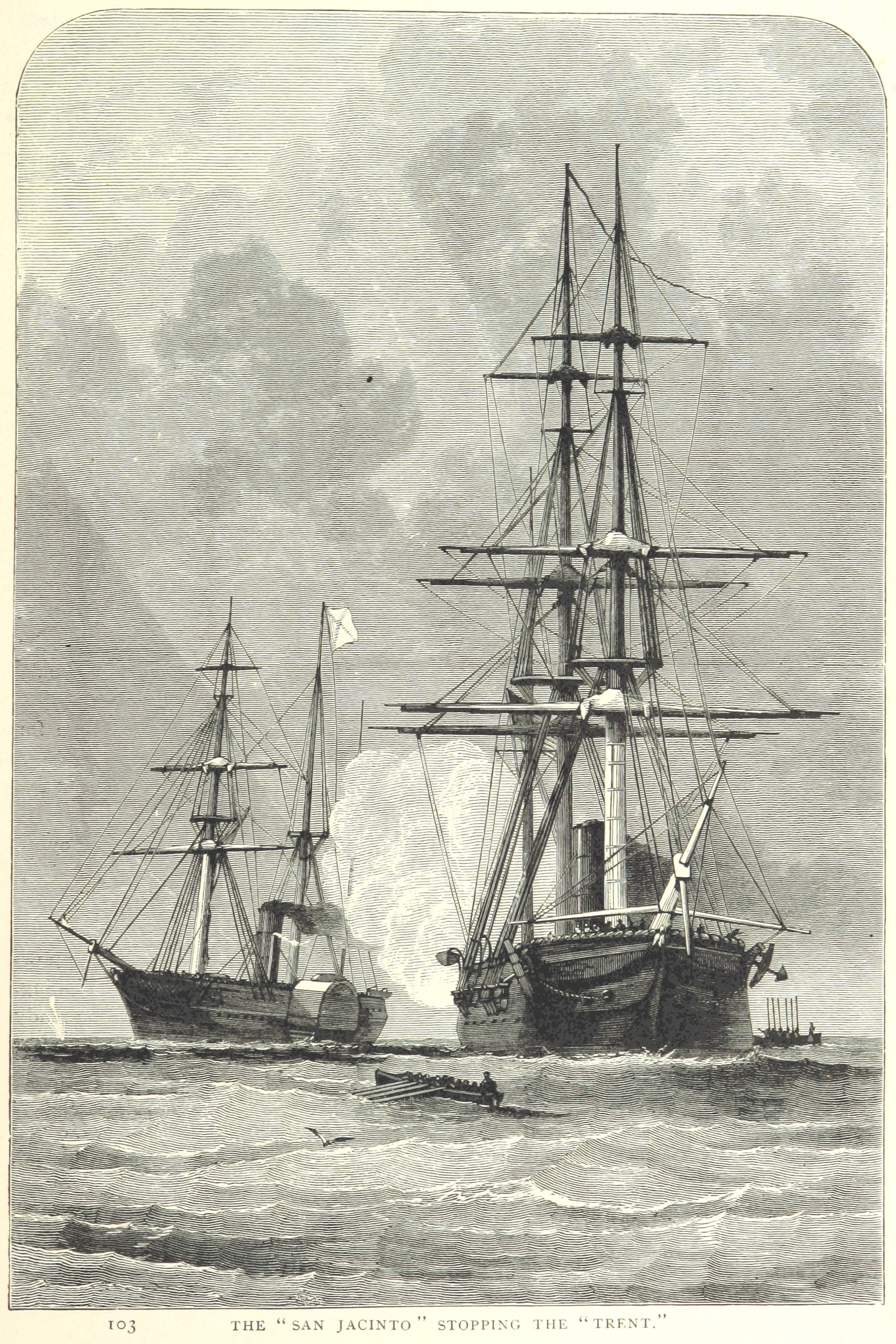
Hayden anchored the San Jacinto in the Boston channel.

In November 1861, during the American Civil War, Hayden was dispatched by the government to Newport, Rhode Island, to bring the steamer San Jacinto to Boston. On board were two Confederate diplomats James Murray Mason and John Slidell who were taken from a British mail packet RMS Trent. Captain Hayden anchored the San Jacinto in the channel, and the two men were moved to Fort Warren. They were then released on New Year's Day, 1862, and taken to Provincetown, Massachusetts, to board HMS Rinaldo for passage to London. The incident strained United States relations with Britain and came to be known as the Trent Affair.

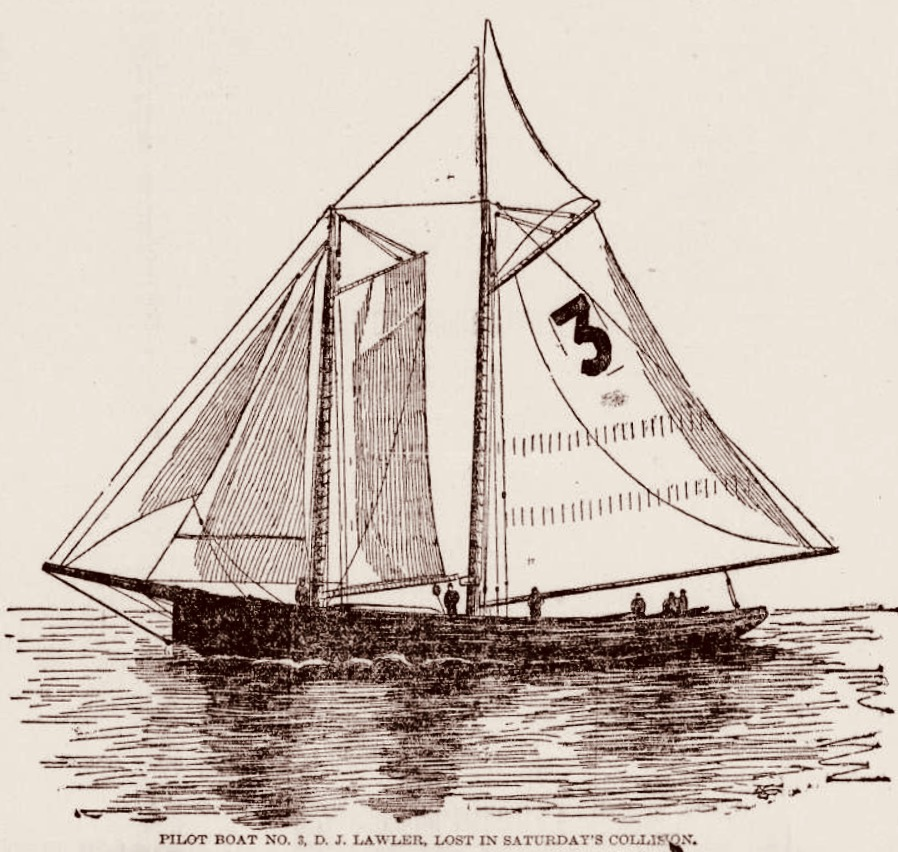
Pilot Boat D. J. Lawlor, No. 3

His last service was on the pilot-boat D. J. Lawlor, No. 3, in 1882, which he was the principal owner. Hayden was one-third owner of the Lawlor, along with James H. Reid and William V. Abbott. Hayden was the boat master.

After the Lawlor was lost in the collision with the fishing schooner Horace B. Parker in 1895, he retired. On the advice of his doctor, he moved with his wife and two sons to the Pacific coast.

== Death ==
Hayden died on April 11, 1899, in Port Townsend, Washington. He was one of the oldest Boston pilots, serving for over thirty years.

== See also ==
- List of Northeastern U. S. Pilot Boats
