= William Starkey =

William Starkey may refer to:

- William Starkey (pilot boat), a pilot boat in Boston Harbor
- William Starkey, one of the founders of the Boston Marine Society
- Billy Starkey, character in The Stand
- Bill Starkey, co-founder of Kiss Army, the official fan club for the American rock band Kiss
