= Edward Costigan =

Edward Costigan may refer to:

- Edward P. Costigan, U.S. senator from Colorado
- Edward A. Costigan, Boston, Massachusetts shipbuilder
