= Coquette (pilot boat) =

Boston Pilot boat

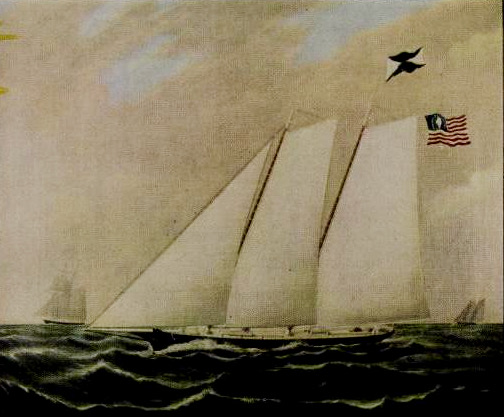
- The Coquette, Yacht and Pilot Boat, painted by C. Drew.

History

United States
- Name: Coquette
- Namesake: bark Coquette
- Owner: James A. Perkins, a yachtsmen
- Operator: Elbridge Gerry Martin
- Builder: Louis Winde
- Launched: 1846
- Out of service: October 5, 1867

General characteristics
- Class & type: schooner
- Tonnage: 80-tons burthen
- Length: 66 ft 5 in (20.24 m)
- Beam: 19 ft 0 in (5.79 m)
- Draft: 8 ft 0 in (2.44 m)
- Depth: 7 ft 0 in (2.13 m)
- Propulsion: Sail (yacht)
- Sail plan: 77 ft 0 in (23.47 m) mainmast; 74 ft 5 in (22.68 m) foremast
- Notes: Two staterooms, six berths, cook room, water-tanks, closets; four berths in the forecastle

The Coquette was a 19th-century yacht and pilot boat, built in 1845 by Louis Winde, at the Winde & Clinkard shipyard in Chelsea, Massachusetts for yachtsmen James A. Perkins. Her design was based on a model by shipbuilder Dennison J. Lawlor. The Coquette was a good example of an early American yacht with a clipper bow. As a yacht, she won the attention for outsailing the larger New York yacht Maria at the second New York Yacht Club regatta in 1846. Perkins sold the Coquette to the Boston Pilots' Association for pilot service in 1848. She continued as a pilot boat until 1867 when she was sold as a Blackbirder to be used on the African coast.

== Construction and service ==
The Boston two-masted, keel schooner rigged yacht Coquette was built in 1845 by an early Swedish yacht designer and shipbuilder Louis Winde, for yachtsmen James A. Perkins; also known as "Jim" Perkins. She was launched ion March 27, 1846 from the Winde, Clinkard & Co. shipyard in Chelsea, Massachusetts. The Coquette was an example of an early American yacht with a clipper bow. Her unique design was later used by George Steers, best known for the famous racing yacht America. The Coquette was named for a 420-ton boat built in 1844 at East Boston by Samuel Hall for the Perkins family. Her dimensions were 66 ft. in length on deck; 19 ft. breadth of beam; 7 ft. depth of hold; and 80-tons burthen.

The Coquette was built based on the design of a half-model of the Coquette made by shipbuilder Dennison J. Lawlor. Lawlor, as young man, was employed in the Winde and Clinkard shipyard.

On July 22, 1846, James A. Perkins sailed the Coquette from Boston to New York, which was 284 miles between the two cities. She was in the second Regatta sponsored by the New York Yacht Club. Perkins made a challenge for the yacht Coquette to sail any vessel that was a member of the New York Yacht Club for a $500 stake. Commodore John C. Stevens, of the centerboard sloop rigged yacht Maria, of New York accepted the challenge. Boston yacht Northern Light was the leeward stakeout on the course. The race was on October 10, 1846, from the Sandy Hook bar 25 miles to sea and back. The Boston skipper on the Coquette was Captain Elbridge Gerry Martin. The Coquette beat the sloop Maria in the match race by five and a half minutes.

=== Pilot boat ===
Perkins retired from yachting and the yacht Coquette was put up for sale on May 10, 1848. Perkins sold the yacht Coquette to Captain Elbridge Martin and Captain Samuel Colby and was converted for the Boston pilot service. She was operational for 18 years. As a pilot boat, she got her spars from David Sears of Boston.

On March 3, 1849, the pilot boat Coquette was off Cape May, New Jersey when it discovered a capsized schooner Thomas Le Russell floating bottom up. Some of the crew went to the vessel and discovered that there were five men trapped inside still alive. In the attempt to rescue the men, the boat filled with water and sank with the five men trapped inside.

In 1851, the pilot boat Coquette received damage when she, in a storm, ran into the brig Georgiana, off Nantucket, Massachusetts. Her sails were blown away and she went ashore on the flats at South Boston.

Artist Alfred Waud did a marine pencil drawing of the Boston Pilot Boat Fleet in 1859, which appeared in the Ballou's Pictorial of 1859. The story in the Ballou's Pictorial said:

These boats are all well-built, of exquisite model and crack sailors, and manned by as fine a set of men as ever trod a deck or handled a sheet. They ride the waves like sea-ducks, and with their hardy crews are constantly exposed to the roughest weather.

— Ballou's Pictorial, 1859, Vol. XVI, No. 14.

The drawing lists the schooner-rigged boats with their number on the mainsail. They included the Phantom, No. 5; Syren, No. 1; William Starkey, No 6; the Coquette and the Friend.

On July 2, 1863, during the American Civil War, the Boston pilot boat Coquette No. 6, met up with the US gunboat United States and provided important news about the Confederate cruiser CSS Tacony.

On December 8, 1865, Captain Martin of the Boston pilot boat Coquette at Marblehead, Massachusetts, took on board a cat, which was presented to Captain Martin by a local citizen. When the boat arrived in Lewis Wharf the cat got off and returned to Marblehead, which was 15 miles away.

=== End of service ===
The Boston pilot boat Coquette was sold at auction on October 5, 1867, at the Union Wharf in North End, Boston, as a Blackbirder to be used on the African coast.

== Coquette (Chesapeake Bay) ==
Another Coquette was built by William E. Smith for Joseph Thomas and the Maryland pilots in 1845. She was acquired by the Maryland Association of Pilots from 1852 until 1880.

In December 1857, when the ship Eva Dorothea out of Boston, ran ashore near Cape Henry. The Baltimore, Maryland pilot boat Coquette and the Hampton, Virginia pilot boat Plume rescued over one hundred passengers.

On June 28, 1866, the Baltimore pilot boat Coquette outside of Cape Henry, Virginia collided with the bark Mary Lord. The pilot boat was damaged and was taken in tow by the steamship City of Albany into the harbor for repairs.

By September 1867, the Baltimore pilot boat Coquette was reported cruising off Cape Henry, Virginia, where her pilots boarded the vessels: brig H. Houston, ship Bremmenhauser, brig Chesapeake, brig John Balbo, brig Leander, brig Blue Wave, the Norwegian barque Skiold, brig Unicorn, schooner Mary E. Staples, brig George Latimer, ship Emile and barque Seneca.

By October 1867, the pilot boat Coquette was reported working off the Chesapeake Bay when it picked up the schooner John Speddin, from Norfolk for Baltimore with a load of lumber.

== See also ==
- List of Northeastern U. S. Pilot Boats
