= Phantom (pilot boat) =

Sandy Hook pilot boat (1867–1888)

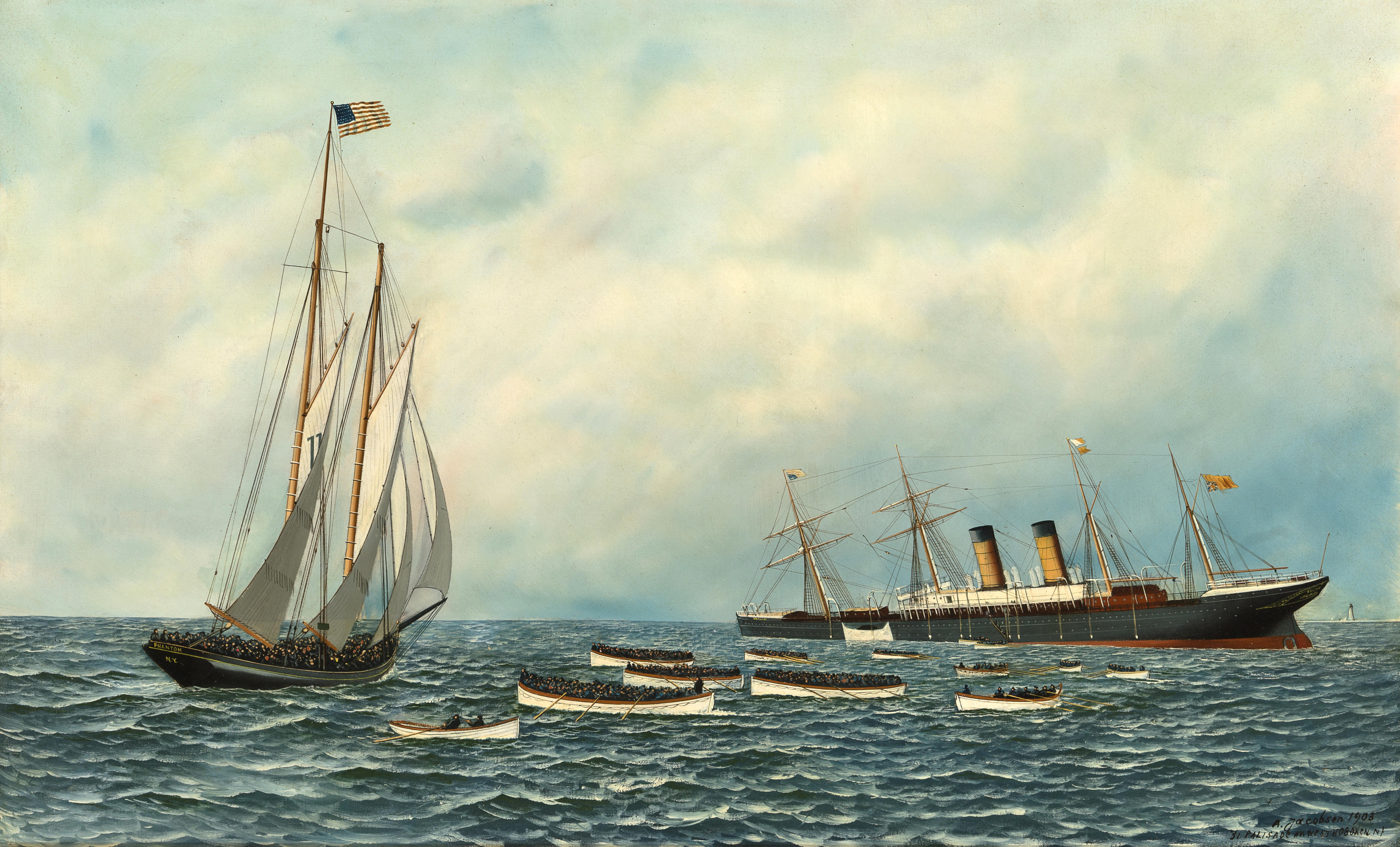
- Pilot-boat Phantom rescued the sinking S.S. Oregon. Painting by Antonio Jacobsen.

History

United States
- Name: Phantom
- Owner: R. Yates, John Handran
- Builder: Dennison J. Lawlor
- Cost: 4,000
- Launched: 1867
- Out of service: March 12, 1888
- Fate: Sank

General characteristics
- Class & type: schooner
- Tonnage: 51-tons TM
- Length: 75 ft 0 in (22.86 m)
- Beam: 21 ft 0 in (6.40 m)
- Depth: 8 ft 3 in (2.51 m)
- Propulsion: Sail
- Notes: Oak with iron and copper fastenings, and sheathed with yellow metal.

Phantom was a 19th-century Sandy Hook pilot boat built in 1867 from the designs by Dennison J. Lawlor. The schooner was considered a model for her type with a reputation for being very fast. She helped rescue the passengers on the steamship SS Oregon when it sank in 1886. She was one of the pilot-boats that was lost in the Great Blizzard of 1888. The Phantom was replaced by the pilot-boat William H. Bateman.

== Construction and service ==
The Phantom was built in Boston, Massachusetts in 1867. On May 7, 1867, she was purchased in Boston by the Portsmouth Association of Pilots located in New Hampshire. On arrival in New Hampshire, the pilots provided entertainment on board with prominent businessmen.

She was registered with the Record of American and Foreign Shipping, from 1881 to 1885, to R. Yates as the owner, and from 1886 to 1888, to John Handran as the owner. Her hailing port was New York and Captain Hundeahn was registered as her master from 1885 to 1888. Records indicate that she was 75 feet long and weighed 51-tons.

The sister pilot-boats, Pet and Phantom, were built on a model by the noted Boston builder and designer of pilot-boats, fishermen and yachts, Dennison J. Lawlor, at the Lawlor shipyard of East Boston, Massachusetts for the New York pilots. The schooners were considered models for their type with a reputation for being very fast. The Phantom was later sold to the Sandy Hook pilots and operated out of the port of New York for several years.

On April 28, 1874, the pilot-boat Phantom sent Captain Samuel C. Martin on board the barque Die Helmath from Germany.

== Rescue of SS Oregon ==
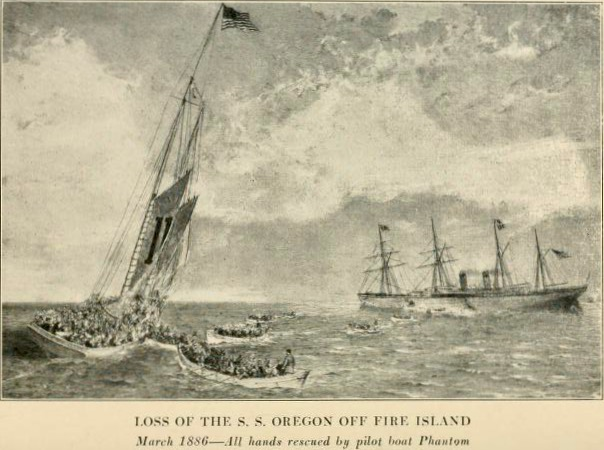
Pilot-Boat Phantom rescuing the SS Oregon in 1886.

On March 14, 1886, the SS Oregon of the Cunard Line was hit by a coal schooner off Fire Island with 845 people on board. Pilot Charles Samson of the New York pilot-boat Phantom No. 11 rescued 400 passengers and crew by placing some of them in the deck room on the small pilot-boat and transporting them safely to the North German Lloyd liner Fulda. The Phantom also towed into Sandy Hook eight life boats belonging to the Oregon. A lumber boat, Fannie H. Gorham, also helped in the rescue of the remaining passengers. The Oregon sank shortly after the passengers were taken off the ship. William Parker and E. E. Mitchell were also pilots on board the Phantom.

The State Department received from the British Government four gold and six silver medals awarded to the pilot and seamen of the Phantom for service rendered to the Oregon. Three of the recipients included E.E. Mitchell, Charles Samson, and William Parker.

On August 7, 1887, Sandy Hook pilot boat Centennial, No. 7, was on a cruise when it picked up a yawl that was from the pilot boat Phantom, No. 11, two years ago. It was washed overboard during a storm and had been drifting at the ocean bottom. The pilots were able to refurbish the yawl and place it back on the Phantom.

== End of service ==
During the Great Blizzard of March 1888, the Phantom, No. 11, was lost with all hands outside Sandy Hook, New Jersey. There were no reports of finding the boat, which had not been seen since March 12, 1888. Secretary Nash of the Board of Pilot Commissioners, said that the boat was sunk. The Phantom had two pilots, the boatkeeper, four seamen, and a cook. She was one of fifteen vessels lost or missing in the storm. Boatkeeper Pilot James Handran, the son of Pilot John Handran, was lost on the Phantom.

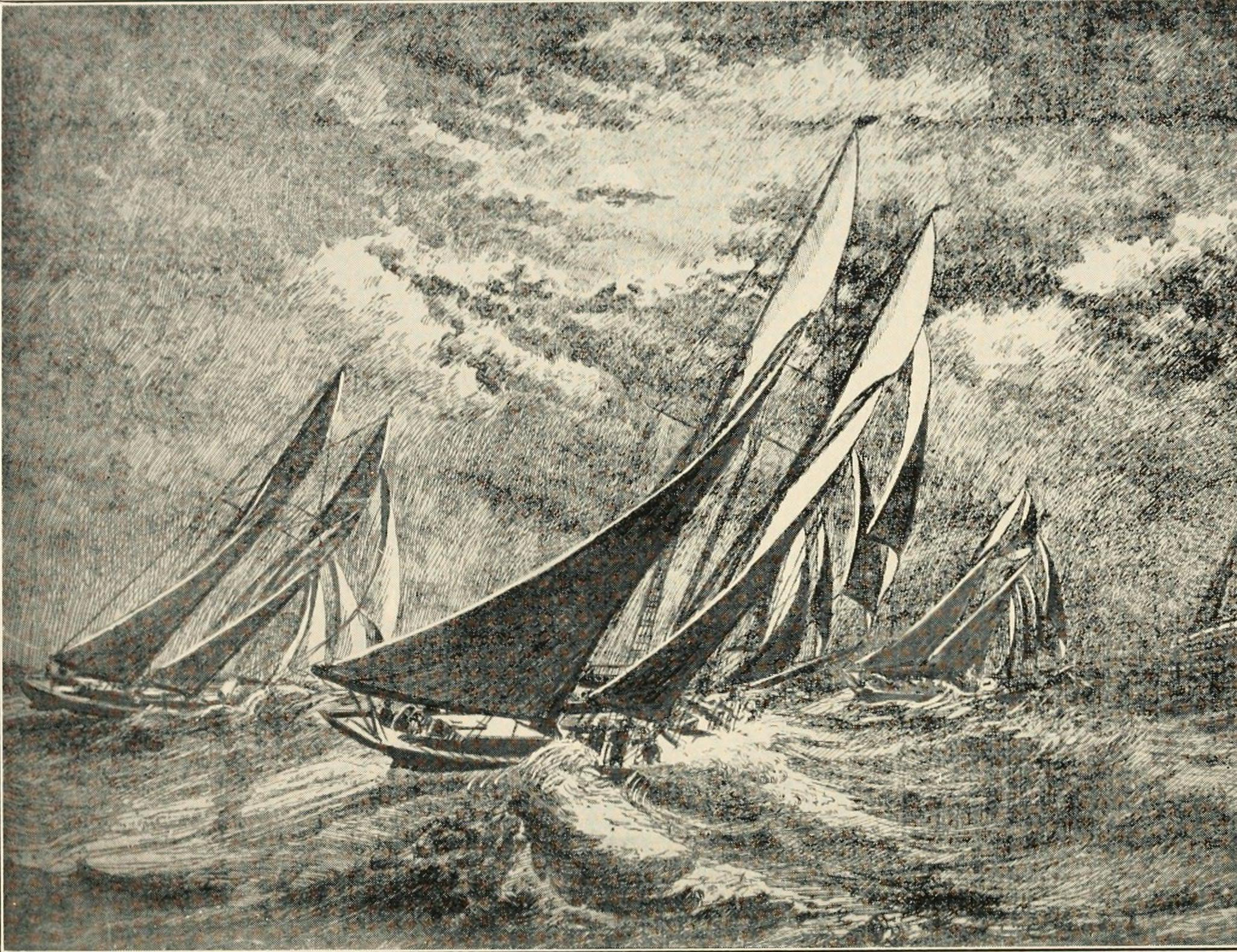
Pilot boats Williams, Bateman, and Blunt

The pilot-boat William H. Bateman, No. 11, took the place of the ill-fated pilot-boat Phantom. She was launched on July 18, 1888, at the C. & R. Poillon shipyard in south Brooklyn. Captain John Phelan was her commander, with pilots John Haurahan, Thomas Murphy, Ralph Turnure, James Brady and Thomas Sampson. Her sponsor was Commodore William H. Bateman.

== Earlier Phantom pilot-boats ==
There are several earlier dates of a Phantom pilot-boat, before the above 1867 date.

In 1840, there were only eight New York pilot boats. They were the Phantom, No. 1; Washington, No. 2; New York, No. 3; Jacob Bell, No. 4; Blossom, No. 5; T.H. Smith, No. 6; John E. Davidson, No. 7; and the Virginia, No. 8.

On 14 December 1840, James H. Smith and John Thompson, of the pilot boat Phantom, along with other pilots from the port of New York, stated that they had never been employed by J.D. Stevenson and no compensation has been offered or demanded.

The Hampton, Virginia Association purchased an older Boston schooner, Phantom.

Erastus B. Badger, a Boston businessman, mentions the pilot-boat Phantom in his 1843 memoirs about being an apprentice aboard the Phantom and learning the piloting business in the Boston Harbor. In 1846, Warren Simpson under Captain J. K. Lunt entered the pilot service as an apprentice on the Phantom. He served for four years before going off to the California gold rush.

In 1853, a three-masted schooner Phantom of 210-tons was built in New York by George Steers.

On January 15, 1856, it was reported that the pilot-boat Phantom, No. 11, was owned by James Berger, George Berger, and J. J. Bennet. She was built in Smithtown in Suffolk County, New York.

On January 21, 1856, the pilot-boat Phantom, went ashore near the south end of the Woodlands, New Jersey. She was badly damaged. She had been in service for fourteen years.

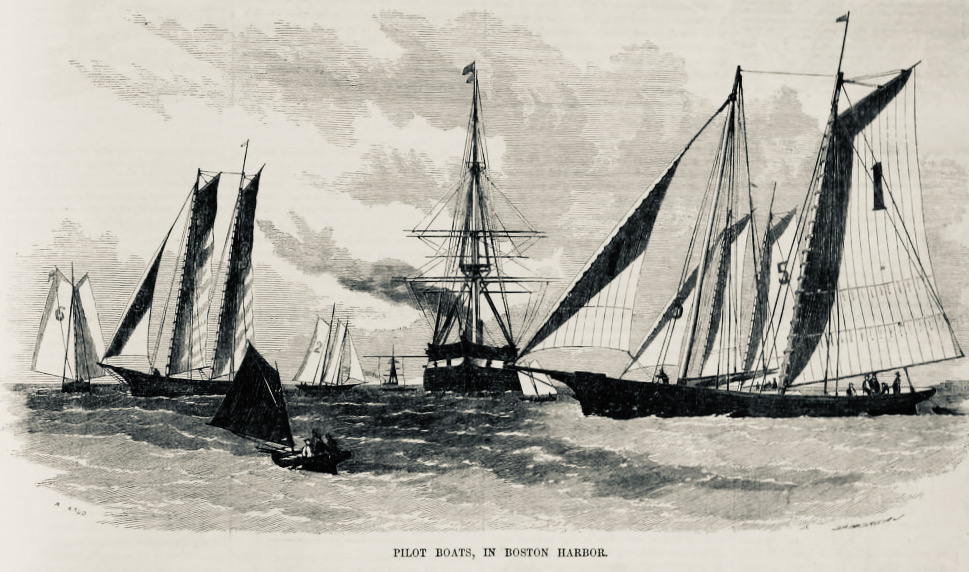
Pilot Boats In Boston Harbor by Alfred Waud.

On January 18, 1857, the Phantom, during a snowstorm, was dragged ashore on the south side of Georges Island, Massachusetts, but was able to safely return to the Boston Harbor. On February 7, 1857, James Bradley was the boatkeeper of the pilot-boat Phantom in East Boston. It was moored in Deer Island in Massachusetts.

Artist Alfred Waud did a marine pencil drawing of the Boston Pilot Boat Fleet in 1859, which appeared in the Ballou's Pictorial of 1859. The drawing lists the Phantom, No. 5; Syren, No. 1; William Starkey, No 6; the Coquette and the Friend. The story in the Ballou's Pictorial said "These boats are all well-built, of exquisite model and crack sailors, and manned by as fine a set of men as ever trod a deck or handled a sheet. They ride the waves like sea-ducks, and with their hardy crews are constantly exposed to the roughest weather."

== See also ==
- List of Northeastern U. S. Pilot Boats
