= William Starkey (pilot boat) =

Boston Pilot boat

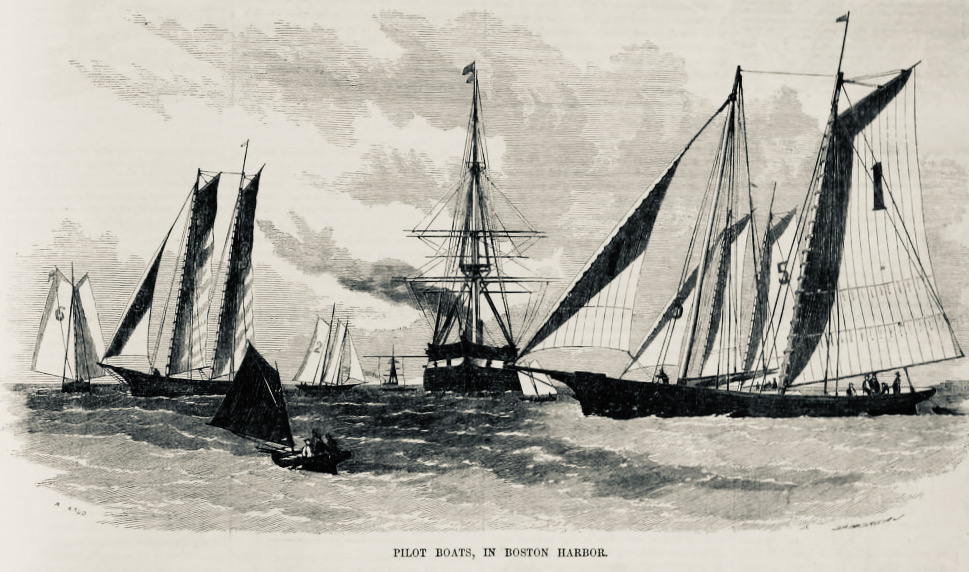
- William Starkey, No. 6, and other pilot boats in the Boston Harbor.

History

United States
- Name: William Starkey
- Namesake: Captain William Starkey
- Owner: W. W. Goddard (1854); Samuel Wood (1865); Oliver E. Edwards (1865); William Parrish (1865); Hezekiah Williams (1865); Thomas Darling (1899)
- Operator: Abel F. Hayden (1858); P. H. Chandler (1858); S. S. Hunt (1858); Asa H. Joselyn (1858); A. Nash (1858); William Read (1858)
- Builder: Thatcher Magoun shipyard
- Launched: 1848
- Out of service: November 13, 1899
- Fate: Sold

General characteristics
- Class & type: schooner
- Tonnage: 54.55 TM
- Length: 72 ft 0 in (21.95 m)
- Beam: 19 ft 0 in (5.79 m)
- Depth: 6 ft 0 in (1.83 m)
- Propulsion: Sail

The William Starkey was a 19th-century pilot boat built in 1854, by Benjamin F. Delano at the Thatcher Magoun shipyard for W. W. Goddard, of Boston. Starkey helped transport Boston maritime pilots between inbound or outbound ships coming into the Boston Harbor. She was named for Captain William Starkey, one of the founders of the Boston Marine Society. The Virginia Pilots' Association purchased the Boston schooner William Starkey in 1865, where she became a pioneer of the associations' fleet and the oldest pilot boat on the Atlantic and Gulf coasts. In the age steam, she was sold in 1899 to Thomas Darling of Hampton, Virginia.

== Construction and service ==
William Starkey was a Boston schooner-rigged pilot boat built in 1854, by Benjamin F. Delano at the Thatcher Magoun shipyard, in Medford, Massachusetts, for W. W. Goddard of Boston. She was No. 6, in the Boston fleet. She was named for Captain William Starkey, one of the founders of the Boston Marine Society.

On April 19, 1858, Captains P. H. Chandler, Abel F. Hayden, S. S. Hunt, Asa H. Joselyn, A. Nash, and William Read were assigned to the Starkey. Hayden received his Boston pilot commission to pilot vessels in the waters of the Boston Harbor and Massachusetts Bay on December 6, 1858. At the same time he joined the pilot boat William Starkey, No. 2.

Artist Alfred Waud did a marine pencil drawing of the Boston Pilot Boat Fleet in 1859, which appeared in the Ballou's Pictorial of 1859. The story in the Ballou's Pictorial said:

These boats are all well-built, of exquisite model and crack sailors, and manned by as fine a set of men as ever trod a deck or handled a sheet. They ride the waves like sea-ducks, and with their hardy crews are constantly exposed to the roughest weather.

—Ballou's Pictorial, 1859, Vol. XVI, No. 14.

The drawing lists the schooner-rigged boats with their number on the mainsail. They included the Phantom, No. 5; Syren, No. 1; William Starkey No 6; the Coquette and the Friend.

On November 3, 1861, pilot boat William Starkey, No. 2, sent a dory ashore at Shag Rocks to rescue the survivors of the square rigged Maritana from Liverpool, which ran into a snowstorm coming into the Massachusetts Bay and crashed onto Shag Rocks. The pilot boat was manned by Captain Samuel James of Hull, who was a member of the lifesaving family.

=== Virginia Pilots' Association ===
In the summer of 1865, the Virginia Pilots' Association purchased from Captain Hunt, the Boston pilot schooner William Starkey for $3,500. Her new owners were Captain Samuel Wood, Oliver E. Edwards, William Parrish and Hezekiah Williams. She went on her first cruise in the Virginia waters on July 26, 1865. For two years she was the only vessel owned by the association until they bought the boat bought Phantom in 1867, from Boston. The Starkey was used as a station boat by the Pilots' Association. During this time the apprentice pilots were trained by making soundings from the pilot boats instead of relying on buoys.

== End of service ==
On November 13, 1899, the William Starkey, was sold to Thomas Darling, of Hampton, Virginia. The Starkey, was a pioneer of the Virginia pilots' Association fleet and the oldest pilot boat on the Atlantic and Gulf coasts. She was sold when the Association bought the steam pilot boat Relief. The Starkey was 54.55-tons; 72-ft in length; 19-ft beam and 6-ft depth of hold.

A ship model of the pilot schooner William Starkey, No. 2, of Norfolk, Virginia was made in 1952.

== See also ==
- List of Northeastern U. S. Pilot Boats
