= Joseph Henderson (pilot) =

American harbor pilot (1826–1890)

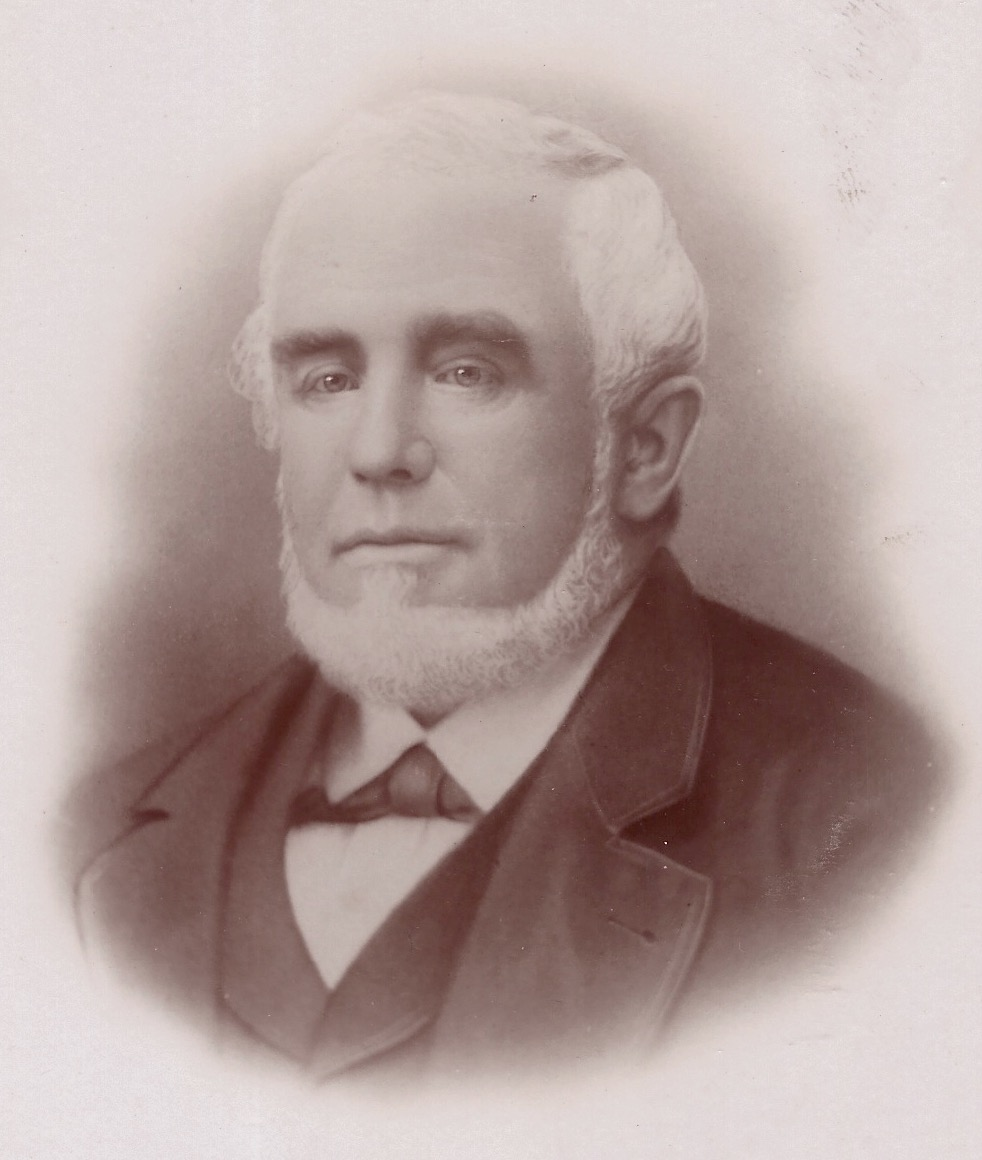
- Henderson ca. 1880
- Born: September 9, 1826; Charleston, South Carolina, US
- Died: October 7, 1890 (aged 64); Brooklyn, New York, US
- Occupation: harbor pilot
- Spouse: Angelina Annetta Weaver
- Children: 6, including Alexander D. Henderson

Joseph Henderson (September 9, 1826 – October 7, 1890) was a 19th-century American harbor pilot who guided large vessels into and out of New York Harbor as a Sandy Hook pilot. During his long career his work included bringing the ship that carried the Statue of Liberty safely into port after its trip from Europe.

== Early life ==
Henderson was born in Charleston, South Carolina. At sixteen years of age, Henderson left Charleston to find passage to New York as a cabin boy on a ship traveling there. By 1845, he was a New York pilot. Henderson married Angelina Annetta Weaver on February 11, 1849.

== Career ==
Henderson was a Sandy Hook pilot in New York Harbor and along the Atlantic Coast during the American Civil War. In 1846, he took out his pilot papers with the Board of Commissioners of Pilots of the State of New York. He became adept in all branches of piloting.

Henderson owned several pilot ships in the Sandy Hook service. By the age of twenty-one, he was captain of his own schooner, self-educated in seamanship, and a New York Sandy Hook pilot. He spent over 45 years as a New York pilot and was in more boat accidents than any other pilots. On September 13, 1853, he became a Branch Pilot on the pilot boat Ellwood Walter, No. 7, belonging to the New York Pilots' Association.

In December 1856, Henderson was one of the captains for the pilot boat No. 11, George W. Blunt. On January 21, 1857, Henderson was on the Blunt, anchored at Coney Island, but hemmed in by the ice.

== Civil War ==
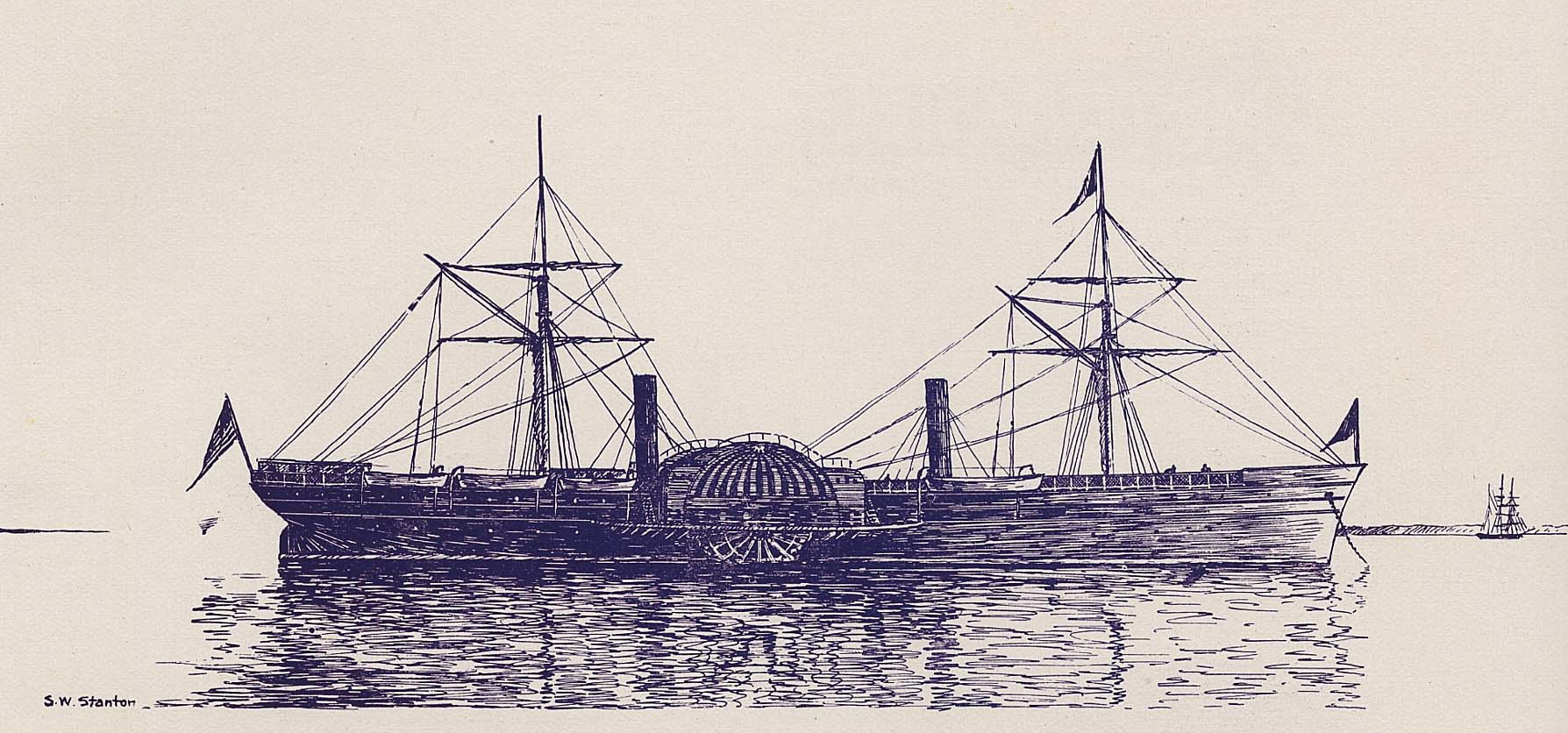
Arago (1855)

During the Civil War, Henderson was a pilot on the steamboat transports Arago and Fulton, running from Newport News, Virginia, to Port Royal, South Carolina.

Henderson was one-quarter owner of the William Bell, a pilot boat built in Greenpoint, Brooklyn, New York, in 1864 and co-owned with other Sandy Hook pilots. On August 11, 1864, the William Bell ventured too far out to sea and was captured and burned by the Confederate raiding steamer the CSS Tallahassee. Henderson was at sea on another vessel at the time of the capture, acting as pilot for the Government.

== Post-Civil War ==
In December 1869, Henderson offered his services to pilot the steam vessel Tybee out of the port of New York, leaving for San Domingo, Dominican Republic; but the shipmaster refused to employ him. The Tybee proceeded to sea without a pilot of the port on board. In a trial, "Henderson v. Spofford," a judgment was made in the district court of New York City in favor of Henderson for thirty-eight dollars and eighteen cents plus the costs for pilotage fees out of the Port of New York.

In 1879, during the construction of the east river bridge, Henderson was called upon as an expert seaman to determine the height of the water span of the Brooklyn Bridge, a new bridge from Brooklyn to New York City. Another witness, Edward W. Serrell, who was a civil engineer, said that he had examined the plan and sections of the bridge and that the calculations of the assumed strength of the bridge were not accurate; and the effect of gales or wind would have upon the structure and upon foot passengers. There was a fear of cars being overthrown and woman being raised by the wind and cast over the railing.

In 1883, Henderson, Walter Brewer, Henry Seguine, William J. Barry, and Josiah Johnson started the Sandy Hook Pilot Boat Company to have ownership and control of vessels and equipment for the use of pilots in the New York Harbor and water ways of Sandy Hook. They received a certificate of incorporation from Albany, New York. The capital stock raised was $100,000, which was to be invested in pilot boats and other equipment. Their office was in Burling-slip in New York City. There was opposition to the project as it was seen as forming a union. The new Sandy Hook Pilot Boat company intended to influence legislation of a bill to reduce the pilot fees.

Henderson's appearance with the Isère was reported in several New York newspapers. On June 16, 1885, at ten o'clock at night, the Pilot Boat Pet, No. 9 was sighted by the French steamer Isère, laden with the Statue of Liberty. She was about ten miles outside the Sandy Hook lightship. Henderson set sail and when near enough launched a dingy and pulled alongside the Isère. He was taken on board and they then headed for the Sandy Hook Lightship. Henderson judged that the night was too dark with rain falling for safe crossing of the bar. He took charge of the ship, brought the ship to an anchor, and stood offshore waiting for daylight. On June 17, the Isère arrived at the Horseshoe of Sandy Hook and it was moved to Gravesend Bay alongside the man-of-war USS Omaha. On Friday, at 1 o'clock, the Isère reached Bedloe's Island. The ferryboat Atlantic left the ferry house at the foot of Wall Street and then passed Governors Island. Then the Atlantic came next to the Isère. The first man from the Atlantic was Henderson.

In 1888, Henderson was on board the pilot boat America, No. 21 during the Great Blizzard of 1888, when the vessel rode out the storm off the Shinnecock Light.

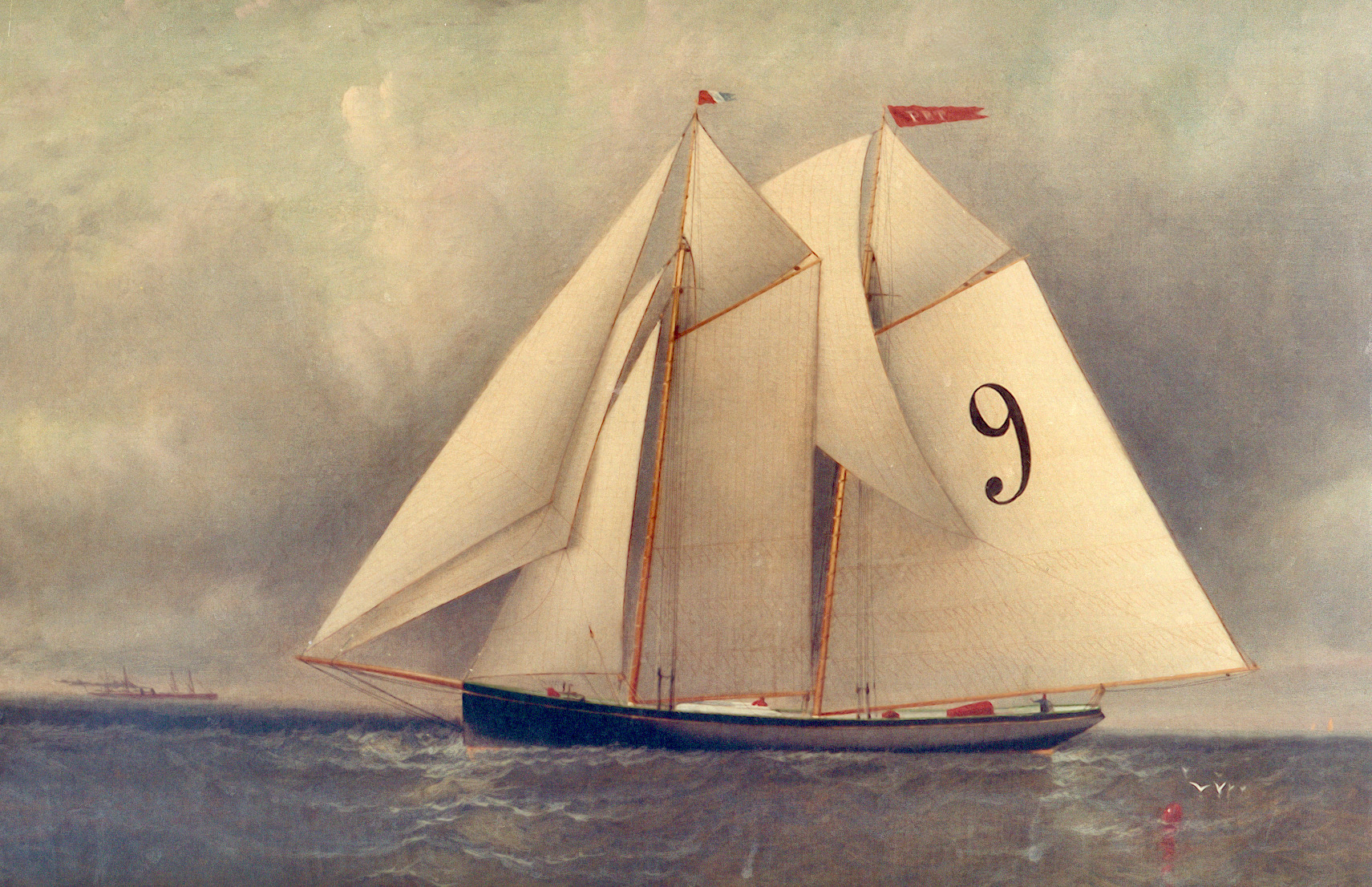
New York Sandy Hook Pilot Boat "Pet, No. 9"

On October 28, 1872, Henderson, captain of the New York pilot boat "Pet, No. 9", sighted the brig Emily during a heavy gale. The crew of the Emily came on board the Pet, which lay by the brig until 7 p.m., at which time the Emily capsized. It was not until the next day that the crew members were transferred from the Pet to the steamship Italy, from Liverpool, and brought to the New York port. On September 22, 1880, Pet, No. 9, ran across the schooner Gladiator, which sailed from Barbados for Yarmouth, Nova Scotia, that was overturned bottom up. The crew lowered a boat, which went alongside the vessel. They cut a hole in her side to sink her but discovered a terrible stench that was coming from below. A man was discovered with a rope around his neck hanging from the bowsprit. The crew of the vessel were laying dead in her cabin. On November 20, 1889, Henderson was commander of Pet, No. 9, which was lost in the Newport, Rhode Island, harbor. It was reported as having gone to pieces and left abandoned and was partly insured.

Ships

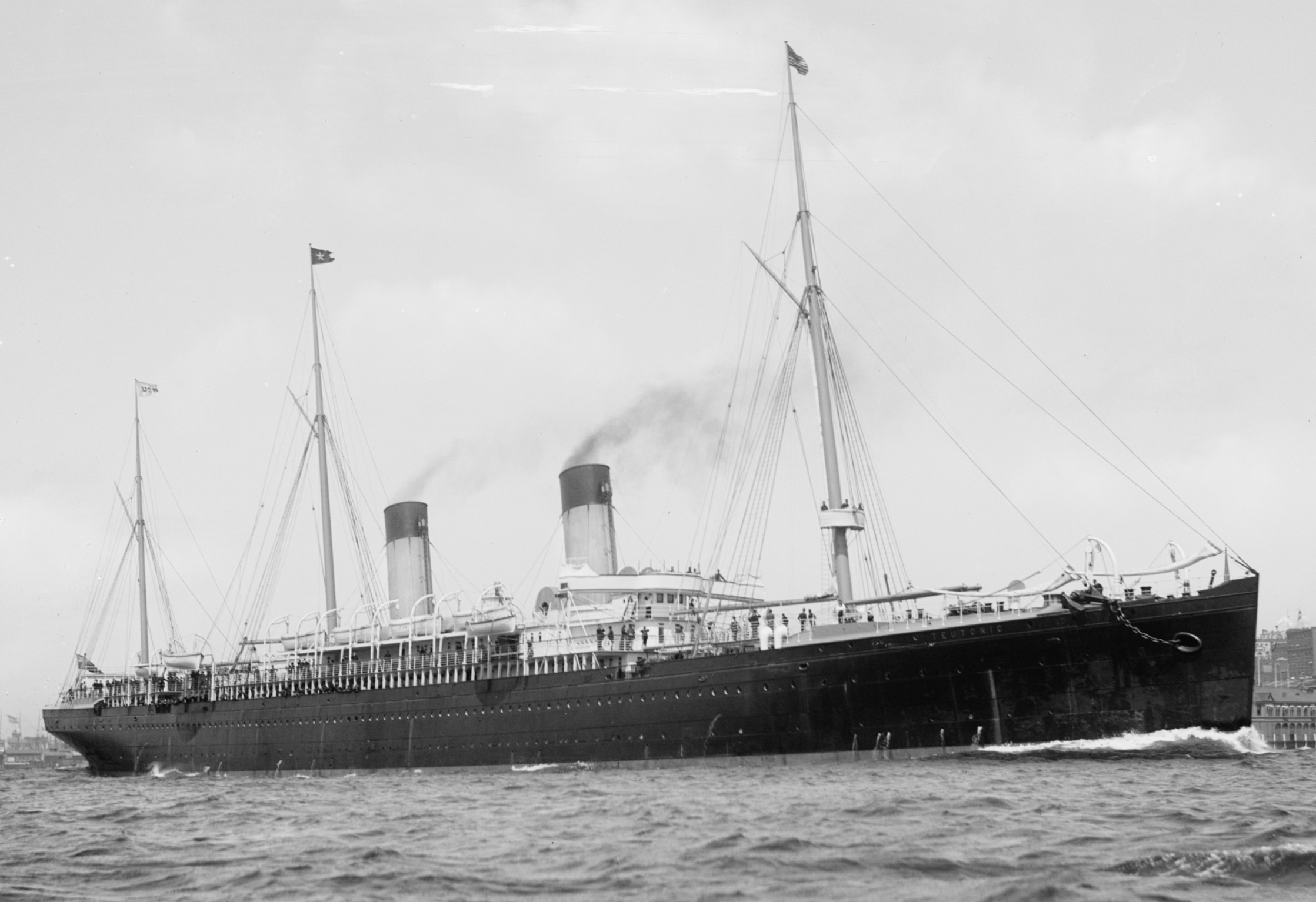
RMS Teutonic

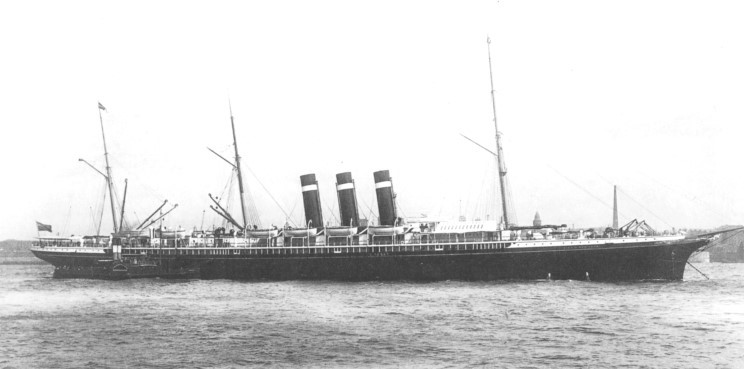
SS City of New York

On August 13, 1890, Henderson took the White Star Line passenger steamer RMS Teutonic to sea on its first westward race across the Atlantic with the steamship SS City of New York. The race ended in victory for the Teutonic. The race from Queenstown harbor, Ireland to Sandy Hook, took five days and nineteen hours. On August 21, 1890, Teutonic, piloted by Henderson, and City of New York raced from the New York pier to the Sandy Hook bar out to the bay. Hundreds of people were present to observe the liners as they departed.

On August 23, 1890, Henderson guided the cruiser USS Baltimore out to sea when it carried inventor John Ericsson's remains to their final resting place in Stockholm, Sweden.

== Death ==
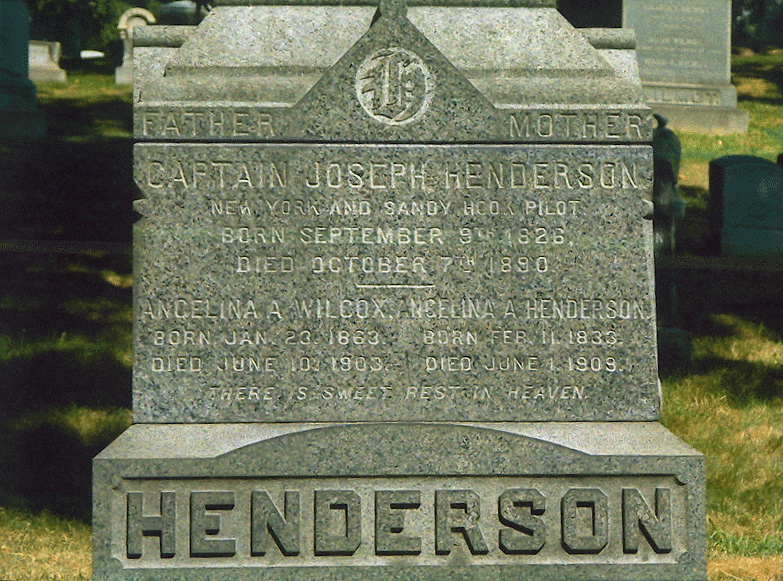
Joseph Henderson tombstone at Greenwood Cemetery, Brooklyn, New York. Lot#13244 and Section #88

On October 4, 1890, Henderson left home in good health and sailed to Sandy Hook on board his pilot boat America, No. 21. During this trip, he became ill and was brought home to New York and died of peritonitis on October 7, 1890, at his home in Brooklyn. He was one of the oldest pilots in service. He was buried in the Green-Wood Cemetery.

== See also ==
- List of Northeastern U. S. Pilot Boats
