= Pet, No. 9 =

19th century Sandy Hook pilot boat

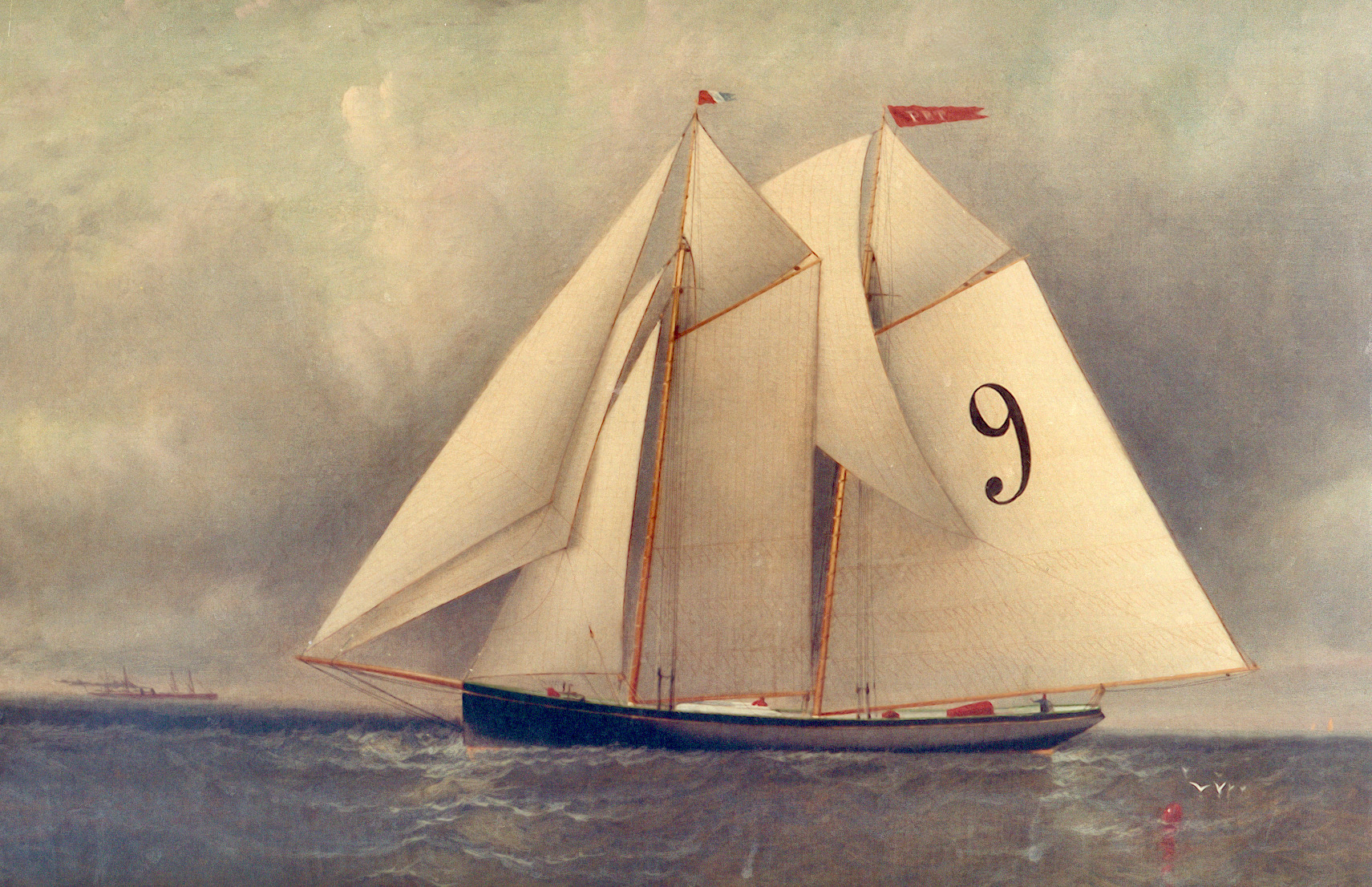
- Pet, No. 9, by Elisha Taylor Baker (circa 1880)

History

United States
- Name: Pet
- Owner: New York Pilots
- Operator: Joseph Henderson
- Builder: Edward A. Costigan at Charlestown, Massachusetts
- Cost: $14,000
- In service: circa 1876 - 1885
- Fate: sank at sea

General characteristics
- Displacement: 54 tons
- Length: 54 feet
- Beam: 21 feet
- Draft: 10 feet, 6 inches
- Propulsion: sails
- Sail plan: Schooner-rigged
- Notes: Signal letters, 399-20-175

Pet No. 9 was a pilot boat used by the New York Sandy Hook Pilots in the 19th century. The schooner was used to pilot vessels to and from the Port of New York and New Jersey.

== Construction and service ==
The pilot boat Pet was built in 1866 by Edward A. Costigan at Charlestown, Massachusetts, for Boston pilot Captain Abel T. Hayden, the father of Abel F. Hayden. She was 54 tons, steered by a tiller. The sister pilot-boats, Pet and Phantom, were built on a model by Dennison J. Lawlor of East Boston, Massachusetts for the New York pilots. The vessels had a reputation for swiftness under sail.

The Pet was in service for a number of years in Boston. The Boston pilot-boat Pet was purchased by Captain Joseph Henderson on August 29, 1872.

The pilot-boat Pet, was registered with the Record of American and Foreign Shipping in 1876. She was listed as a pilot schooner built in 1868. The New York Pilots were listed as owners and Joseph Henderson was listed as Master.

On November 21, 1889, the Pet, No. 9, stuck on the rocks in Newport, Rhode Island, harbor and sank and reported as having been abandoned.

== Specifications ==
The Pet was 56 tons, 78 feet long, 21½ feet beam, 8½ feet depth of hold, draws 11 feet aft, and 6 ½ feet forward, and spreads about 1,800 yards of canvas to the three lower sails.

== See also ==
List of Northeastern U. S. Pilot Boats
