= D. J. Lawlor =

Sandy Hook pilot boat (1881–1895)

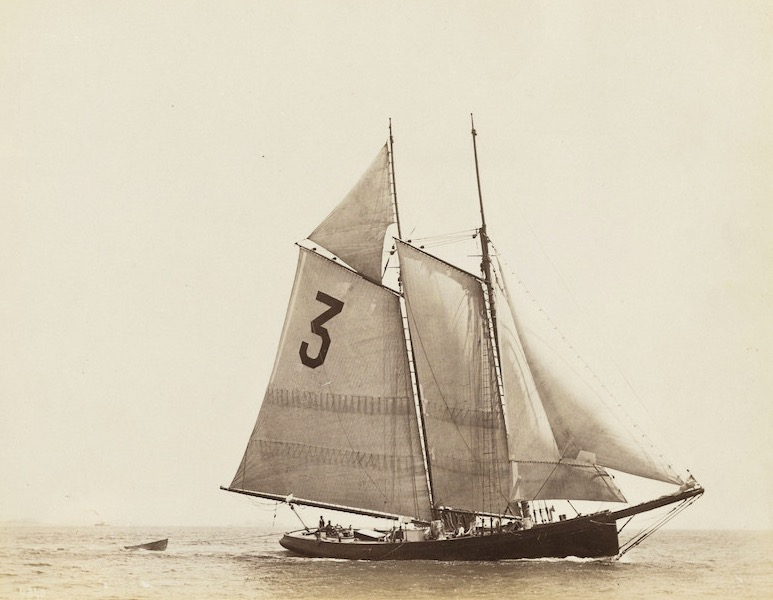
- Pilot-boat D.J. Lawlor. Painting by Nathaniel Livermore Stebbins.

History

United States
- Name: D. J. Lawlor
- Owner: Captains William V. Abbott, Abel F. Hayden, and James H. Reid
- Builder: Dennison J. Lawlor
- Cost: $13,000
- Launched: December 22, 1881
- Out of service: January 4, 1895
- Fate: Sank

General characteristics
- Class & type: schooner
- Tonnage: 75-tons TM
- Length: 86 ft 0 in (26.21 m)
- Beam: 22 ft 0 in (6.71 m)
- Depth: 9 ft 8 in (2.95 m)
- Propulsion: Sail
- Notes: Bagnall & Loud blocked

The D.J. Lawlor was a 19th-century Boston pilot boat built in 1881 at North Weymouth, Massachusetts. The schooner was considered the largest (86 feet) for her type, noted for her seaworthiness and heavy weather performance. She was named after the prominent Boston shipbuilder Dennison J. Lawlor. She was struck by a fishing schooner Horace B. Parker, in 1895, and was replaced by the pilot-boat Liberty in 1896.

== Construction and service ==
The D.J. Lawlor, was built at North Weymouth, Massachusetts by Nathaniel Porter Keen. The D.J. Lawlor (No 3), was launched at Quincy Point in Quincy, Massachusetts on December 22, 1881, for Captain Abel F. Hayden. She was the largest of her build and rig in the United States and noted for her seaworthiness and heavy weather performance. She was designed by Dennison J. Lawlor, for whom she was named. She took the place of the pilot-boat Gracie, that was sold to the Wilmington, Delaware pilots.

On February 16, 1882, the D.J. Lawlor, took a trial trip at Battery Wharf in Boston, Massachusetts. The excursion went to Minot's Ledge Light, one mile offshore of the towns of Cohasset and Scituate, Massachusetts.

The D.J. Lawlor, was registered as a pilot Schooner with the Record of American and Foreign Shipping, from 1883 to 1895. Her ship master was Abel F. Hayden; her owners were Abel F. Hayden, James H. Reid, and William V. Abbott; built in 1882 at North Weymouth, Massachusetts; and her hailing port was the Port of Boston. Her dimensions were 86 ft. in length; 22 ft. breadth of beam; 8.8 ft. depth of hold; and 75-tons Tonnage.

== End of service ==
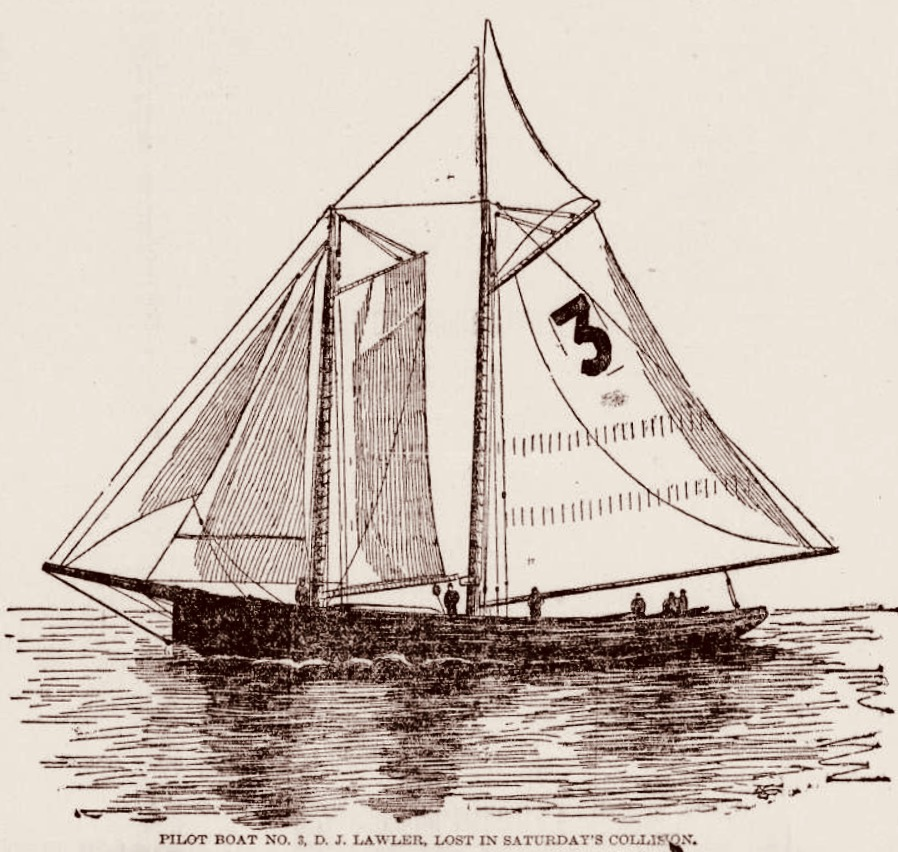
Pilot Boat No. 3, D.J. Lawlor, lost in 1895 collision.

On January 4, 1895, during a heavy mist, the Boston pilot-boat D.J. Lawlor, No. 3, was struck and sank off Minot's Ledge Light by the Gloucester fishing schooner Horace B. Parker. Four of the crew perished. Rudolph Harrison, the steward, was the only one that survived. She cost $13,000 and was fully insured through the agency of Franklin S. Phelps & Company. Captain William V. Abbott, who was one-quarter owner, was not on board the boat when it sank.

The owners of the D.J. Lawlor, filed charges in the U.S. District Court against the fishing schooner Horace B. Parker, for damages for the loss of the pilot-boat, which was valued at $12,000. They claimed the collision was caused by the carelessness of the schooner with no lookout on board.

In 1896, the 'Liberty was built by John Bishop at his shipyard in Gloucester, Massachusetts, to take the place of the ill-fated pilot-boat D.J. Lawlor. The boat was built for pilots Murdock Low, Nelson and John Ward. She was 104 feet long, 118-tons and cost $17,000. She was launched on March 30, 1896.

== See also ==
- List of Northeastern U. S. Pilot Boats
