= Edward A. Costigan =

Early American shipbuilder

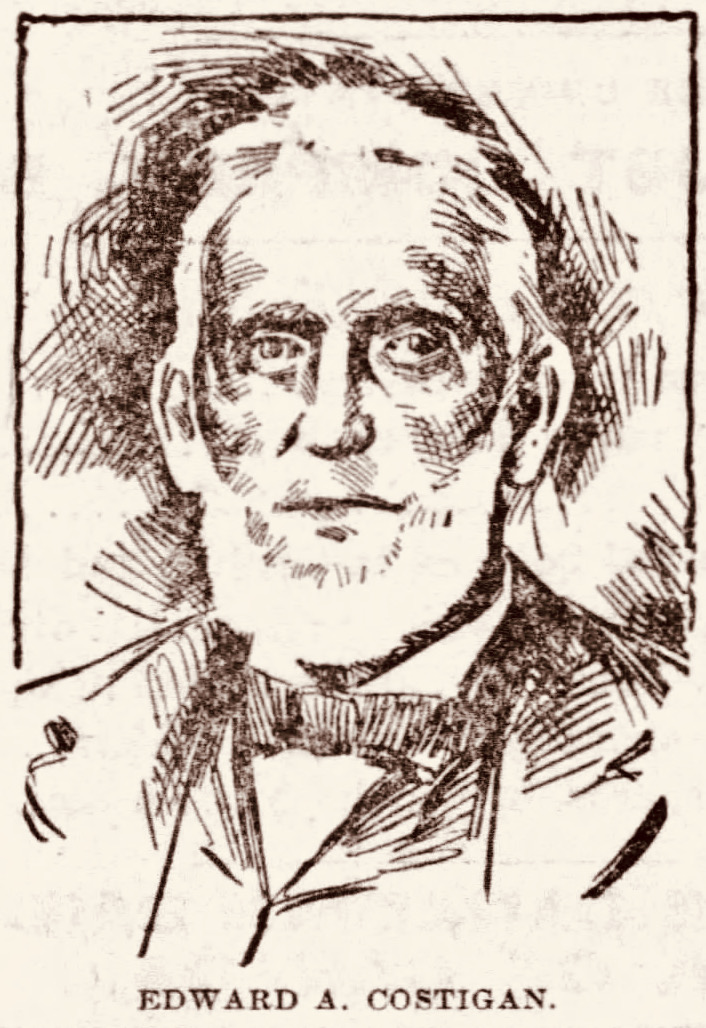
- Edward A. Costigan, Boston Shipbuilder
- Born: October , 1820; Charlestown, Boston, Massachusetts, US
- Died: June 7, 1901 (aged 80); Boston, Massachusetts, US
- Occupation: Shipbuilder
- Spouse: Mary F. Griffece
- Children: 3

Edward A. Costigan (October 1820 – June 7, 1901), was a 19th-century Boston, Massachusetts shipbuilder. In 1858, he founded the E. A. Costigan shipyard at Commercial Street in Boston, where he built many notable pilot boats and scows. He was one of the oldest of Boston shipbuilders, being connected with shipbuilding most of his life. Costigan died in Boston in 1901.

== Early life ==
Edward A. Costigan was born in October 1820, in Boston, Massachusetts, United States. At the age of 15, he joined the Fire Department and became Chief Engineer in Charlestown. He remained in the fire department for 33 years.

Costigan had seen many celebrities and events including: major general Lafayette riding through Charlestown square in a barouche open carriage. He saw President Andrew Jackson; Com Elliott, President John Tyler in 1842; Edward VII in 1860 when he visited Boston, Massachusetts; the Duke of York in 1865; General Lewis Cass; President Ulysses S. Grant at the statue of The Minute Man at Concord, Massachusetts and President Andrew Johnson when he visited Boston in the late 1860s. On August 11, 1834, he saw the burning of the Ursuline Convent in Charlestown. At age 16, he saw the pirates, who boarded the brig Mexican, hung at the Leverett Street Jail in Boston.

== Career ==
Edward A. Costigan was one of the Boston's oldest shipbuilders being connected with shipbuilding most of his life. He did fishing work from the ages of 11 to 15 on fishing vessels catching Mackerel. He was on the 100-ton schooner Louise, which sailed from Boston to North Carolina bringing back grain. In 1841, he did his apprentice work as a shipbuilder at the Brown & Lovel shipyard in Chelsea, Massachusetts. He later worked at the Holbrook & Dickinson shipyard. In 1842, he stood on the deck of the ship Thomas H. Perkins in Medford, Massachusetts. At Holbrook & Dickinson he helped build the pilot boat Northern Light, which sailed from Boston to California on December 17, 1849.

In 1858, he launched his own shipyard at 361 Commercial Street, Boston, Massachusetts, which he had for thirty years. He had a large business and employed up to 40 workmen. He built pilot boats, scows, which is a flat-bottomed barge, and did repairing and caulking. Two pilot boats he built were the Pet and the Gracie.

In 1876, Costigan retired from the shipbuilding business. He was a resident of Dorchester, Boston, which is a neighborhood in the city of Boston. He belonged to the Massachusetts Charitable Mechanic Association, which he joined in 1884.

== Death ==
Edward A. Costigan died, at age 81, on June 7, 1901, at the Old Men's home in Boston, Massachusetts.

== See also ==
- List of Northeastern U. S. Pilot Boats
