= Alfred Waud =

American artist and illustrator (1828-1891)

Alfred Rudolph Waud
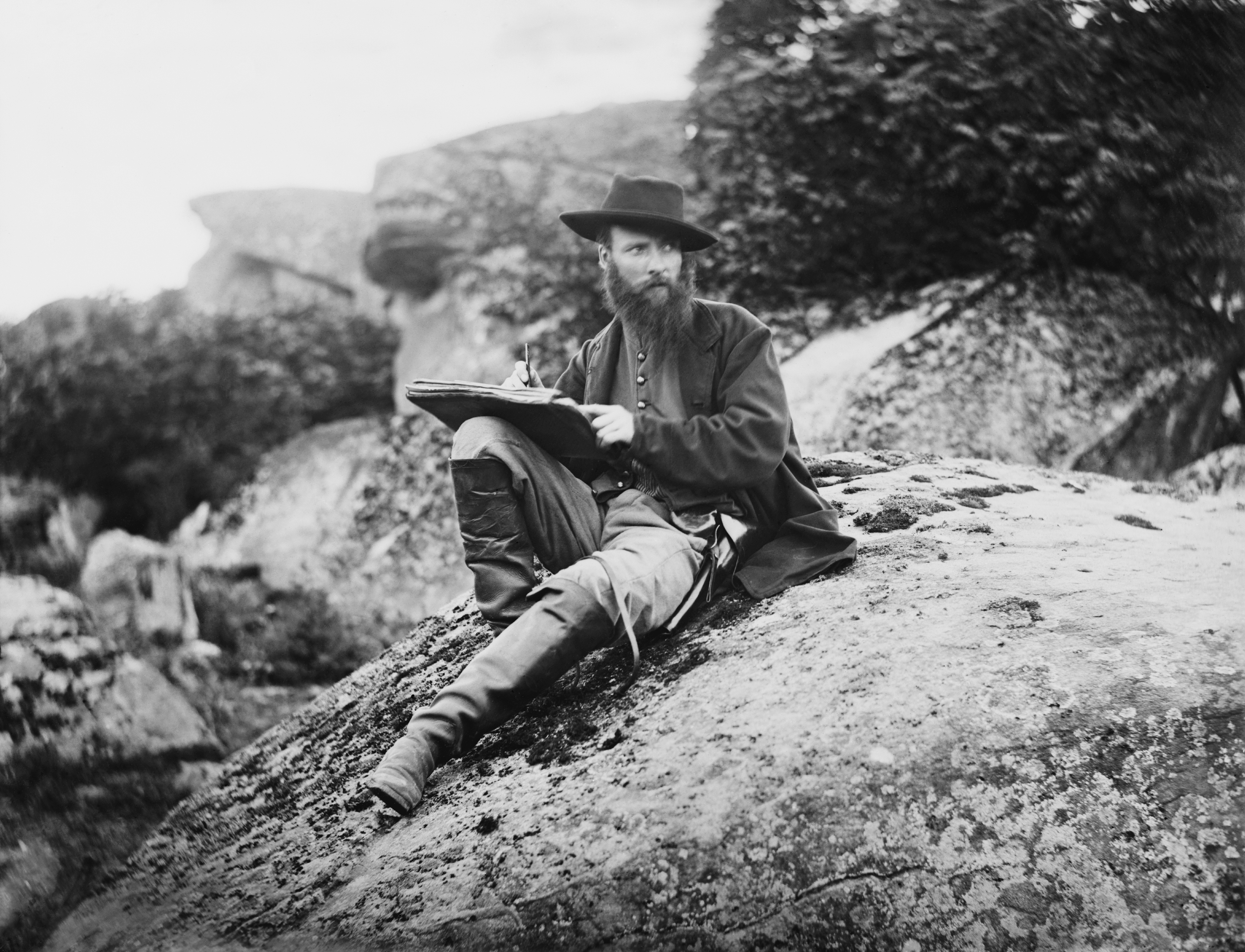
- Waud photographed in 1863 by Timothy H. O'Sullivan sitting in Devil's Den after the Battle of Gettysburg
- Born: Alfred Robert Waud; October 2, 1828; London, England
- Died: April 6, 1891 (aged 62); Marietta, Georgia, US
- Occupations: Artist; illustrator

Alfred Rudolph Waud (Pronounced: /wɔːd/; October 2, 1828 – April 6, 1891) was an American artist and illustrator, born and raised in Hackney, London, England. He is most notable for the sketches he made as an artist correspondent during the American Civil War.

== Early life and education ==
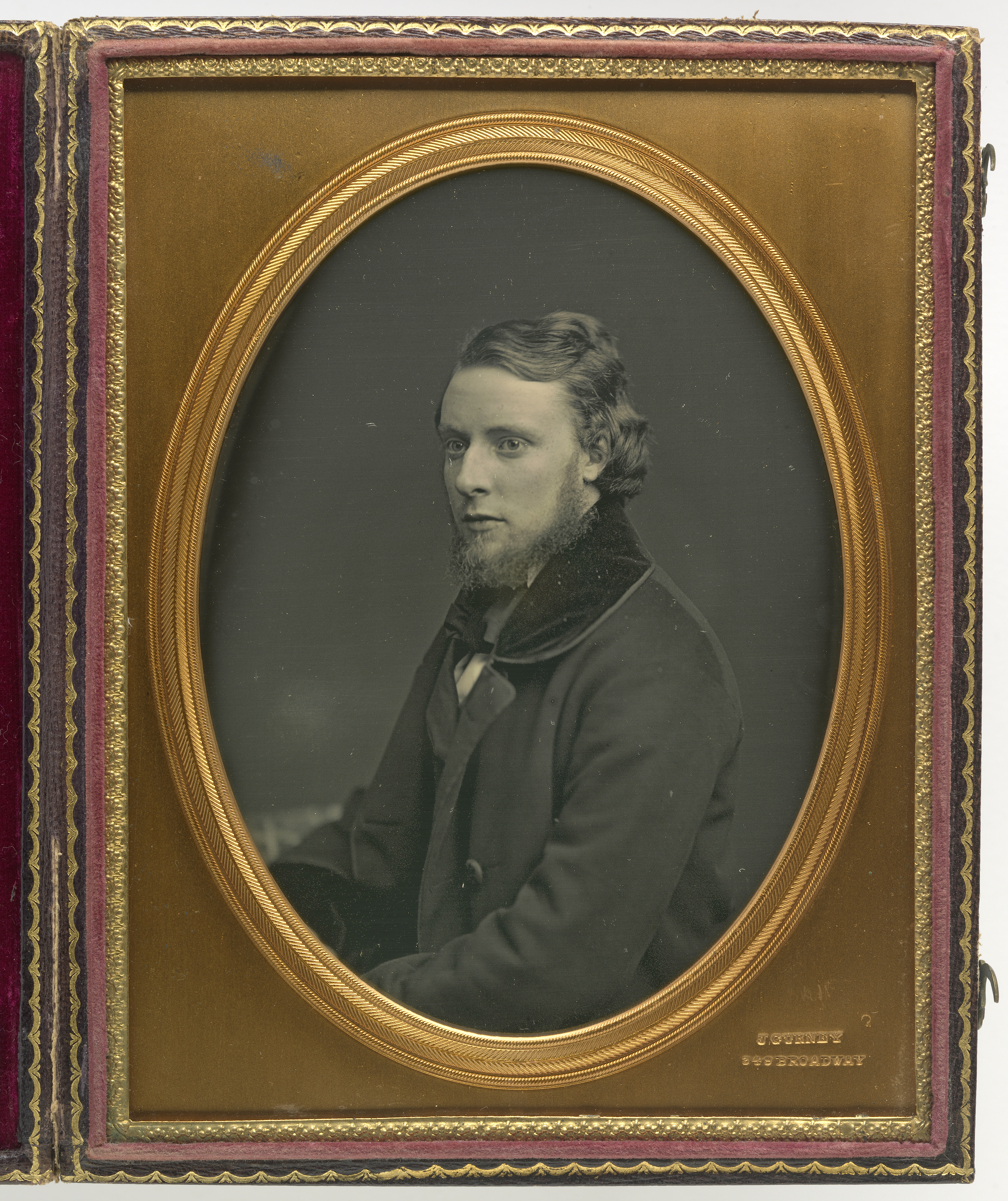
A photo of Waud by Jeremiah Gurney, c. 1853 now in the National Portrait Gallery

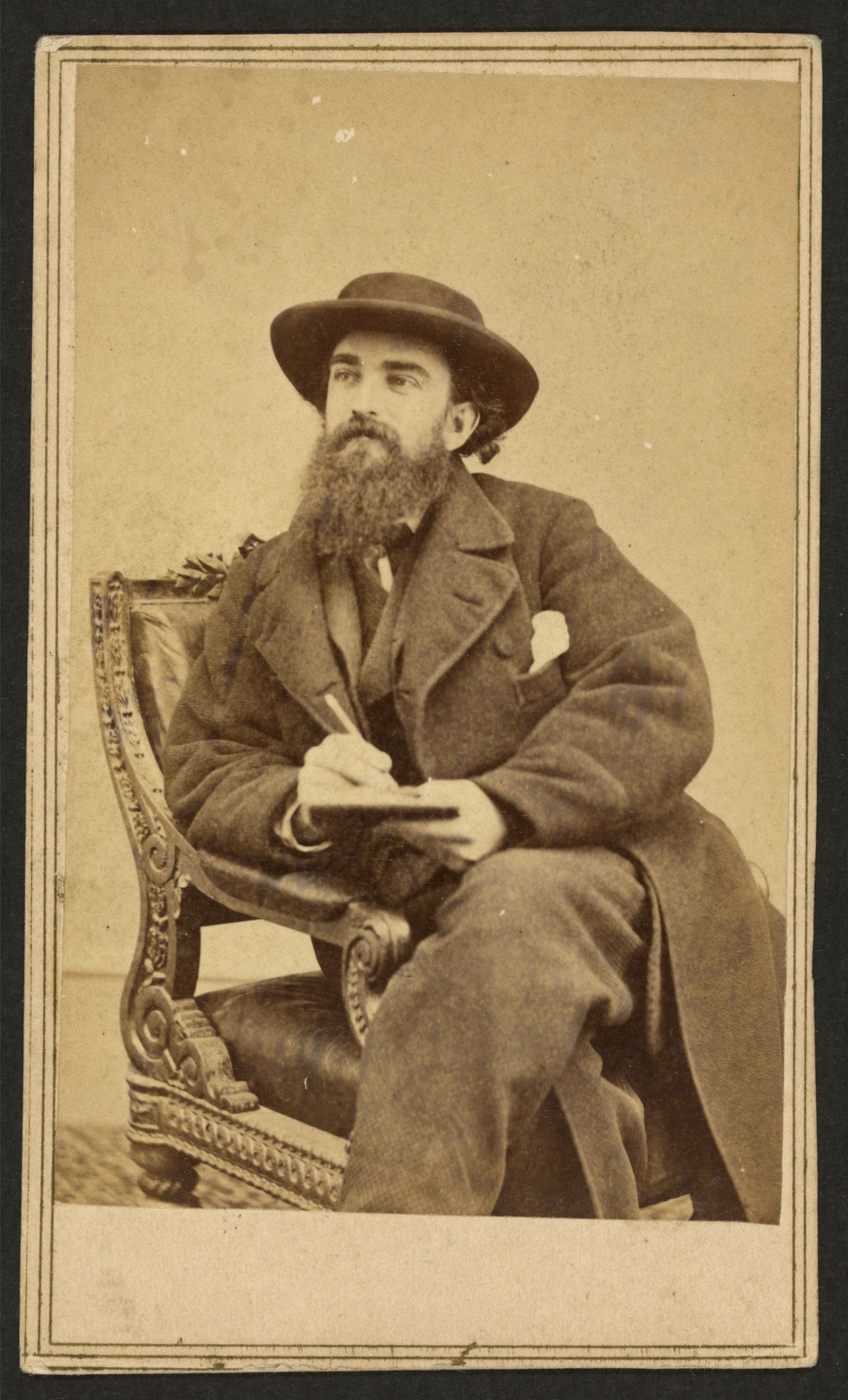
Waud's photograph, Alfred Waud, full-length portrait, seated, holding a pencil and pad, facing left, taken in July 1863 for Harper's Weekly photographer Alexander Gardner in Washington D.C.

Waud was christened Alfred Robert Waud, but later used Rudolph as a middle name while living in the United States. He was the eldest son of Alfred Waud Sr., born London 1796, and his wife Mary (née) Fitz-John, born 1806 in Lougher, near Swansea, South Wales. Waud had four siblings: Mary Pricilla, born 1829; William, born 1831; Julia, born 1834; and Josephine, born 1840. The last two sisters never married. Mary Pricilla married Augustus Cory Scoles in London in 1862.

Waud trained at the Government School of Design at Somerset House, London, with the intention of becoming a marine painter. He did not achieve this but, as a student, he also worked as a painter of theatrical scenery. He intended to pursue that work in the United States when he immigrated in 1850; he sought employment with actor and playwright John Brougham. In the 1850s, Waud worked variously as an illustrator for a Boston periodical, the Carpet-Bag, and illustrated books such as Hunter's Panoramic Guide from Niagara to Quebec (1857).

In 1850, Waud sailed from London aboard the sailing ship Hendrik Hudson, bound for New York City. His brother William followed in 1855 aboard the sailing ship Hermann, also bound for New York.

Waud married Mary Gertrude Jewell from New York in 1855 or 1856. They lived in Orange, New Jersey, where they raised their family. Waud was naturalized as an American citizen on January 10, 1870.

== Career ==
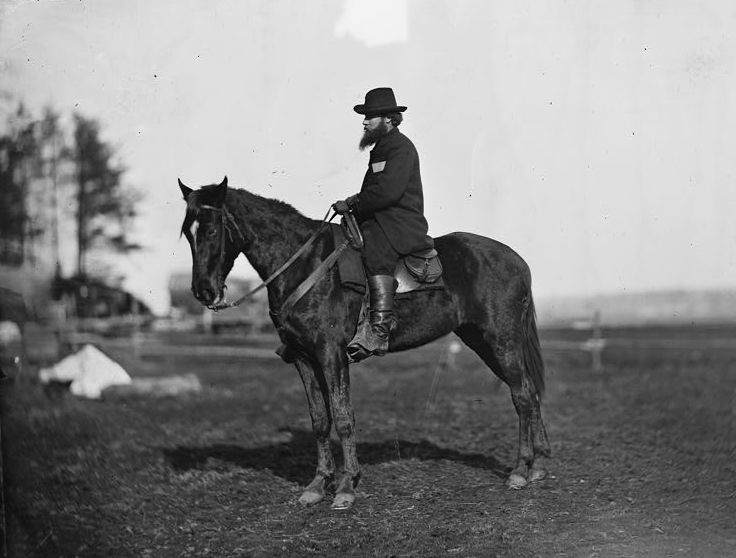
Waud (seated on a horse) at a headquarters of the Army of the Potomac in Brandy Station, Virginia during the American Civil War in February 1864

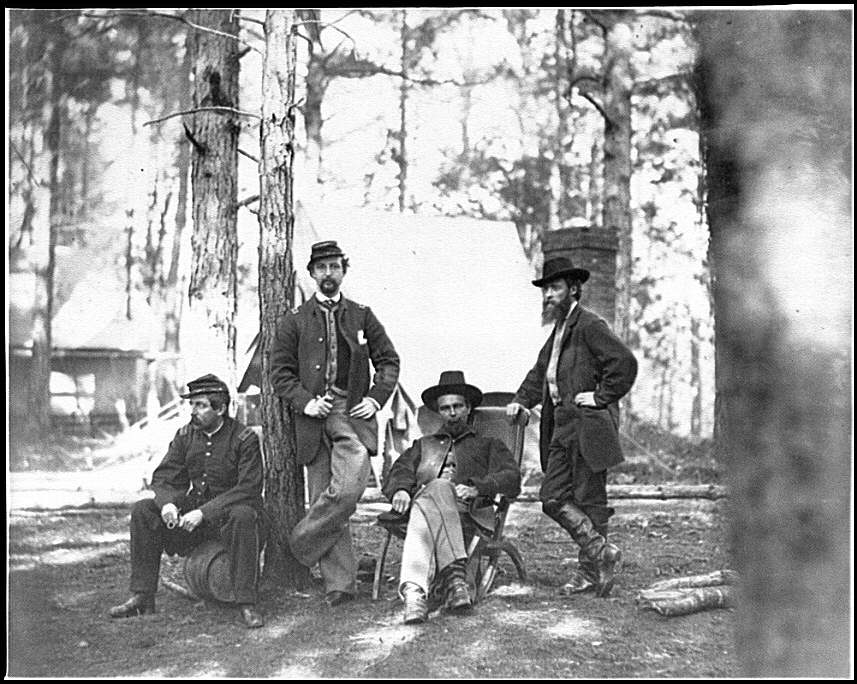
Waud with Army of the Potomac officers in Brandy Station, Virginia

During the American Civil War, published images in newspapers and media were hand drawn and engraved by skilled artists. Photography existed but no method existed to transfer a photograph to a printing plate; this was well before the advent of the halftone process for printing photographs. Photographic equipment was too cumbersome and exposure times were too slow to be used on the battlefield. Waud made detailed sketches in the field, which were rushed by courier back to the main office of the newspaper, where engravers used them to create engravings on blocks of boxwood. Since the blocks were about 4 inches across, they had to be composited together to make one large illustration. The wood engraving was copied via the electrotype process, which produced a metal printing plate to use in publication.

In 1860, Waud became an illustratorfor the New York Illustrated News. In April 1861, the newspaper assigned Waud to cover the Army of the Potomac, Virginia's main Union army. He first illustrated General Winfield Scott in Washington, D.C. He entered the field to render the First Battle of Bull Run in July. Waud followed a Union expedition to Cape Hatteras, North Carolina the next month and witnessed the Battle of Hatteras Inlet Batteries. That autumn, he sketched army activity in the Tidewater region of Virginia. Waud joined Harper's Weekly toward the end of 1861, continuing to cover the war. In 1864 Alfred's brother, William Waud (who up to that time had been working with "Frank Leslie's Illustrated Newspaper"), joined Alfred on the staff of Harper's. The two men worked together during the Petersburg Campaign.

Waud visited every battle of the Army of the Potomac between the First Battle of Bull Run in 1861 through the Siege of Petersburg in 1865. He was one of only two artists present at the Battle of Gettysburg, which proved both the Civil War's deadliest and most decisive battle. Waud's depiction of Pickett's Charge is thought to be the only such depiction based on a visual account.

== Post Civil War work ==
Waud continued to be a prolific illustrator, doing numerous illustrations for Harper's Weekly, where he drew his “The Freedmen’s Bureau”, a piece dedicated to promote Freedmen's Bureau that was past the previous year. During this time he also created many other prominent publications. He achieved his greatest fame in his post-war work.

Waud died in 1891 in Marietta, Georgia, while touring battlefields of the South.

== Artwork ==
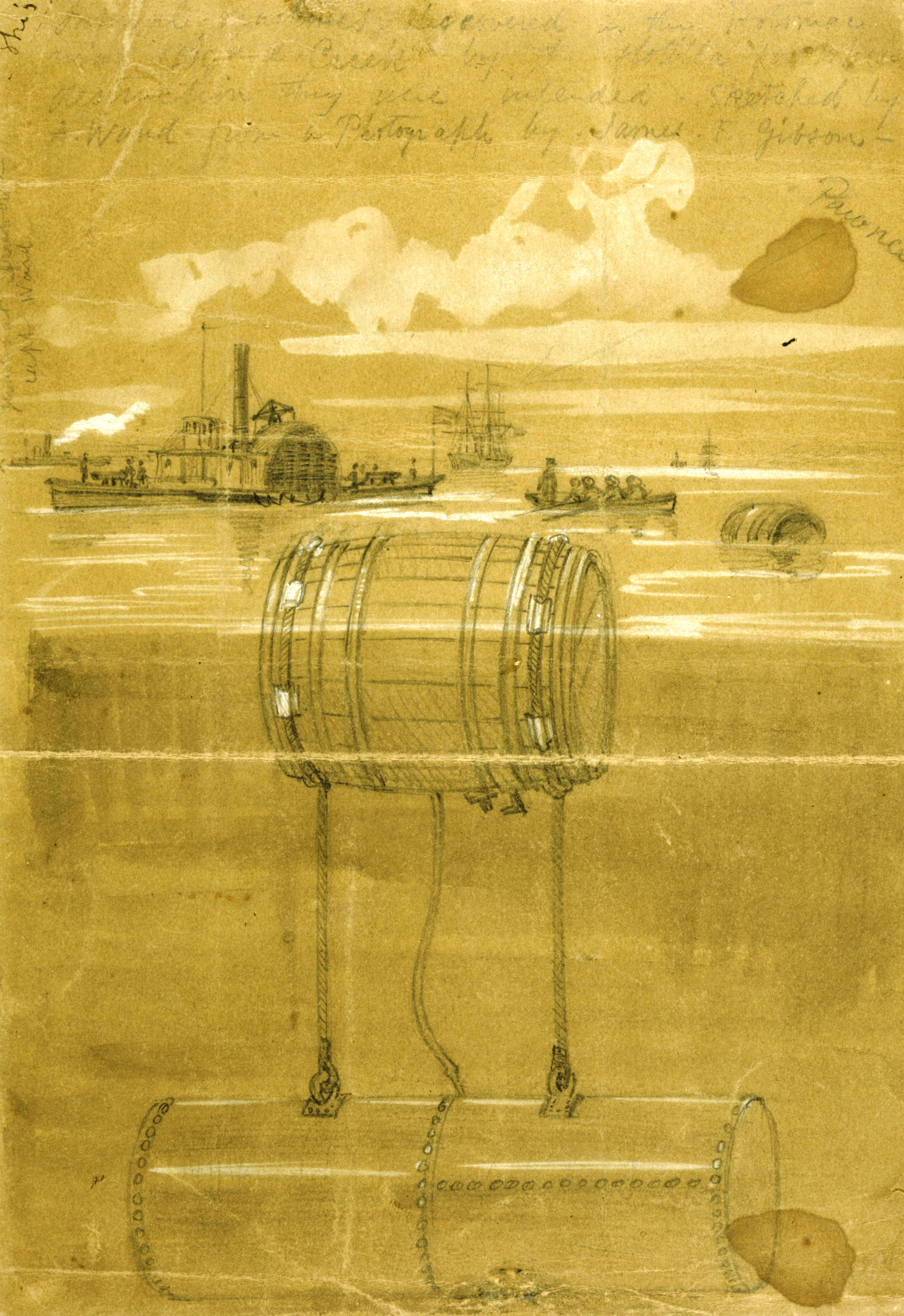
Inscribed above Image:Infernal machines discovered in the Potomac [near Aquia] Creek by the flotilla for whose destruction they were intended. July 22, 1861, p. 177 (Cover)

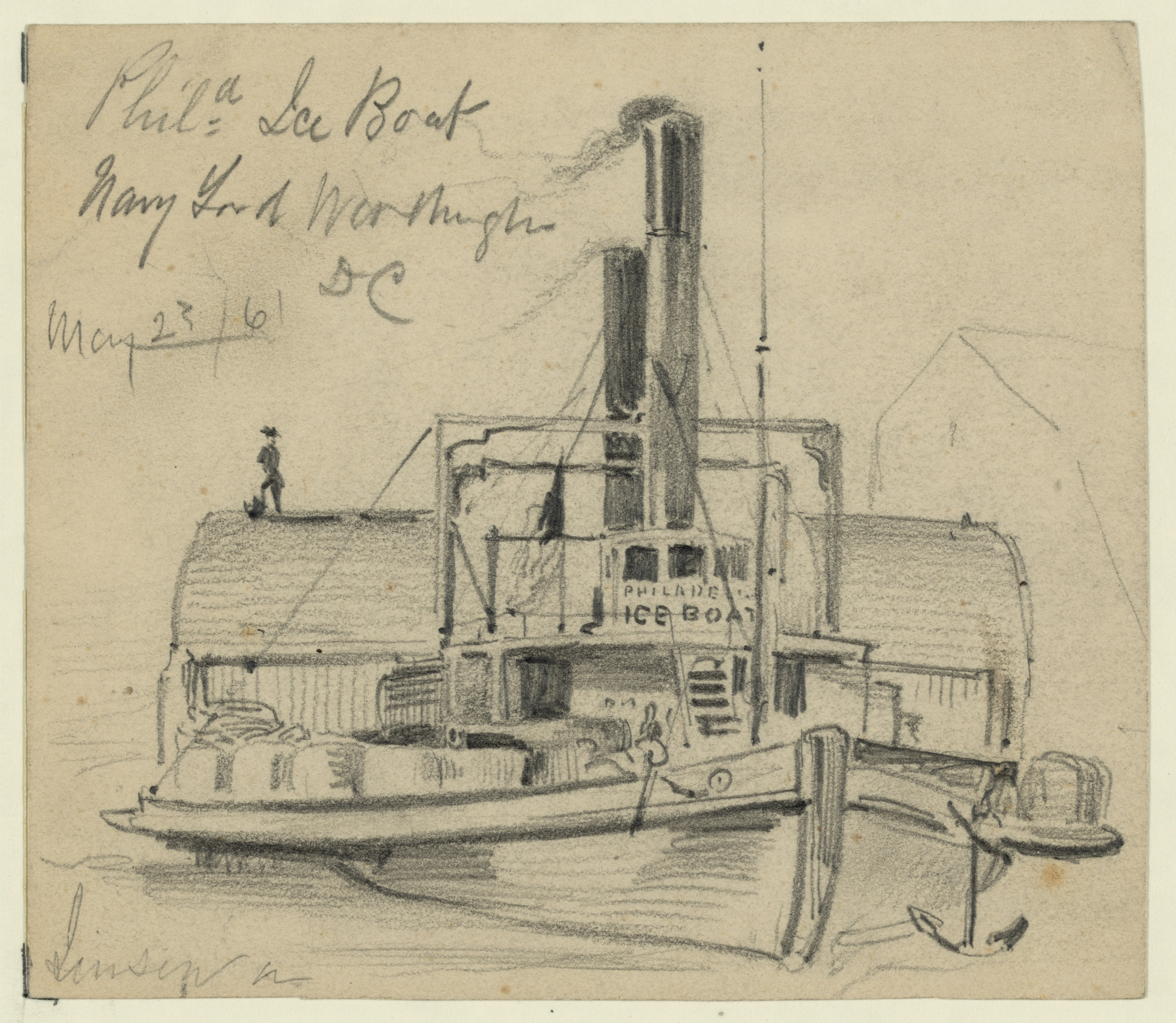
Drawing shows the U.S.S. Ice Boat docked at the Washington Navy Yard in Washington DC on May 23, 1861

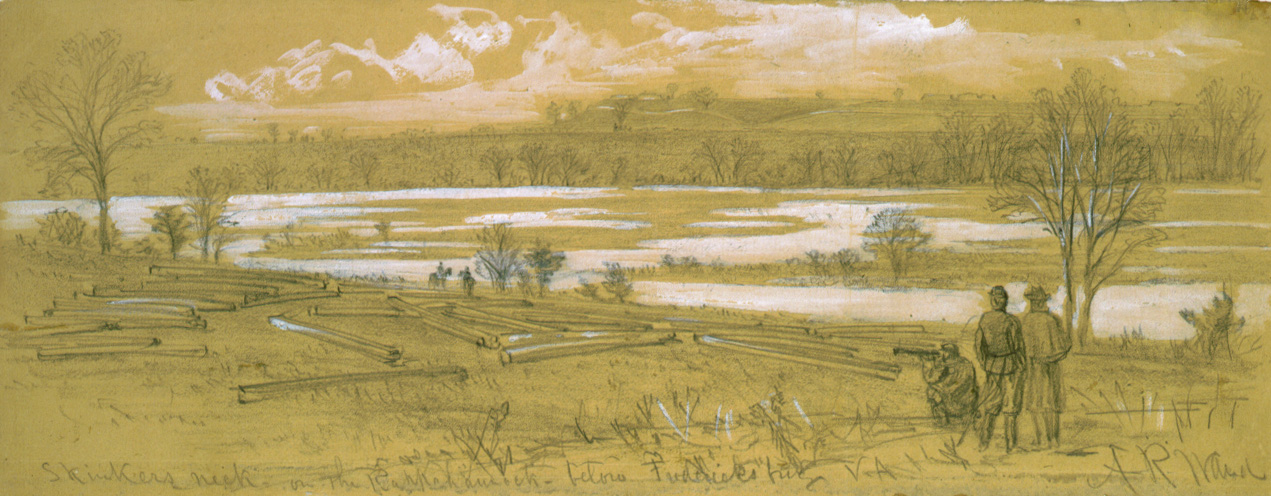
Skinkers Neck on the Rappanhannock River below Fredericksburg, VA (1862)

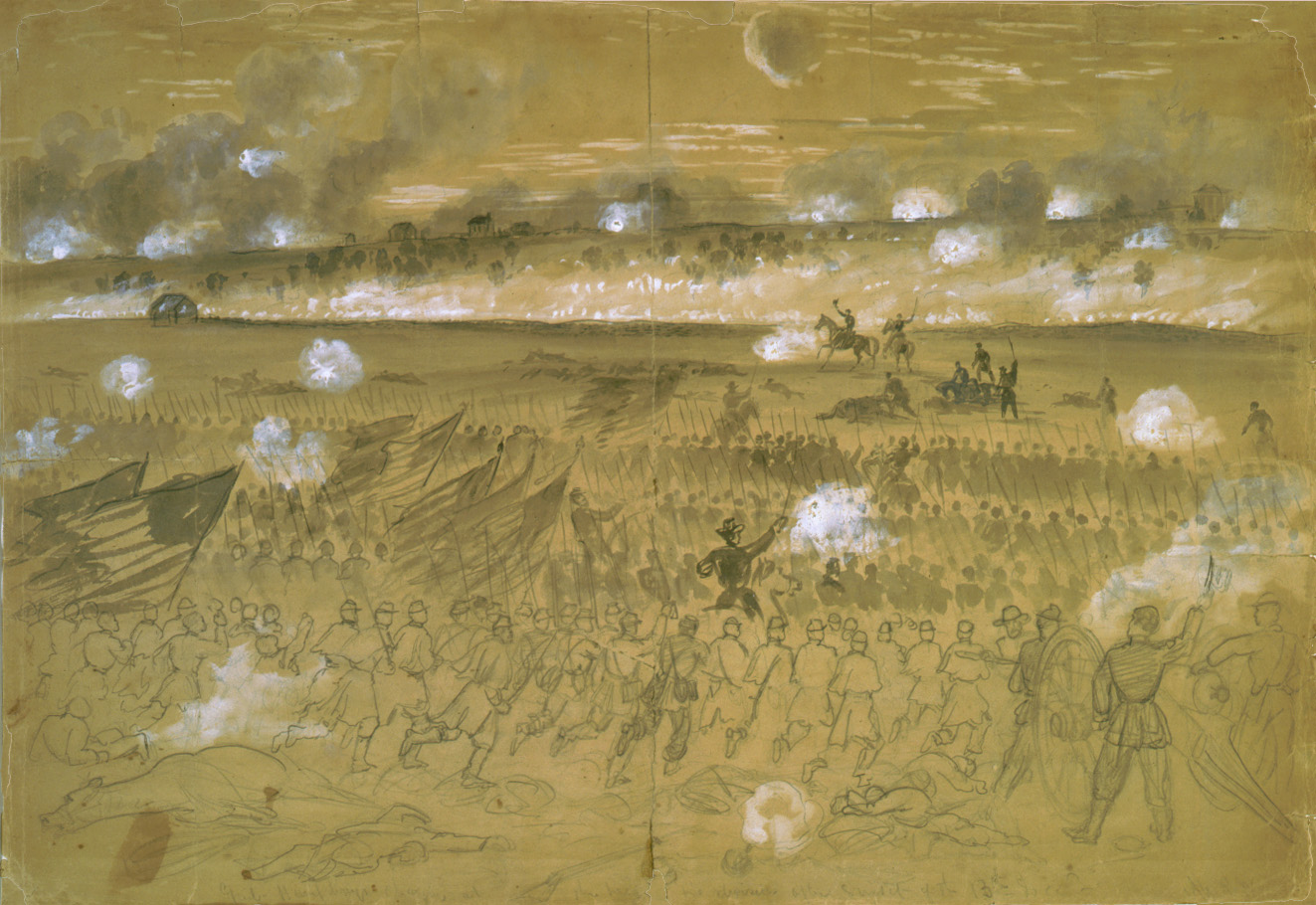
Union General Humphrey charging during the battle of Fredericksburg of the American Civil War (1862)

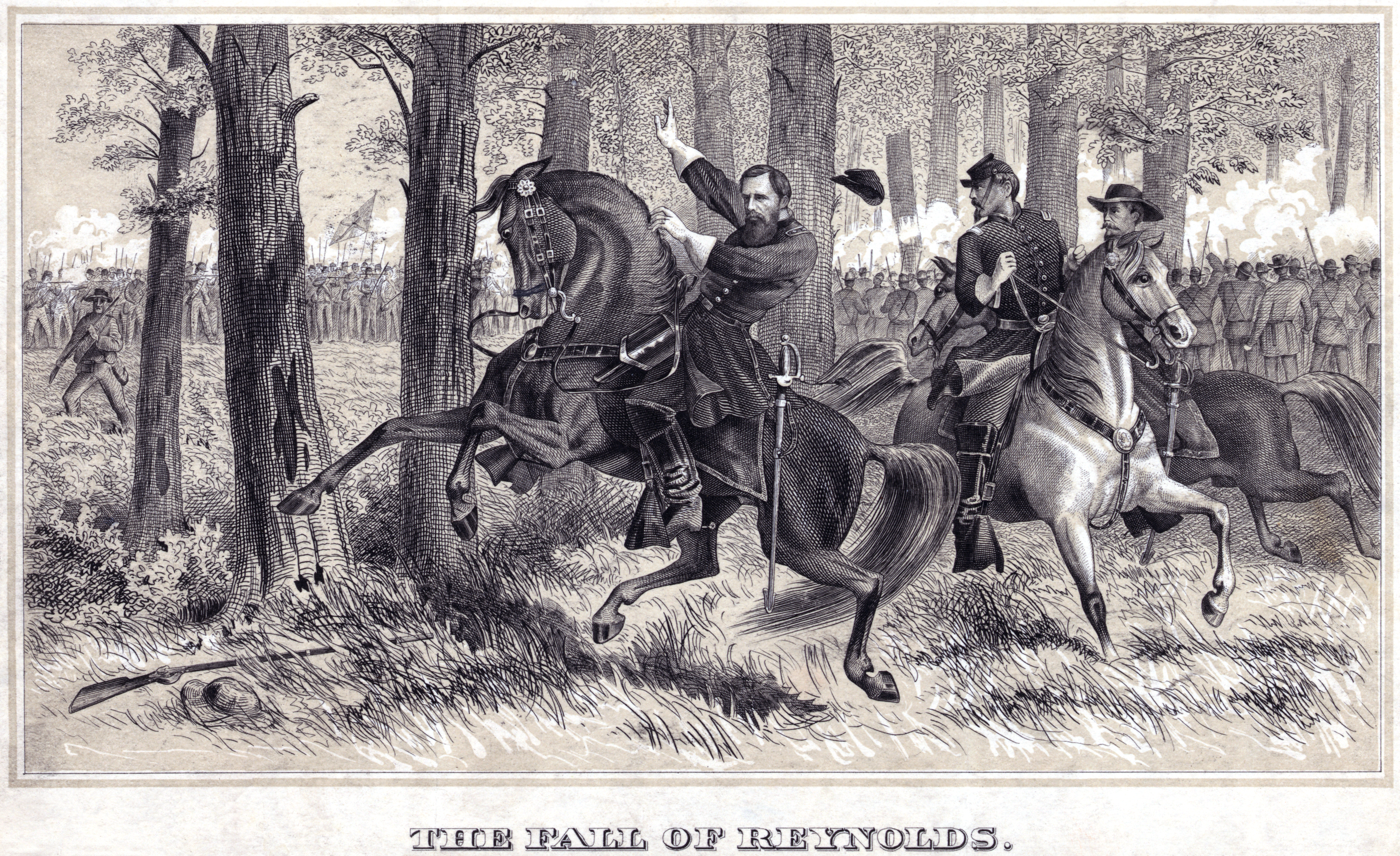
The Fall of Reynolds - The death of John Fulton Reynolds at the Battle of Gettysburg in 1863, depicted by Alfred Rudolph Waud (July 1, 1863)

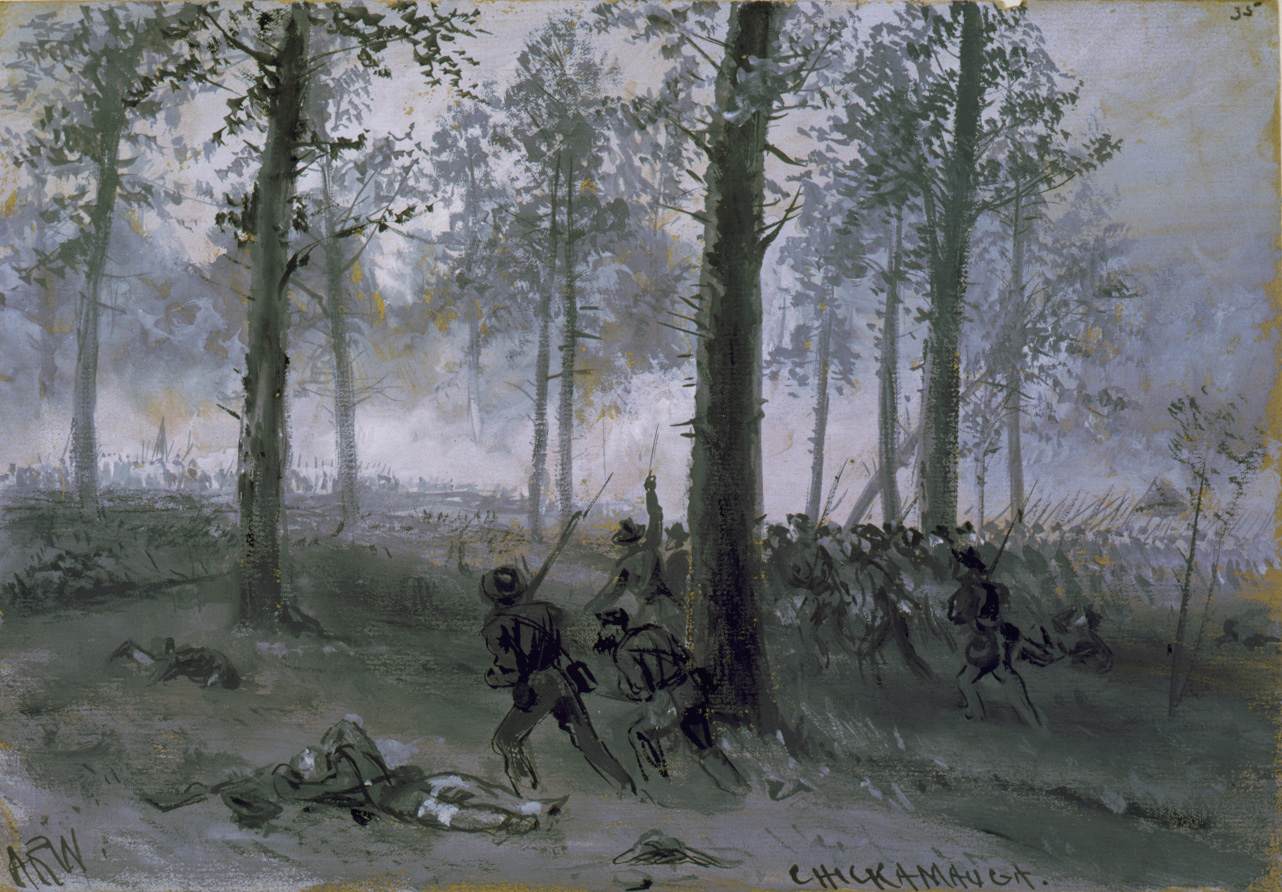
Battle of Chickamauga, Confederate line advancing up hill through forest toward Union line by Alfred Waud (September 20, 1863)

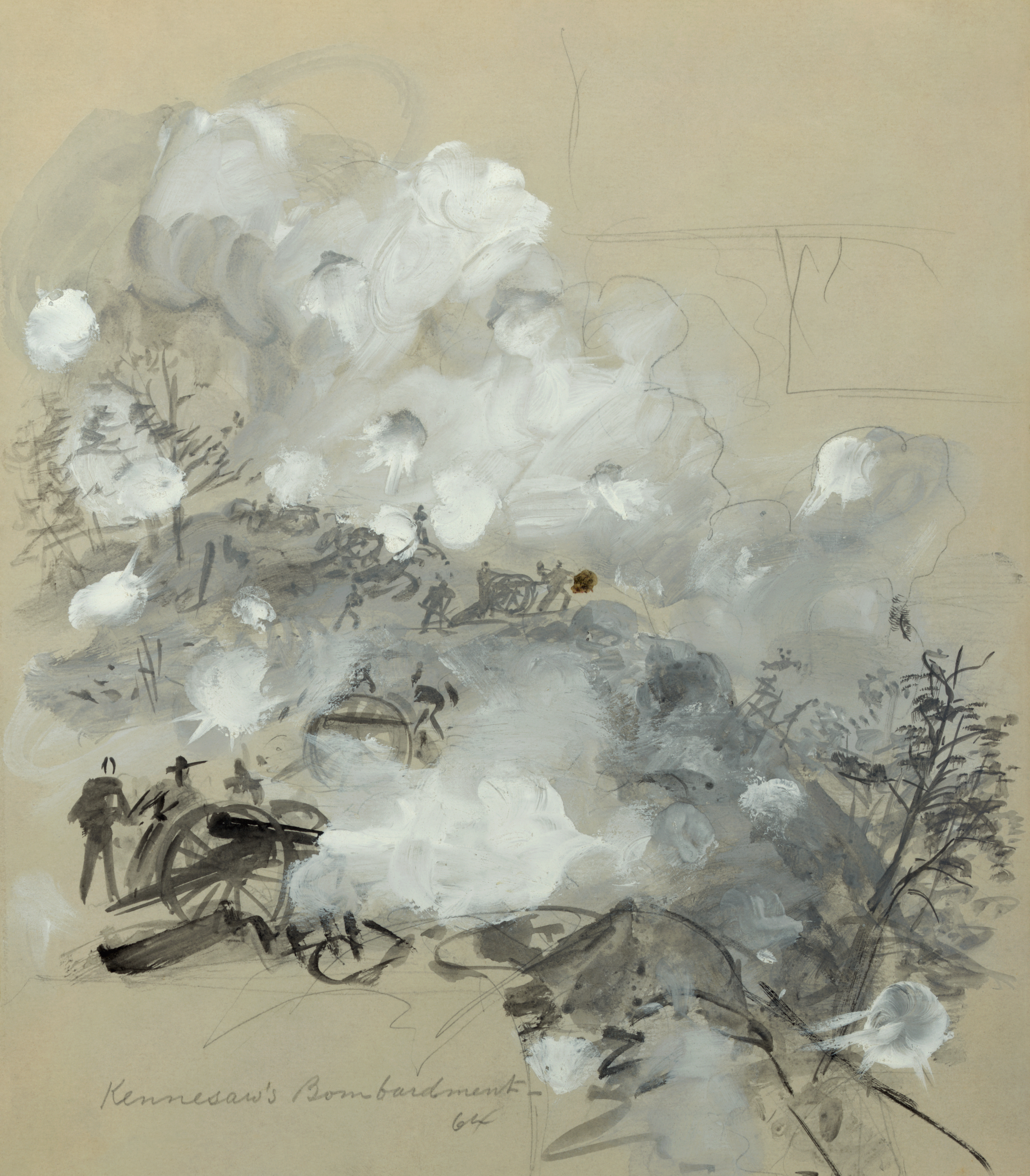
"Kennesaw's Bombardment, 64", sketch of the Battle of Kennesaw Mountain, scanned from the original and digitally restored.

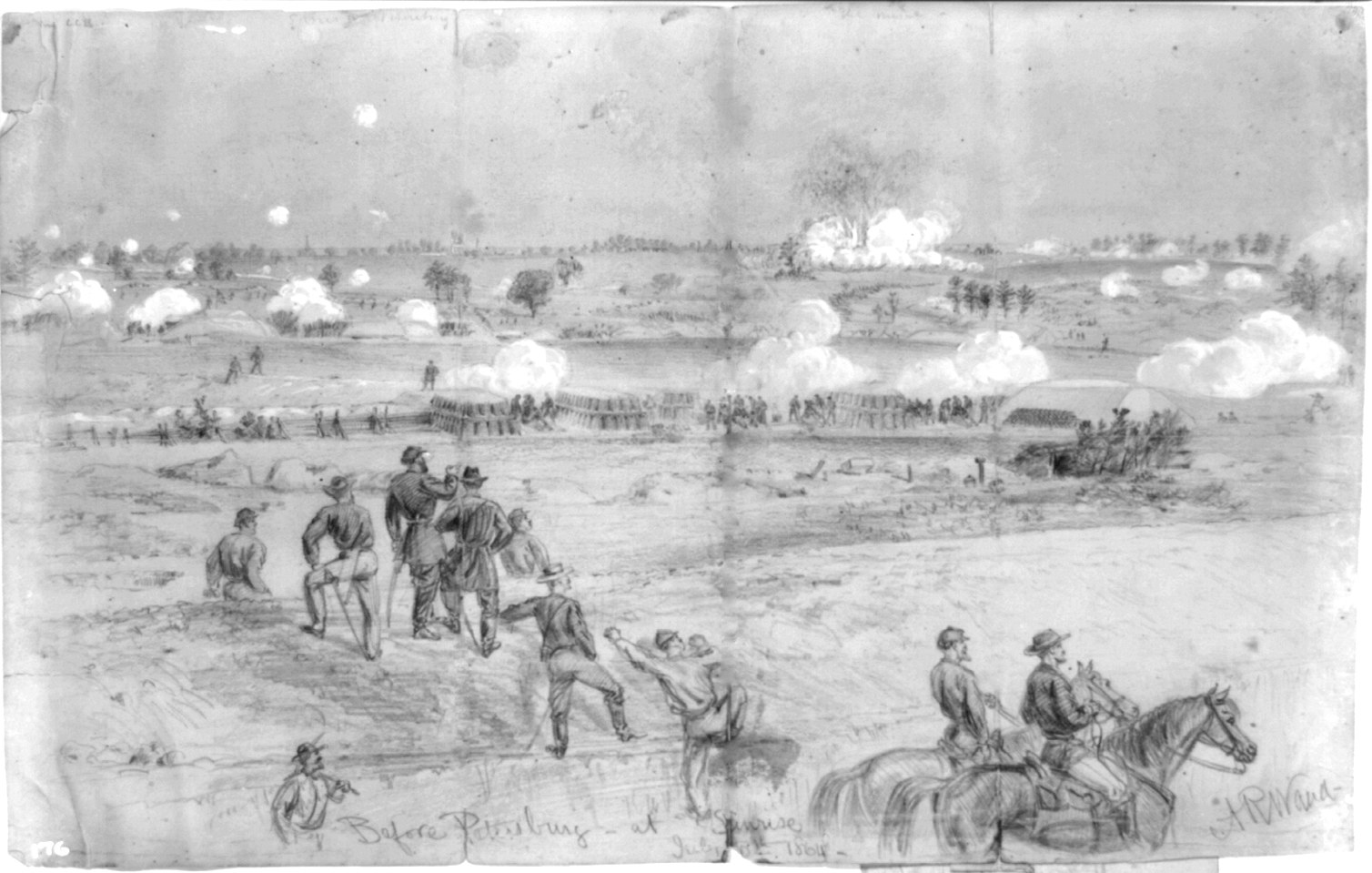
Before Petersburg at sunrise, July 30, 1864, Spires in Petersburg. The mine.

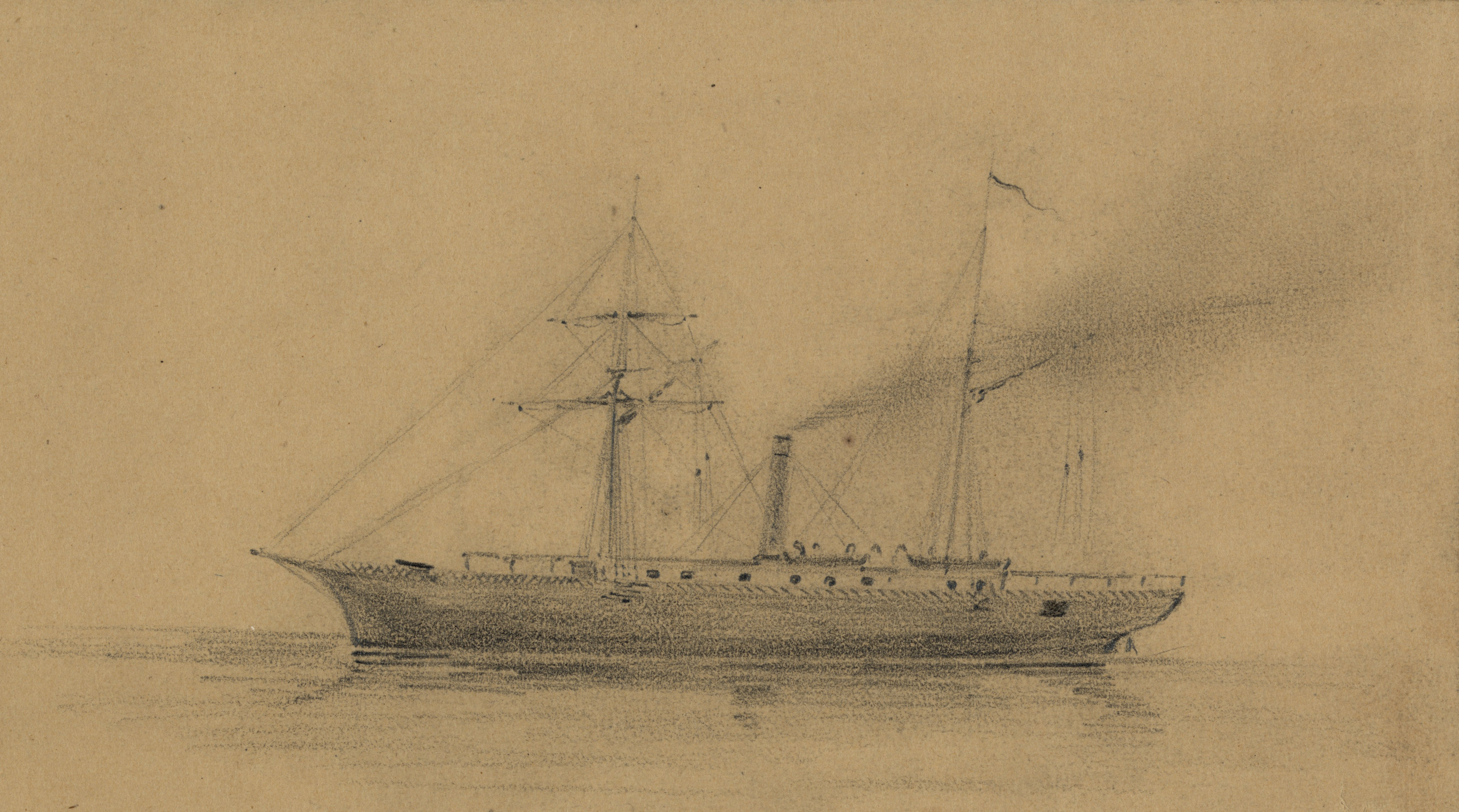
The gunboat USS Monticello in service during the American Civil War. Prior to the war she was a merchant steamship.

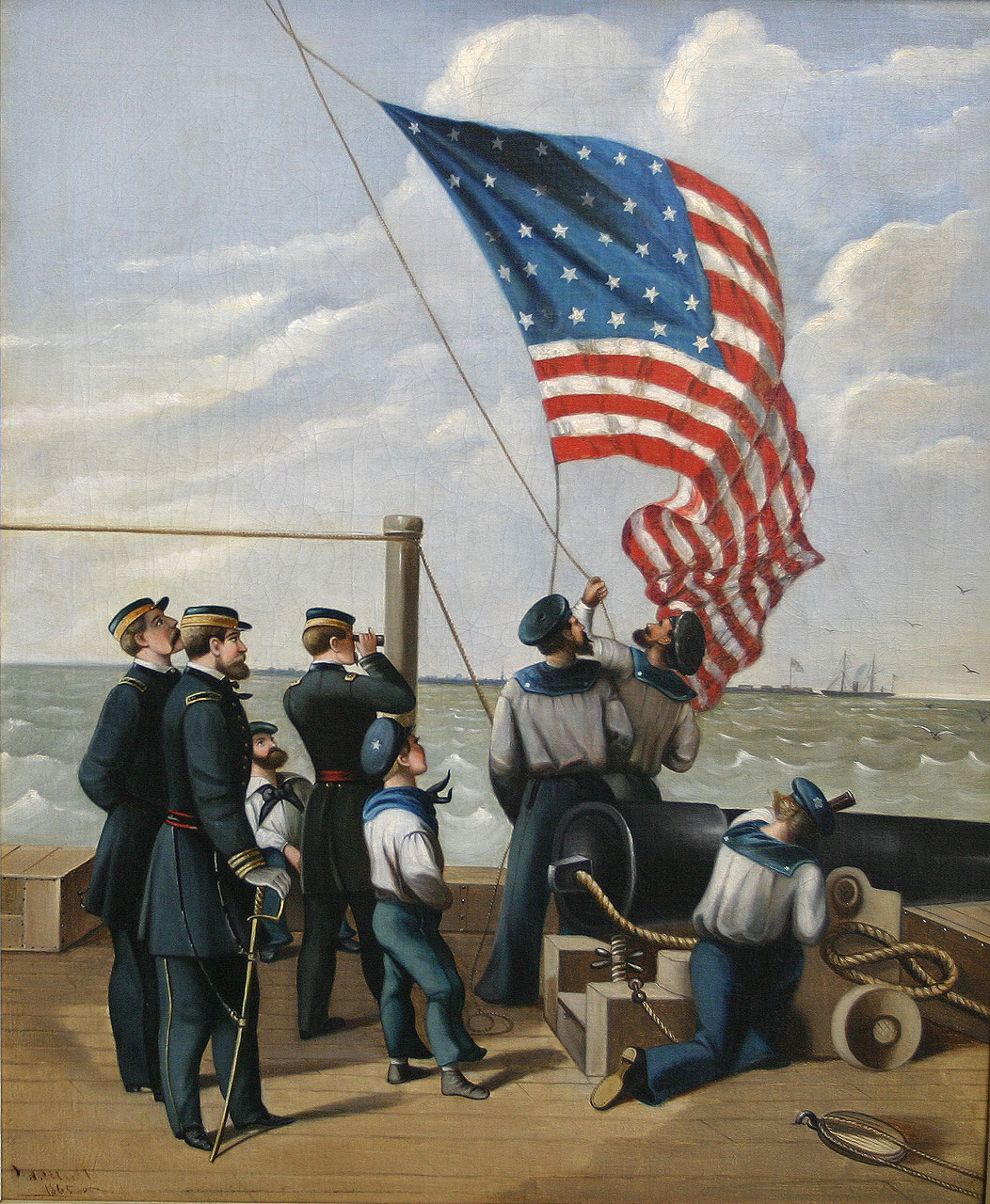
Painting of Gun Boats Blockade Mobile Bay, Alabama, Our Flag is There, by Alfred Rudolph Waud (1865)

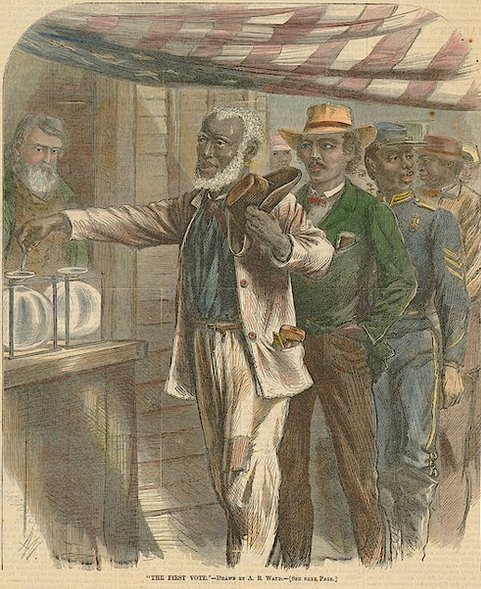
African Americans vote for the first time, as depicted in 1867 on the cover of Harper's magazine. Engraving by Alfred R. Waud (1867)

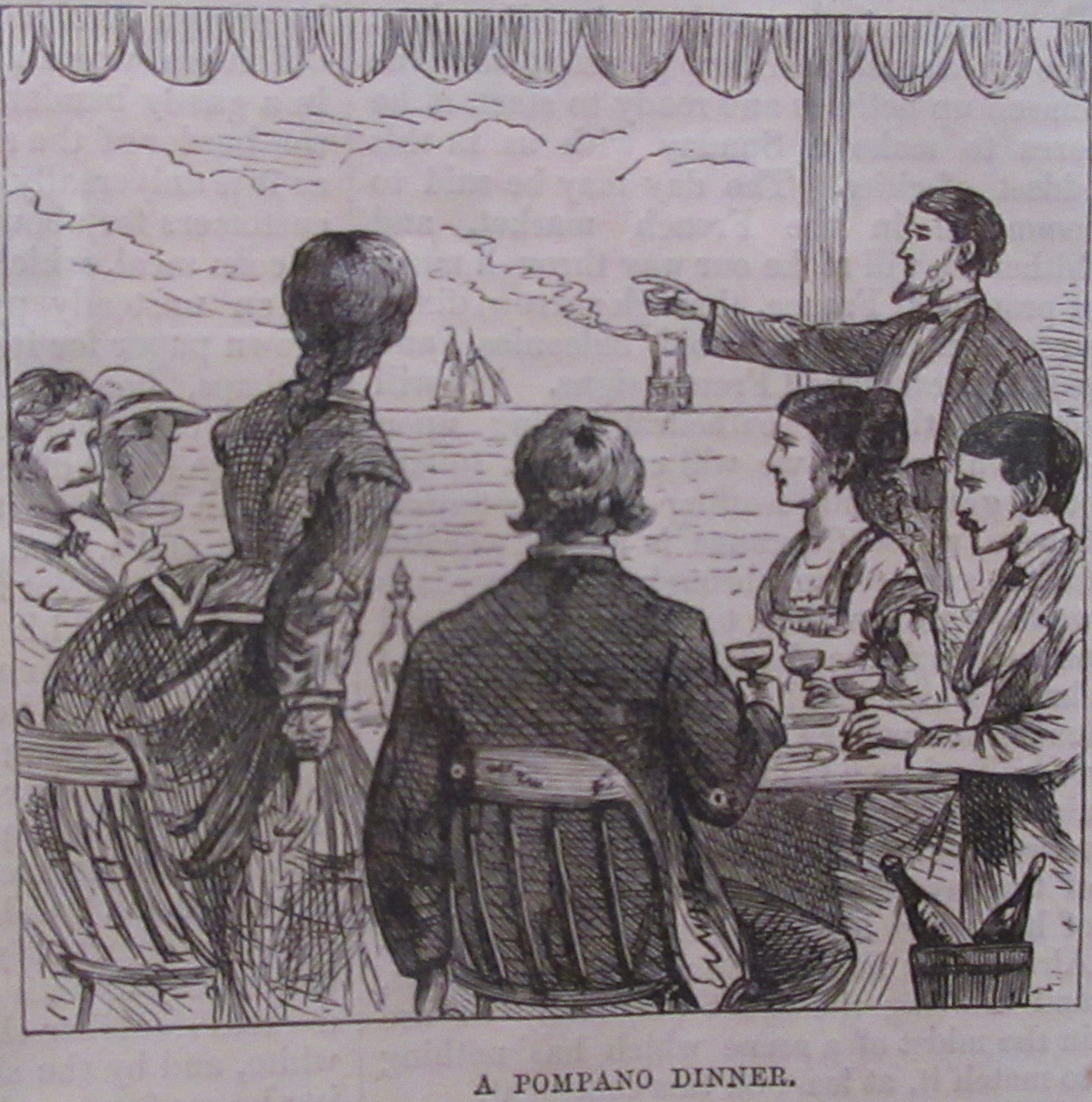
Sunday in New Orleans 1871 by Alfred Waud - A Pompano Dinner - Engraving in "Every Saturday", publication date 15 July 1871. Photographed from reproduction on display at the Historic New Orleans Collection

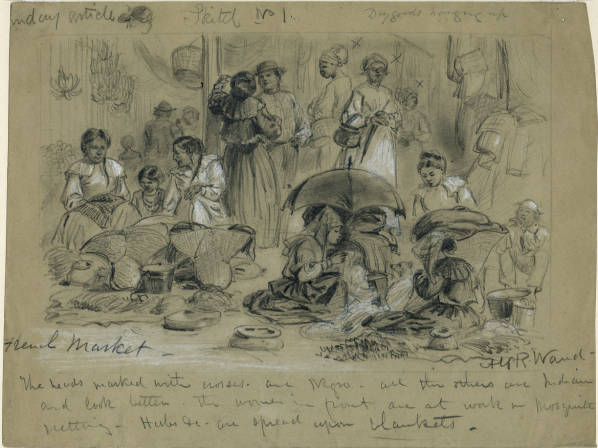
French Market, New Orleans, sketch by A. R. Waud, 1871

== Collections ==
- Library of Congress
