= List of shipwrecks in October 1872 =

The list of shipwrecks in October 1872 includes ships sunk, foundered, grounded, or otherwise lost during October 1872.

== 1 October ==
List of shipwrecks: 1 October 1872
Ship	State	Description
British Queen	United Kingdom	The tug sank at Tranmere, Cheshire. Her crew were rescued.
Brunswick	United Kingdom	The ship was abandoned off Moelfre, Anglesey. Her crew were rescued. She was on a voyage from Dublin to Garston, Lancashire.
Delta	United Kingdom	The barque ran aground at Newcastle, United States. She was on a voyage from Maryport, Cumberland to Philadelphia, Pennsylvania, United States.
Magdala	United Kingdom	The ship was driven ashore and wrecked on Ameland, Friesland, Netherlands. Her 20-plus crew survived. She was on a voyage from Saint Petersburg, Russia to London.
Olga	Greece	The brig was wrecked on the English Bank, in the River Plate. She was on a voyage from Marseille, Bouches-du-Rhône, France to Buenos Aires, Argentina.
Saxon	Norway	The brig was wrecked in Morant Bay. Her crew were rescued. she was on a voyage from Liverpool, Lancashire, United Kingdom to Belize City, British Honduras.
St. Bradock	United Kingdom	The ship sank off Heligoland. She was on a voyage from Hamburg, Germany to Maldon, Essex.
Wabeno	Canada	The ship was driven ashore and wrecked at Port Ellen, Islay, United Kingdom. Her crew were rescued. She was on a voyage from Bangor, Caernarfonshire to Boston, Massachusetts, United States.

== 2 October ==
List of shipwrecks: 2 October 1872
Ship	State	Description
Atlantic	Sweden	The ship was driven ashore. She was on a voyage from Ljusne to Bristol, Gloucestershire, United Kingdom. She was refloated and taken in to Stockholm in a leaky condition.
Edward	United Kingdom	The ship was wrecked on the Bjorn Rock, She was on a voyage from Gävle, Sweden to London. She was refloated on 9 October and towed in to Gävle.

== 3 October ==
List of shipwrecks: 3 October 1872
Ship	State	Description
Amanda	United Kingdom	The brigantine was driven ashore at Portrush, County Antrim. Her seven crew were rescued by the Portrush Lifeboat.
Amelia	United Kingdom	The brig struck the Corton Sands, in the North Sea off the coast of Suffolk and was abandoned by her crew, who were rescued. Amelia was on a voyage from South Shields, County Durham to London. She was towed in to Grimsby, Lincolnshire on 5 October by the steamship Eugenie (United Kingdom).
Ann and Mary	United Kingdom	The ship foundered on the Arklow Bank, in the Irish Sea off the coast of County Wicklow. Her crew got aboard the Arklow Lightship ( Trinity House), from where they were rescued on 5 October. Ann and Mary was on a voyage from Dublin to Gloucester.
Eagle	United States	The steamship was driven ashore at "Chance Cave". She was refloated.
George Carins	United Kingdom	The steamship capsized off and sank 30 nautical miles (56 km) south south east of the Low Point Lighthouse, Nova Scotia, Canada with the loss of eight of her 21 crew. Survivors were rescued by the schooner Three Sisters ( Canada). George Carins was on a voyage from Montreal, Quebec, Canada to Limerick.
Möwe	Germany	The barque was driven ashore on Skagen, Denmark. She was on a voyage from Newcastle upon Tyne, Northumberland, United Kingdom to Swinemünde. She was refloated and resumed her voyage.
N. Mosher	United States	The ship ran aground on the Burbo Bank, in Liverpool Bay. She was on a voyage from Liverpool, Lancashire, United Kingdom to Pensacola, Florida. She was refloated and put back to Liverpool in a severely leaky condition.
Queen of the Fleet	United Kingdom	The barque was driven ashore on Puffin Island, Anglesey. She was refloated but drove ashore at Beaumaris, Anglesey. Queen of the Fleet was again refloated and beached on the coast of Caernarfonshire opposite Beaumaris.
Wybren Romer	Germany	The ship was driven ashore. She was on a voyage from Cowes, Isle of Wight, United Kingdom to Harburg. She was refloated and taken in to Cowes in a leaky condition.

== 4 October ==
List of shipwrecks: 4 October 1872
Ship	State	Description
Amelia	United Kingdom	The brig was discovered on the Cross Sand, in the North Sea off the coast of Suffolk by the steamship Eugenie (United Kingdom). She was towed in to Grimsby, Lincolnshire.
Anna Digna	Netherlands	The ship was lost in the Macassar Strait. Her crew were rescued. She was on a voyage from Newcastle upon Tyne, Northumberland, United Kingdom to Hong Kong.
Eliza	United Kingdom	The brig was abandoned. Her crew were rescued by the Thurso Lifeboat. She was on a voyage from Riga, Russia to Belfast, County Antrim.
Cresswell	United Kingdom	The steamship ran aground at Enos, Ottoman Empire. She was on a voyage from Berdyanski, Russia to Cork. She was later refloated and resumed her voyage.
Margaret Deer	United Kingdom	The fishing smack was run down and sunk by the steamship C. M. Palmer (United Kingdom) at South Shields, County Durham with the loss of one of her seven crew. The smack was on a voyage from Buckhaven, Fife to Great Yarmouth, Norfolk.
Mary Holland	United Kingdom	The brigantine was abandoned. Her crew were rescued by the Thurso Lifeboat. She was on a voyage from Riga to Belfast.
Megaera	United Kingdom	The ship was driven ashore and wrecked at "Slangkoss", Cape Colony. Her crew were rescued.
Unnamed	United Kingdom	The smack ran aground on the Arklow Bank, in the Irish Sea off the coast of County Wicklow.

== 5 October ==
List of shipwrecks: 5 October 1872
Ship	State	Description
Elgin	United Kingdom	The steamship ran aground on the Bukkelyne Bank and was damaged. She was refloated and taken in to Ålesund, Denmark in a leaky condition.
Jantina	Netherlands	The ship ran aground off "Lappen", Denmark. She was on a voyage from Fraserburgh, Aberdeenshire, United Kingdom to Stettin, Germany.
Jupiter	Germany	The barque was driven ashore in Table Bay. She was on a voyage from Montevideo, Uruguay to Cape Town, Cape Colony. She was refloated.
Kurkvaart	Germany	The ship was wrecked near Lemvig, Norway. She was on a voyage from London, United Kingdom to Danzig.
Little Western	United Kingdom	The steamship struck a rock off Samson, Isles of Scilly and sank. Her crew were rescued. She was on a voyage from Penzance, Cornwall to the Isles of Scilly.
Merit	United States	The ship was driven ashore and wrecked at "Forchet Head". She was on a voyage from Saint John's, Newfoundland Colony to "Camuli".
Ocean	United Kingdom	The ship was taken in to Bristol, Gloucestershire in a derelict condition. She had been on a voyage from Newport, Monmouthshire to Cork.
Peri	United Kingdom	The steamship ran aground on the Haisborough Sands, in the North Sea off the coast of Norfolk. She was on a voyage from Newcastle upon Tyne, Northumberland to Dunkirk, Nord, France. She was refloated and taken in to Great Yarmouth, Norfolk in a severely leaky condition.
Phoenix	United Kingdom	The ship ran aground on The Shingles, off the Isle of Wight. She was on a voyage from Falmouth, Cornwall to Grimsby, Lincolnshire.
Reserve	France	The ship was largely abandoned off Cape Horn, Chile. Eighteen of her 23 crew were taken off by Hvideorn (Flag unknown), the rest refused to abandon ship. Reserve was on a voyage from South Shields, County Durham, United Kingdom to Callao, Peru.
Veritas	United States	The ship was driven ashore at "Malarie". She was on a voyage from "Malarie" to Belfast, County Antrim, United Kingdom.
Unnamed	United Kingdom	The ship was driven ashore and wrecked at Nairn.

== 6 October ==
List of shipwrecks: 6 October 1872
Ship	State	Description
Alicia	United Kingdom	The ship was driven ashore and sank at "Melstaby", on the east coast of Öland, Sweden.
Dorris	United Kingdom	The smack ran aground and sank in the River Nene upstream of Sutton Bridge, Lincolnshire. She was on a voyage from Sunderland, County Durham to Tydd St. Giles, Cambridgeshire.
Friendship	United Kingdom	The ship was abandoned between the Tuskar Rock and the Smalls Lighthouse. Her crew were rescued. She was on a voyage from New York to Cork.
Onward	United Kingdom	The schooner sprang a leak and was beached at Ryde, Isle of Wight. She was on a voyage from Teignmouth, Devon to Leith, Lothian.

== 7 October ==
List of shipwrecks: 7 October 1872
Ship	State	Description
Amelia, and Susan Bayley	United States; United Kingdom	The barque Amelia collided with the brig Susan Bayley in the English Channel off the Lizard, Cornwall, United Kingdom. Susan Bailey sank. Amelia was severely damaged. She was then run into by the full-rigged ship Aime (Germany) and was further damaged. Amelia was on a voyage from Havre de Grâce, Seine-Inférieure, France to New York. She put in to Plymouth, Devon, United Kingdom.
Amy Serena	United Kingdom	The brig departed from Liverpool, Lancashire for Limerick. No further trace, presumed foundered with the loss of all hands.
Bengalese	United Kingdom	The steamship ran aground at Hamburg, Germany.
Clara	United Kingdom	The brig was driven ashore and wrecked at Ballyquinton Point, County Down. Her crew were rescued. She was on a voyage from Ardrossan, Ayrshire to Dublin.
Lina	Russia	The brig was driven ashore at Troup Head, Aberdeenshire, United Kingdom. She was on a voyage from Fraserburgh, Aberdeenshire to a Baltic port.
Lutin	France	The barque collided with the steamship La Pampa (Italy) and became waterlogged in the Mediterranean Sea off Europa Point, Gibraltar. Her crew were rescued by La Pampa. Lutin was on a voyage from Marseille, Bouches-du-Rhône to Whydah, Africa. She was towed in to Gibraltar by Endymion (Royal Navy) and anchored at the Mole. She subsequently sank whilst under tow by the tugs Jackal and Works (both (United Kingdom of Great Britain and Ireland) Gibraltar).
Maida	United Kingdom	The brig foundered in the North Sea. Her crew survived. She was on a voyage from Sunderland, County Durham to Bremen, Germany.
Mary	United Kingdom	The brigantine struck the pier at Workington, Cumberland and was wrecked. She was on a voyage from Workington to Belfast, County Antrim.
Palermo	United Kingdom	The ship was driven ashore and severely damaged on South Ronaldshay, Orkney Islands. She was on a voyage from Kronstadt, Russia to Liverpool.
Sjofnen	Norway	The ship was wrecked near "Aviken", Sweden. Her crew were rescued. She was on a voyage from Aberdeen, United Kingdom to Sundsvall, Sweden.
Wild Gazelle	United States	The ship was abandoned at sea. Her crew were rescued. She was on a voyage from Baltimore, Maryland to Paysandú, Uruguay.

== 8 October ==
List of shipwrecks: 8 October 1872
Ship	State	Description
John Bunyan	United Kingdom	The ship was wrecked at Sainte-Anne-des-Monts, Quebec, Canada with some loss of life. She was on a voyage from the Clyde to Quebec City, Canada.
Regina	United Kingdom	The barque sprang a leak and was abandoned off Islay, Inner Hebrides. Her crew survived. She was on a voyage from Glasgow, Renfrewshire to Newhaven, Connecticut. She came ashore on Tiree on 12 October.
Scanderia	United Kingdom	The steamship departed from New York, United States for Queenstown, County Cork. No further trace, presumed foundered with the loss of all 45 crew.
Wobena	United Kingdom	The barque was wrecked on Islay. Her crew survived.

== 9 October ==
List of shipwrecks: 9 October 1872
Ship	State	Description
Aldebaran	United Kingdom	The ship ran aground and sank on Seskar, Grand Duchy of Finland. She was on a voyage from Kronstadt, Russia to Hull, Yorkshire.
Ansel Gibbs	United States	The whaler, a barque, was wrecked on Marble Island, Canada with the subsequent loss of some of her crew. Survivors were rescued on 2 August 1873 by the whaling schooner Abbie Bradford (United States).
Elgin	United Kingdom	The steamship was damaged by fire at Aden. She was on a voyage from Sunderland, County Durham to Rangoon, British Burma.
I Due	Italy	The brig was driven ashore west of "Point Elena", near Roquetas de Mar, Spain. Her crew survived.
Mary Jane	United Kingdom	The schooner foundered in the Dogger Bank Her crew were rescued. She was on a voyage from Hamburg, Germany to Berwick upon Tweed, Northumberland.
Princess Louise	Canada	The ship was abandoned in the Atlantic Ocean. Her crew were rescued by the brig Collman (Germany) and she was set afire. Princess Louise was on a voyage from New York, United States to Queenstown, County Cork, United Kingdom.
Themis	United Kingdom	The ship was driven ashore north of Fredrikshavn, Denmark. She was on a voyage from Charlestown, Cornwall to Rudkøbing, Denmark.
Vaflakadis	Ottoman Empire	The ship caught fire and was towed in to the Dardanelles. She was on a voyage from Hull to Galaţi.

== 10 October ==
List of shipwrecks: 10 October 1872
Ship	State	Description
Abbotsford	United Kingdom	The ship was wrecked on the Market Stones Rocks, near "Eckro". She was on a voyage from Lübeck, Germany to Gävle, Sweden.
Arche d'Alliance	France	The ship ran aground off Wells-next-the-Sea, Norfolk, United Kingdom. She was refloated and beached at Blakeney, Norfolk.
Avania	Flag unknown	The crewless schooner foundered in the North Sea.
Cornish	United Kingdom	The ship foundered between Bull Point and the Morte Stone, Devon with the loss of all hands.
Fairy Queen	United Kingdom	The ship was driven ashore and wrecked at Little Haven, Pembrokeshire.
Gulielmo, or Quillelmo	(United Kingdom of Great Britain and Ireland) Jersey	The schooner was abandoned off the mouth of the Humber. Her crew were rescued by a smack. She was on a voyage from South Shields, County Durham to Jersey. She was towed in to Grimsby, Lincolnshire the next day by two smacks.
Gwydir	United Kingdom	The brigantine was wrecked in the Hilbre Islands, Cheshire. Her crew were rescued by Prince of Wales (United Kingdom).
John	United Kingdom	The smack was wrecked on the East Hoyle Bank, in Liverpool Bay. Her crew were rescued by the Hoylake Lifeboat. She was on a voyage from "Port Nant" to Liverpool, Lancashire.
Speedwell	United Kingdom	The steamship was sighted off the coast of Norfolk whilst on a voyage from Ipswich, Suffolk to Hull, Yorkshire. No further trace, presumed foundered with the loss of all hands.
Swallow	United Kingdom	The Mersey Flat was driven ashore near Great Orme Head, Caernarfonshire. Her three crew were rescued by the lifeboat Sisters ( Royal National Lifeboat Institution). Swallow was on a voyage from Penmaenmawr, Caernarfonshire to Liverpool.
Woodlark	United Kingdom	The steamship struck a submerged object and sank at Hartlepool, County Durham. She was on a voyage from Cartagena, Spain to Hartlepool. She was refloated on 14 October.
Zealous	United Kingdom	The steamship was driven ashore near Terneuzen, Zeeland, Netherlands. She was on a voyage from Harwich, Essex to Antwerp, Belgium. She was refloated and completed her voyage.

== 11 October ==
List of shipwrecks: 11 October 1872
Ship	State	Description
Algol	France	The ship put in to Alicante, Spain on fire.
Annie M. Young	United Kingdom	The brig ran aground in the River Mersey. She was refloated with assistance from the tug Knight Templar (United Kingdom) and anchored in the Sloyne.
Ceres	United Kingdom	The sloop was destroyed by fire at Sandsend, Yorkshire.
Confiance	United Kingdom	The ship was lost in the Raz de Sein. She was on a voyage from Bilbao, Spain to Cardiff, Glamorgan.
Elise	Germany	The ship was driven ashore 5 nautical miles (9.3 km) south of Dunbar, Lothian, United Kingdom. Her crew were rescued. She was on a voyage from Hamburg to Burntisland, Fife, United Kingdom.
Elizabeth	United Kingdom	The sloop was wrecked on the Ross Sands, Northumberland. Her three crew were rescued by the Lindisfarne Lifeboat Grace Darling ( Royal National Lifeboat Institution). She was on a voyage from Leith, Lothian to the River Tyne
Hartley	United Kingdom	The brig was wrecked near Marstrand, Sweden. Her crew were rescued. She was on a voyage from Sunderland, County Durham to Copenhagen, Denmark.
John	United Kingdom	The smack ran aground on the East Hoyle Bank, in Liverpool Bay and sank. Her crew were rescued by the Hoylake Lifeboat. She was on a voyage from Nefyn, Caernarfonshire to Liverpool, Lancashire.
Lord Napier	United Kingdom	The brigantine foundered in the Irish Sea 12 nautical miles (22 km) west of Strumble Head, Pembrokeshire with the loss of her captain from her eight crew. She was on a voyage from Casablanca, Morocco to Liverpool.
Malta	Sweden	The ship caught fire. She was on a voyage from Malta to Cardiff, Glamorgan, United Kingdom.
Mary Sweet	United Kingdom	The ship was driven ashore at Larne, County Antrim. She was on a voyage from Newcastle upon Tyne, Northumberland to Londonderry.
Lucy	United Kingdom	The brig was driven ashore and wrecked south of Whitby, Yorkshire. Her crew were rescued. She was on a voyage from Bremerhaven, Germany to Whitby.
R. W. Hodgson	United Kingdom	The steamship ran aground on Taylor's Bank, in Liverpool Bay. She was on a voyage from Liverpool to Cardiff, Glamorgan. She was refloated and put back to Liverpool in leaky condition.
Woodlark	United Kingdom	The steamship struck a submerged object and sank at West Hartlepool, County Durham. She was on a voyage from Cartagena, Spain to West Hartlepool.

== 12 October ==
List of shipwrecks: 12 October 1872
Ship	State	Description
Anne Crowald	Netherlands	The ship ran aground at Brielle, South Holland. She was on a voyage from Rotterdam, South Holland to Bergen, Norway.
Ave Maria	Spain	The ship was wrecked at Legazpi, Spanish East Indies.
Christina	Netherlands	The ship was driven ashore on Terschelling, Friesland. She was on a voyage from Kristiansand, Norway to a Dutch port.
Emilia	United Kingdom	The ship was wrecked at Legazpi.
Francis Hilyard	Canada	The ship ran aground off the coast of Georgia, United States. She was on a voyage from the Clyde to Savannah, Georgia. She was refloated and completed her voyage.
Ignacia	Spain	The ship was wrecked at Legazpi.
Matheran	United Kingdom	The ship foundered off the Old Head of Kinsale, County Cork. She was on a voyage from Greenock, Renfrewshire to Demerara, British Guiana.
Ponon	Spain	The ship was wrecked at Legazpi.
Sharon	(Dominion of Newfoundland) Newfoundland Colony	The ship, which had caught fire the previous day, was abandoned in the Atlantic Ocean. Her crew were rescued by the barque Frey (Norway) and the schooner Enavo (United Kingdom). Sharon was on a voyage from Liverpool, Lancashire, United Kingdom to New York, United States.
Stephen	United Kingdom	The schooner was driven ashore on Texel, North Holland. She was on a voyage from Hoorn, North Holland to Great Yarmouth, Norfolk. She was refloated.

== 13 October ==
List of shipwrecks: 13 October 1872
Ship	State	Description
Albert	United Kingdom	The schooner foundered in the North Sea 6 nautical miles (11 km) south east of Spurn Point, Yorkshire. Her crew survived. She was on a voyage from Sunderland, County Durham to London.
Alfred	United Kingdom	The brigantine sprang a leak and foundered in the North Sea 5 nautical miles (9.3 km) south east by east of the New Sand Lightship ( Trinity House). Her crew were rescued. She was on a voyage from Sunderland to London.
Andrea	Sweden	The ship was driven ashore at Utlängan and was severely damaged. She was on a voyage from Gävle, Sweden to Liverpool, Lancashire, United Kingdom.
Carolina	Sweden	The ship was driven ashore on the east coast of Öland. She was on a voyage from Sundsvall to an English port.
Guatemala	United States of Colombia	The steamship was wrecked at the mouth of the Tonalá River with the loss of 23 lives. She was on a voyage from Acapulco, Mexico to Panama City.
Grecian	United Kingdom	The steamship ran aground at Palermo, Sicily, Italy.
Jagnina	Ottoman Empire	The ship was sighted in the Dardanelles whilst on a voyage from Sulina to a British port. No further trace, presumed foundered with the loss of all hands.
Regent	United Kingdom	The ship was driven ashore on Tiree, Inner Hebrides.

== 14 October ==
List of shipwrecks: 14 October 1872
Ship	State	Description
Emma Kreig	Germany	The brig struck the Blackwater Bank, in the Irish Sea and foundered. Her crew were rescued. She was on a voyage from Liverpool, Lancashire, United Kingdom to Demerara, British Honduras.
Henrique	Portugal	The brigantine was driven ashore at Lagos.
Lady Beatrice	United Kingdom	The brig was driven ashore and wrecked on Goeree, Zeeland, Netherlands.
Lucretia	United Kingdom	The smack departed from Newhaven, Sussex for Runcorn, Cheshire. Presumed subsequently foundered off Portland, Dorset with the loss of all three crew; a boat and other wreckage from the smack washed up there.
Margaret	United Kingdom	The ship ran aground on the Cockle Sand, in the North Sea off the coast of Norfolk. She was on a voyage from South Shields, County Durham to London. She was refloated and taken in to Great Yarmouth, Norfolk in a leaky condition.
May Queen	United Kingdom	The ship ran aground in the Cattewater and was wrecked. She was on a voyage from Dordrecht, South Holland, Netherlands to Figueira da Foz, Portugal.
Prosperity	United Kingdom	The smack ran aground on the Black Rock, off the coast of Ayrshire.
Sabina	United Kingdom	The schooner was abandoned in the North Sea 40 nautical miles (74 km) north east of Cromer, Norfolk. Her crew were rescued by a Dutch fishing boat. She was subsequently towed in to Great Yarmouth by the smack Florence Mary (United Kingdom).
Superior	United Kingdom	The schooner sprang a leak and was beached 3 nautical miles (5.6 km) south of the Highland Lighthouse, Massachusetts, United States. She was on a voyage from Boston, Massachusetts to Martinique.
Telegraf	Netherlands	The steamship was wrecked in the Hellegat. She was on a voyage from Antwerp, Belgium to Rotterdam, South Holland.
Veritas	United Kingdom	The ship was wrecked near Mandal, Norway. She was on a voyage from Hull, Yorkshire to Fredrikstad, Norway.
Wild Wave	United States	The ship ran aground on the Alaranes Reefs. She was on a voyage from Santa Anna to Queensland. She was refloated and taken in to Havana, Cuba.

== 15 October ==
List of shipwrecks: 15 October 1872
Ship	State	Description
Charles	Belgium	The ship ran aground off Vlissingen, Zeeland, Netherlands. She was refloated and taken in tow for the Rammekens Castle.
Constantia	Norway	The ship was driven ashore on Vlieland, Friesland, Netherlands. Her crew were rescued. She was on a voyage from Christiania to Rotterdam, South Holland, Netherlands.
Humility	United Kingdom	The smack was driven ashore at Great Yarmouth, Norfolk. Her crew were rescued.
Isabel	(United Kingdom of Great Britain and Ireland) Jersey	The cutter ran aground on the Longsand, in the North Sea off the coast of Essex. She was on a voyage from Hartlepool, County Durham to Jersey. She was refloated but consequently foundered. Her crew were rescued by the smack Tryal (United Kingdom).
J. Gemelli	Italy	The ship was driven ashore and wrecked on Ameland, Friesland, Netherlands. All on board were rescued. She was on a voyage from Naples to Amsterdam, North Holland, Netherlands.
Newport	United Kingdom	The schooner was driven ashore at Bude, Cornwall.
Yeddo	United Kingdom	The steamship ran aground off "Lamijet Island", China. She was on a voyage from Shantou to Shanghai.

== 16 October ==
List of shipwrecks: 16 October 1872
Ship	State	Description
Artistic	United Kingdom	The ship was abandoned in the Atlantic Ocean. Her crew were rescued.
Charles	Belgium	The ship was destroyed by fire in the Scheldt.
Due Fratelli	Italy	The ship was driven ashore near "Roguelas". Her crew were rescued. She was on a voyage from Catania, Sicily to Dordrecht, South Holland, Netherlands.
Eiderstedt	Netherlands	The paddle steamer was driven ashore at Covehithe, Suffolk, United Kingdom. All on board were rescued. She was on a voyage from London, United Kingdom to Tønning.
Hero	United Kingdom	The ship was wrecked on the Goodwin Sands, Kent. Her four crew were rescued by the Walmer Lifeboat. She was on a voyage from Newcastle upon Tyne, Northumberland to Truro, Cornwall.
Jarlen	Norway	The ship was wrecked on an island off Sandhammaren. Her crew were rescued. She was on a voyage from Riga, Russia to Grangemouth, Stirlingshire.
King of Tyre	United Kingdom	The dandy rigged smack was driven ashore and sank at Lowestoft, Suffolk. Her crew were rescued.
Launceston, and Musgrave	United Kingdom	The steamships collided in the North Sea 8 nautical miles (15 km) off Hartlepool, County Durham. Both vessels sank. Musgrave was on a voyage from Port Mulgrave, Yorkshire to the River Tyne.
Lone Star	Canada	The ship was driven ashore at Dungeness, Kent. She was refloated and taken in to Dover, Kent in a leaky condition.
Progress	United States	The ship was driven ashore on Cherry Island. She was on a voyage from Philadelphia, Pennsylvania to Havre de Grâce, Seine-Inférieure, France.
Proteo	Austria-Hungary	The barque was wrecked on the Haisborough Sands, in the North Sea off the coast of Norfolk, United Kingdom with the loss of one of her twelve crew. She was on a voyage from Alexandria, Egypt to Hull, Yorkshire.
Redby	Sweden	The ship was driven ashore. She was on a voyage from Nyhamn to Berwick upon Tweed, Northumberland, United Kingdom. She was refloated and taken in to Ljusne.

== 17 October ==
List of shipwrecks: 17 October 1872
Ship	State	Description
Aculeo	United Kingdom	The ship was wrecked at Point Pedro, near San Francisco, California, United States. Her crew survived. She was on a voyage from Liverpool, Lancashire to San Francisco.
Congreve	United Kingdom	The ship foundered off the coast of the Natal Colony.

== 18 October ==
List of shipwrecks: 18 October 1872
Ship	State	Description
Corunna	United Kingdom	The ship was abandoned at sea. She was on a voyage from Troon, Ayrshire to Berbice, British Guiana.
Glide	Sweden	The brig ran aground near Understen. She was on a voyage from Skellefteå to Hull, Yorkshire, United Kingdom. She was refloated and taken in to Gävle in a severely leaky condition.
Guatemala	United States of Colombia	The steamship was wrecked at "Sanala Chiapas" with the loss of 28 lives.
Jean Bart	France	The brig was run down and sunk by the steamship Delston Castle (United Kingdom).
Jeune Marie	France	The lugger was run down and sunk in the North Sea by the barque Oqeundo (Spain). Her crew were rescued.
J. F. Chapman	United States	The ship was abandoned at sea. Her crew were rescued by Providenza (United States). J. F. Chapman was on a voyage from New York to Hamburg, Germany.
Marie Joseph	France	The ship was wrecked at Montpellier, Quebec, Canada. She was on a voyage from the Newfoundland Colony to Montpellier.
Sally	United Kingdom	The brig was wrecked on the Haisborough Sands, in the North Sea off the coast of Norfolk. Her crew were rescued. She was on a voyage from Seaham, County Durham to Portsmouth, Hampshire.
Sizarge	France	The ship sank at Corcubión, Spain.
St. Johannes	Germany	The full-rigged ship ran aground on the Cross Sand, in the North Sea off the coast of Norfolk. She was refloated with the assistance of the Caister Lifeboat and two tugs and was towed in to Great Yarmouth, Norfolk.
William Akins	United Kingdom	The ship was wrecked at Kylerhea, Isle of Skye. Her crew were rescued. She was on a voyage from Scrabster, Caithness to the Clyde.

== 19 October ==
List of shipwrecks: 19 October 1872
Ship	State	Description
Batavier	Netherlands	The paddle steamer collided with the mail steamer Charkieh ( (Ottoman Empire) Egyptian Navy) and sank in the River Thames at Barking, Essex, United Kingdom. All on board were rescued by Charkieh and the tug Constitution (United Kingdom), except one crewman and a baby that died. Batavier was on a voyage from London, United Kingdom to Rotterdam, South Holland. She was refloated on 20 November.
Concord	United Kingdom	The ship ran aground on the Cutler Sand, in the North Sea off the coast of Essex. She was on a voyage from Gävle, Sweden to London. She was refloated and found to be severely leaky, so was beached at Harwich, Essex.
Eugénie Marianne	France	The ship struck the Roche Cesar and sank. Her crew were rescued. She was on a voyage from Cardiff, Glamorgan, United Kingdom to L'Orient, Morbihan.
Unnamed	United Kingdom	A pilot boat capsized off Montrose, Forfarshire with the loss of five of the six people on board.

== 20 October ==
List of shipwrecks: 20 October 1872
Ship	State	Description
Active	United Kingdom	The ship was driven ashore on the east coast of Öland, Sweden. She was on a voyage from Gävle, Sweden to London.
Astrica	Germany	The schooner was driven ashore at Cape Arkona. She was on a voyage from Peterhead, Aberdeenshire, United Kingdom to Danzig. She was refloated the next day and taken in to Stralsund for repairs.
Chamois	United Kingdom	The barque sprang a leak and sank in the North Sea. Her crew were rescued by Charles Bal (Germany). Chamois was on a voyage from Newcastle upon Tyne, Northumberland to Christiania, Norway.
Emil Christensen	(Russian Empire) Grand Duchy of Finland	The ship capsized at Bridgwater, Somerset, United Kingdom. She was on a voyage from Oulu to Bridgwater.
Margaret Owen	United Kingdom	The schooner was driven ashore on Cape Arkona. She was on a voyage from Portmadoc, Caernarfonshire to Stettin, Germany.

== 21 October ==
List of shipwrecks: 21 October 1872
Ship	State	Description
Auguste Grossherzog von Mecklenburg	Germany	The ship was abandoned in the North Sea. Her crew got aboard the Owers Lightship ( Trinity House), from where they were rescued by a smack. Auguste Grossherzog von Mecklenberg was on a voyage from Wismar to Dunkirk, Nord, France. She was towed in to Blakeney, Norfolk, United Kingdom in a derelict condition.
Caroline Marie	Sweden	The barque was run down and sunk in the North Sea 40 nautical miles (74 km) off the mouth of the River Tyne by the steamship Mary (United Kingdom) with the loss of eight of her eleven crew. Survivors were rescued by the schooner Lady Queen (United Kingdom).
Cuban	United Kingdom	The steamship sank at Barbados. All on board were rescued. Cuban was on a voyage from Liverpool, Lancashire to Barbados. She was later refloated. Subsequently repaired and returned to service.
Elinor Chapman	United Kingdom	The ship ran aground at Portland, Dorset. She was on a voyage from South Shields, County Durham to Genoa, Italy. She was refloated.
Energy	United Kingdom	The ship was driven ashore on Hunting Island, South Carolina, United States. Her crew were rescued. She was on a voyage from Cardiff, Glamorgan to Port Royal, Jamaica. She was declared a total loss.
Ernest	Sweden	The ship ran aground on the Leman and Ower Sand, in the North Sea. She was on a voyage from Hudiksvall to Bristol, Gloucestershire, United Kingdom. She was refloated and towed in to Grimsby, Lincolnshire, United Kingdom in a waterlogged condition.

== 22 October ==
List of shipwrecks: 22 October 1872
Ship	State	Description
Asteriana	United Kingdom	The ship departed from Rangoon, Burma for Liverpool, Lancashire. Presumed subsequently foundered with the loss of all hands; a boat and wreckage were discovered off the Andaman Islands.
Cresswell	United Kingdom	The steamship departed from Falmouth, Cornwall for Cork. No further trace, presumed foundered with the loss of all hands.
Dania	United Kingdom	The steamship was driven ashore in Riga Bay. She was on a voyage from Middlesbrough, Yorkshire to Riga, Russia. Dania was refloated the on 24 October and taken in to Riga.
Missouri	United States	The steamship burned and sank in the Bahamas. She was on a voyage from New York to Nassau, Bahamas. Two of the people who died on the voyage were, Richard Cecil Cleveland and Lewis Frederick Cleveland, the brothers of future US President Grover Cleveland. There were twelve survivors.
Patrician	United Kingdom	The schooner was driven ashore at Punta Mala, Spain. She was on a voyage from Chile to Hamburg, Germany. She was refloated on 30 October.
HMS Serapis	Royal Navy	The Euphrates-class troopship ran aground in the Great Bitter Lake, Suez Canal. She was refloated on 24 October.

== 23 October ==
List of shipwrecks: 23 October 1872
Ship	State	Description
Atalanta	Norway	The barque was driven ashore at Dungeness, Kent, United Kingdom. She was on a voyage from Härnösand, Sweden to a French port. She was refloated and taken in to Gravesend, Kent.
Estonia	Sweden	The ship was driven ashore and wrecked on the west coast of Gotland. She was on a voyage from London, United Kingdom to Nyhamn.
Marie	Germany	The brigantine was wrecked near Cape Picolet, Haiti.
Mona's Pride	(United Kingdom of Great Britain and Ireland) Isle of Man	The ship departed from Viana do Castelo, Portugal for São Miguel Island, Azores. No further trace, presumed foundered with the loss of all hands.
Pelaw	United Kingdom	The ship ran aground at Spittal Point, Northumberland. She was on a voyage from Granton, Lothian to South Shields, County Durham. She was refloated and beached at Berwick upon Tweed, Northumberland.
Union Bayonnaise	France	The steamship was driven ashore at Dungeness. She was refloated and resumed her voyage.
William Walworth	United States	The schooner was lost on Squam Bar. crew saved.

== 24 October ==
List of shipwrecks: 24 October 1872
Ship	State	Description
Emmy	United Kingdom	The steamship was driven ashore at Agger, Denmark. She was on a voyage from Newcastle upon Tyne, Northumberland to Kronstadt, Russia.
John	New South Wales	The ship was wrecked on McCraig's Shoals, off the coast of Delaware, United States. She was on a voyage from Sydney to Philadelphia, Pennsylvania, United States.
John Watt	United States	The ship was lost off Cape Henlopen, Delaware. She was on a voyage from New York to Savannah, Georgia and Havana, Cuba.
Lilly	United Kingdom	The ship was wrecked on the Haisborough Sands, in the North Sea off the coast of Norfolk. Her crew were rescued. She was on a voyage from Kronstadt, Russia to Great Yarmouth, Norfolk.
Queen of the Usk	United Kingdom	The ship was driven ashore near Bootle, Cumberland. She was on a voyage from Cork to Barrow-in-Furness, Lancashire. She was refloated on 29 October.
Robert Stephenson	United Kingdom	The brig ran aground on the Maplin Sand, in the North Sea off the coast of Essex. She was on a voyage from London to North Shields, Northumberland. She was refloated.
Thomas Baker	United Kingdom	The brig was abandoned in the North Sea. Her crew were rescued. She was on a voyage from South Shields, County Durham to the Nieuwe Diep. She was subsequently towed in to Great Yarmouth, Norfolk by some smacks.
Urgent	United Kingdom	The Thames barge was abandoned off the coast of Sussex. Her crew were rescued by the Camber Lifeboat. She was on a voyage from Rochester, Kent to Rye, Sussex. She subsequently sank.
Vincenzo Gianello	Italy	The barque ran aground on the Haisborough Sands. She was on a voyage from Sunderland, County Durham, United Kingdom to Genoa. She was refloated and taken in to Great Yarmouth in a leaky condition.
Virginia	United Kingdom	The ship was driven ashore at Broadsands, Devon. She was refloated on 31 October.

== 25 October ==
List of shipwrecks: 25 October 1872
Ship	State	Description
Anglo-Norman	(United Kingdom of Great Britain and Ireland) Guernsey	The brig was abandoned in the Atlantic Ocean. Her crew were rescued. She was on a voyage from Curaçao, Curaçao and Dependencies to Plymouth, Devon.
Eiginna	Norway	The barque was wrecked on the Haisborough Sands, in the North Sea off the coast of Norfolk, United Kingdom. Her crew were rescued. She was on a voyage from Kronstadt, Russia to London, United Kingdom.
Jeune Noemie	France	The ship ran aground on the Banjaard Sand, in the North Sea off the Dutch coast. Her crew were rescued by a lifeboat. She was on a voyage from "Roche Bernard" to Rotterdam, South Holland, Netherlands.
Lily	United Kingdom	The barque was wrecked on the Haisborough Sands. Her crew were rescued. She was on a voyage from Kronstadt to Great Yarmouth, Norfolk.
Mystic	United Kingdom	The ship departed from Pensacola, Florida, United States for Sharpness, Gloucestershire. No further trace, presumed foundered with the loss of all hands.
Richard Thompson	United Kingdom	The brigantine ran aground at Dungarvan, County Waterford.
Vondel	Netherlands	The schooner was lost off Shandong, China. Her crew were rescued but the wreck was plundered by the local inhabitants.

== 26 October ==
List of shipwrecks: 26 October 1872
Ship	State	Description
Alexander Gibson	United Kingdom	The ship was abandoned in the Kattegat. Her crew were rescued. She was on a voyage from Liverpool, Lancashire to Danzig, Germany.
Bengalese	United Kingdom	The steamship was driven ashore in Gibraltar Bay. She was on a voyage from the Black Sea to an English port. She was refloated with assistance from the tug Hercules ( (United Kingdom of Great Britain and Ireland) Gibraltar.
Corinthian	United Kingdom	The ship was driven ashore in Loreguil Bay. She was on a voyage from Montreal, Quebec, Canada to Glasgow, Renfrewshire.
Marton	United Kingdom	The steamship ran aground on the North Bull, in the Irish Sea off the coast of County Dublin. She was on a voyage from Dublin to Newport, Monmouthshire. She was refloated and resumed her voyage.
Northumberland	United Kingdom	The ship ran aground in the River Tees. She was on a voyage from Quebec City to West Hartlepool, County Durham. She was refloated and taken in to West Hartlepool in a leaky condition.
Silvia	United Kingdom	The ship was destroyed by fire at sea. Her crew were rescued. She was on a voyage from Swansea, Glamorgan to Santos, Brazil.
Ticonderoga	India	The ship was wrecked in the Hooghly River. She was on a voyage from Calcutta to Jeddah, Hejaz Vilayet.

== 27 October ==
List of shipwrecks: 27 October 1872
Ship	State	Description
James Maychurch	United Kingdom	The steamship departed from "Vedien", Cape Breton Island, Nova Scotia, Canada for Cardiff, Glamorgan. No further trace, presumed foundered with the loss of all hands.
Johanna	Flag unknown	The ship was driven ashore on the east coast of Öland, Sweden. She was on a voyage from "Mein" to Hartlepool, County Durham, United Kingdom.
Nina	United Kingdom	The brig, from London for Buenos Aires, Argentina, foundered 20 nautical miles (37 km) south-east of Itapemirim, Espírito Santo, Brazil; the crew was landed at Rio de Janeiro.

== 28 October ==
List of shipwrecks: 28 October 1872
Ship	State	Description
Amedée	France	The ship was wrecked at the mouth of the Aude.
Blijhan	Netherlands	The schooner capsized in the North Sea and was abandoned. Her crew were rescued by the fishing sloop Eclipse (United Kingdom). Blijhan was on a voyage from Memel, Germany to Rotterdam, South Holland.
Bruno	Canada	The steamship struck a rock in the Galoup Rapids, in the Saint Lawrence River and sank.
Drace	Germany	The barque was abandoned in the Atlantic Ocean with the loss of ten of her twelve crew. She was on a voyage from Santa Anna to Falmouth, Cornwall, United Kingdom.
Good Hope	United Kingdom	The steamship was driven ashore at Chester, Pennsylvania, United States. She was on a voyage from Philadelphia, Pennsylvania to Liverpool, Lancashire.
John Clue	United Kingdom	The brig struck a rock and sank in the Gulf of Finland off Hanko, Grand Duchy of Finland. Her crew were rescued. She was on a voyage from Kronstadt, Russia to an English port.
John Mann	United States	The ship ran aground in the Savannah River. She was on a voyage from Boston, Massachusetts to Savannah, Georgia.
Kent	United Kingdom	The steamship was driven ashore on Hiiumaa, Russia. She was on a voyage from Hull, Yorkshire to Reval, Russia.
Maggie L. Carvill	United States	The ship was driven ashore in Cresswell Bay. She was on a voyage from Antwerp, Belgium to Sunderland, County Durham, United Kingdom. She was refloated on 30 October and taken in to Sunderland.
Suwa	Germany	The ship was driven ashore at Cape St. James, near Saigon, French Indo-China.
Tacora	United Kingdom	The steamship ran aground and was wrecked at Cape St. Marie, Uruguay with the loss of two lives. About 700 people were rescued, 300 of them by HMS Pert (Royal Navy). Tacora was on her maiden voyage, to Valparaíso, Chile.
Zebre	France	The sloop sprang a leak and was abandoned in the English Channel off Dymchurch, Kent, United Kingdom. Her four crew were rescued by the Dymchurch Lifeboat. She subsequently came ashore at Dymchurch and was wrecked.
1848	United Kingdom	The brig was driven ashore in the River Ouse.

== 29 October ==
List of shipwrecks: 29 October 1872
Ship	State	Description
Bifondo, and Ocean Ranger	Norway; United Kingdom	The barque ran aground on the Goodwin Sands, Kent, United Kingdom. She was on a voyage from a Baltic port to Belfast, County Antrim, United Kingdom. She was refloated the next day and drifted out to sea. She was discovered 6 nautical miles (11 km) off the North Foreland by the smacks Blue Bell, Ocean Ranger and Volunteer (all United Kingdom), which attempted to take her in tow. Bifondo and Ocean Ranger collided and the smack sank. Her crew were rescued by Blue Bell. Bifondo caught fire.
Douglas	United Kingdom	The ship ran aground in the Suez Canal.
Esther	United Kingdom	The pilot cutter collided with Trot (United Kingdom) and sank in the Bristol Channel off Ross Point, Monmouthshire. Her crew were rescued.
Glenarn	United Kingdom	The ship departed from Redonda to Garston, Lancashire. No further trace, presumed foundered with the loss of all hands.
Holmside	United Kingdom	The steamship collided with another vessel in the River Thames and was severely damabed. She was then run into by a steamship and sank downstream of Gravesend, Kent. Her crew survived. She was on a voyage from London to South Shields, County Durham. She was refloated on 1 November and resumed her voyage.
Liverpool	United Kingdom	The barque was wrecked in the Saint Lawrence River near Bic, Nova Scotia, Canada. Her crew survived. She was on a voyage from Quebec City, Canada to Troon, Ayrshire.
Louisa	United Kingdom	The ship was wrecked in the Sound of Mull. Her crew were rescued. She was on a voyage from Caernarfon to Aberdeen.
Marie Celeste	France	The schooner was driven ashore at Merlimont, Pas-de-Calais.
Pearl	United Kingdom	The schooner was driven ashore and wrecked at Fort Carlisle, Queenstown, County Cork.
Princess Victoria	United Kingdom	The schooner was wrecked on the North Rock, in the Belfast Lough.
Rosina	Italy	The barque collided with a German ship and sank off Maldonado, Uruguay. She was on a voyage from Genoa to Buenos Aires, Argentina.

== 30 October ==
List of shipwrecks: 30 October 1872
Ship	State	Description
Ann	United Kingdom	The ship was abandoned in the North Sea off Great Yarmouth, Norfolk. Her crew were rescued by Young Rose (United Kingdom) and another vessel. Ann was on a voyage from Sunderland, County Durham to Rotterdam, South Holland, Netherlands.
Dauntless	United Kingdom	The brigantine ran aground on the Chapman Flats, in the North Sea off the coast of Essex. She was on a voyage from South Shields, County Durham to Woolwich, Kent.
De Novo	United Kingdom	The ship departed from Kronstadt, Russia for London. No further trace, presumed foundered with the loss of all hands.
Glendevon	United Kingdom	The schooner ran aground and sank off Tanager, Denmark with the loss of all but one of her crew.
Jane Sawyer	United Kingdom	The schooner was driven ashore at Ambleteuse, Pas-de-Calais, France. Her crew were rescued. She was on a voyage from Guernsey, Channel Islands to London.
Sabra Moses	United States	The ship was wrecked on the Middelplaat, in the North Sea off the coast of Zeeland, Netherlands. She was on a voyage from Philadelphia, Pennsylvania to Rotterdam. She was refloated on 1 November and towed in to Brouwershaven, Zeeland in a severely leaky condition.
Sofie	Norway	The schooner was wrecked at Stavanger Her crew were rescued. She was on a voyage from Alloa, Clackmannanshire, United Kingdom to Gothenburg, Sweden.
Stella	United States	The ship was driven ashore at Cape Lookout, North Carolina. She was on a voyage from Providence, Rhode Island to Charleston, South Carolina.
Thorbeke	United Kingdom	The ship departed from Kronstadt for Helsingør, Denmark. No further trace, presumed foundered in the Baltic Sea with the loss of all hands.
Viking	Canada	The brig ran aground on Coles Reef. She was on a voyage from Prince Edward Island to Pictou, Nova Scotia. She was refloated the next day.

== 31 October ==
List of shipwrecks: 31 October 1872
Ship	State	Description
Corunna	United Kingdom	The ship was abandoned in the North Sea. Her crew were rescued.
Elizabeth	United Kingdom	The ship was sighted off Helsingør, Denmark whilst on a voyage from Härnösand, Sweden to the River Tyne. No further trace, presumed foundered with the loss of all hands.
Lebanon	United Kingdom	The brig ran aground on the Goodwin Sands, Kent. She was on a voyage from Arroyo, Puerto Rico to Antwerp, Belgium. She was refloated and taken in to Great Yarmouth, Norfolk in a leaky condition.
Lochiel	United Kingdom	The ship departed from Montreal, Quebec, Canada for Liverpool, Lancashire. No further trace, presumed foundered with the loss of all hands.
Martin Luther	United Kingdom	The fishing coble collided with a French lugger and sank at Great Yarmouth, Norfolk. Her crew were rescued.
Oregon	United Kingdom	The ship was driven ashore south of Larne, County Antrim. She was on a voyage from Ayr to Belfast, County Antrim.
Rapid	United Kingdom	The ship was wrecked at Boulogne, Pas-de-Calais, France. Her crew were rescued. She was on a voyage from St. Ubes, Portugal to Gothenburg, Sweden.
Velocity	United Kingdom	The steamship struck the pier at Calais, France and sank. She was on a voyage from London to Calais.
Victor	United Kingdom	The steamship was wrecked in the Jupiter Inlet. She was on a voyage from New York to New Orleans, Louisiana.
Watchman	Canada	The brigantine was destroyed by fire in the Atlantic Ocean. She was on a voyage from New York to an English port.
Wave	United Kingdom	The ship ran aground off Helsingborg, Sweden and was damaged. She was on a voyage from Peterhead, Aberdeenshire to Stettin, Germany. She was refloated and taken in to Helsingør.

== Unknown date ==
List of shipwrecks: Unknown date in October 1872
Ship	State	Description
Ada	United Kingdom	The ship was wrecked on Anticosti Island, Nova Scotia, Canada. Her crew survived; some of them were rescued by the barque Hindostan (United Kingdom). Ada was on a voyage from Montreal, Quebec, Canada to Hull, Yorkshire.
Aquarius	Netherlands	The brig was driven ashore at Whydah, Dahomey before 29 October. Her crew were rescued. She was on a voyage from Antwerp, Belgium to an African port.
Argo	United Kingdom	The ship was abandoned at sea before 25 October with the loss of three of her crew. Survivors were rescued by Loch Tay (United Kingdom).
Bernardine de St. Pierre	France	The ship was wrecked on Sal, Cape Verde Islands before 30 October.
Cadenace	United Kingdom	The steamship was destroyed by fire at sea before 23 October. Her crew were rescued. She was on a voyage from Liverpool, Lancashire to Callao, Peru.
China	Canada	The steamship was destroyed by fire in Lake Ontario 15 nautical miles (28 km) off Kingston, Ontario.
City of Perth	United Kingdom	The brigantine was abandoned off Bardsey Island, Pembrokeshire before 12 October.
Cyclops	United Kingdom	The barque collided with the steamship Thames and sank at Quebec City, Canada.
HMS Daphne	Royal Navy	The Amazon-class sloop ran aground. She was taken in to Bombay, India for repairs.
Delta	Canada	The ship was driven ashore and severely damaged at Bermuda. She was on a voyage from Halifax, Nova Scotia to Saint Thomas, Virgin Islands. She was refloated and taken in to Saint Georges, Bermuda.
Eagle	United Kingdom	The steamship ran aground at Trois-Rivières, Quebec.
Elizabeth	Germany	The jacht was wrecked on the Galvanasen Bank with the loss of a crew member.
Elizabeth	New South Wales	The schooner was wrecked in the Royal Islands.
Eywind	Norway	The ship was wrecked at Thisted, Denmark. She was on a voyage from Kronstadt, Russia to London, United Kingdom.
Golden Hind	United States	The ship was wrecked on Charles Island, Ecuador with the ultimate loss of twelve of her crew.
Isobel	United Kingdom	The sloop ran aground on the Longsand, in the North Sea off the coast of Essex, and sank. Her crew were rescued.
James Welsh	British Honduras	The barque was lost before 3 October. Her crew survived. She was on a voyage from New York, United States to Barbados.
Jenny Bertaux	United Kingdom	The barque was wrecked at Saint Thomas before 8 October.
Lac la Belle	United States	The steamship foundered in Lake Michigan before 15 October with the loss of five lives.
Lebanon	United Kingdom	The ship was wrecked on Anticosti Island. Her crew survived; some of them were rescued by the barque Hindostan (United Kingdom). Lebanon was on a voyage from Trois-Rivières to the Clyde.
Liepa Bakarka	Austria-Hungary	The barque was driven ashore at Cape May, New Jersey, United States. She was on a voyage from Rio de Janeiro, Brazil to New York.
Margaret Dees	United Kingdom	The fishing smack was run down and sunk in the North Sea by the steamship E. M. Palmer (United Kingdom).
Maria	United Kingdom	The schooner foundered in the Bristol Channel in late October with the loss of all four crew.
Mary	United States	The brig was abandoned in the Atlantic Ocean before 11 October. Her crew were rescued. She was on a voyage from Freeport to Barbados.
Medway	United Kingdom	The barque was wrecked off Cape Henlopen, Delaware, United States with some loss of life. She was on a voyage from London to Philadelphia, Pennsylvania, United States.
Niagara	France	The ship was driven ashore on the east coast of Africa before 10 October.
Peace	United Kingdom	The ship was driven ashore and wrecked near South Shields, County Durham. She was on a voyage from London to West Hartlepool, County Durham.
Peter	United Kingdom	The smack was abandoned in Llandudno Bay. Her four crew were rescued by the Great Orme Head Lifeboat.
USS Polaris	United States Navy	The steamship was caught in ice sometime in October in the North Pacific Ocean. She was later crushed by the ice. Ten of her crew were rescued from an ice flow in May 1873 by the sealing steamship Tigress (United States).
Premier	United Kingdom	The ship was wrecked on the coast of the Newfoundland Colony. She was on a voyage from Quebec City to Holyhead, Anglesey.
Prowess	Canada	The ship was abandoned at sea. Her crew were rescued by Hartfell (United Kingdom). Prowess was on a voyage from Fernandina Island, Galapagos Islands to Montevideo, Uruguay.
Samarang	United Kingdom	The ship was driven ashore in Longueil Bay. She was on a voyage from Montreal to Cork. She was refloated on 1 November.
Saxon	Norway	The ship was wrecked on the Morant Cays. She was on a voyage from Liverpool to Belize City, British Honduras.
St. Michael	United Kingdom	The ship was run ashore and sank at "Kuja", 10 nautical miles (19 km) from Arkhangelsk, Russia.
Zouave	United Kingdom.	The yacht was run aground at Southsea, Hampshire. She was refloated with the assistance of a tug.
