= List of shipwrecks in July 1866 =

The list of shipwrecks in July 1866 includes ships sunk, foundered, grounded, or otherwise lost during July 1866.

== 1 July ==
List of shipwrecks: 1 July 1866
Ship	State	Description
Clara Mathilda	Sweden	The brig was driven ashore near "Nahr". She was on a voyage from Sundsvall to Grangemouth, Stirlingshire, United Kingdom. She was refloated and taken in to "Slite" for repairs.
Norman	United Kingdom	The brigantine was driven ashore on the coast of Eure, France and capsized. She was on a voyage from Newcastle upon Tyne, Northumberland to Havre de Grâce, Seine-Inférieure, France.
Star	(United Kingdom of Great Britain and Ireland) Jersey	The ship was wrecked off the coast of Brazil. She was on a voyage from Newcastle upon Tyne, Northumberland to Pará, Brazil.

== 2 July ==
List of shipwrecks: 2 July 1866
Ship	State	Description
Lady Seymour	United Kingdom	The ship was wrecked on the Pencil Rocks, in the Saint Lawrence River. Her crew survived. She was on a voyage from Quebec City, Province of Canada, British North America to Bristol, Gloucestershire.
Thomas Brown	United Kingdom	The schooner ran aground at Sunderland, County Durham. She was refloated and taken in to Sunderland.

== 3 July ==
List of shipwrecks: 3 July 1866
Ship	State	Description
Adelaide	(United Kingdom of Great Britain and Ireland) South Australia	The ship was wrecked at the entrance to the Olinda Channel with some loss of life. She was on a voyage from Sydney, New South Wales to Mauritius.
Clio	United Kingdom	The ship was abandoned in the Atlantic Ocean. Her crew were rescued by Ocean Bride (United Kingdom). Clio was on a voyage from Cardiff, Glamorgan to Newfoundland, British North America.

== 4 July ==
List of shipwrecks: 4 July 1866
Ship	State	Description
Calypso	(United Kingdom of Great Britain and Ireland) New South Wales	The brig was en route from Newcastle, New South Wales to Dunedin, New Zealand with a cargo of coal. She struck a gale in Foveaux Strait and was damaged, and changed course for Stewart Island to repair the damage. Here she struck an uncharted reef and was holed. Her captain changed course again, to try to make harbour, but she hit bottom close to the island's southern shore, becoming a wreck.
Marinus	United Kingdom	The ship was driven ashore at Berry Head, Devon. She was on a voyage rom South Shields, County Durham to Genoa, Italy.
Union	United Kingdom	The ship was driven ashore at Barcelona, Spain. She was on a voyage from London to Cette, Hérault.

== 6 July ==
List of shipwrecks: 6 July 1866
Ship	State	Description
Chaucer	United Kingdom	The steamship was wrecked on the Cabezos, off Málaga, Spain. She was on a voyage from Málaga to London.
Conqueror	United Kingdom	The ship ran aground and sank off Bet Island, Queensland. Her crew survived. She was on a voyage from Newcastle, New South Wales to Bombay, India.
Ephesus	United Kingdom	The steamship was wrecked on Cape Sable Island, Nova Scotia, British North America. She was on a voyage from Norfolk, Virginia, United States to Liverpool, Lancashire.
Vencedor de Africa	Spain	The steamship ran aground on the Cochinos Reef, off the coast of Spain.

== 7 July ==
List of shipwrecks: 7 July 1866
Ship	State	Description
Ann and Margaret	United Kingdom	The schooner collided with the barque Auguste (Prussia) and sank in the English Channel off Dungeness, Kent. Her crew were rescued. She was on a voyage from South Shields, County Durham to Gibraltar.
Henry Woollez	United Kingdom	The ship capsized and sank at Quebec City, Province of Canada, British North America.
Thorndean	United Kingdom	The ship was driven ashore on Red Island, Newfoundland, British North America. She was on a voyage from Liverpool, Lancashire to Quebec City. She was refloated.

== 8 July ==
List of shipwrecks: 8 July 1866
Ship	State	Description
Archibald McMillan	United Kingdom	The ship was wrecked of a reef off Punta Mulas, Cuba. She was on a voyage from Greenock, Renfrewshire to St. Jago de Cuba, Cuba.

== 9 July ==
List of shipwrecks: 9 July 1866
Ship	State	Description
HMS Amazon, and Osprey	Royal Navy; United Kingdom	The Amazon-class sloop HMS Amazon collided with the steamship Osprey in the English Channel 18 nautical miles (33 km) south west of Portland, Dorset. Osprey was on a voyage from Cork to Antwerp, Belgium. She sank with the loss of twelve of the 32 people on board. Survivors were rescued by HMS Amazon, which later sank with the loss of sixteen lives. Survivors took to the boats, and reached Torquay, Devon the next day with assistance from the smacks Jane and Water Lily and two other boats (all United Kingdom). HMS Amazon was on a voyage from Spithead, Hampshire to Halifax, Nova Scotia, British North America.
Anna Lange	Bremen	The full-rigged ship caught fire at Cardiff, Glamorgan, United Kingdom and was scuttled. She was severely damaged.

== 10 July ==
List of shipwrecks: 10 July 1866
Ship	State	Description
Rose, or Ross	United Kingdom	The ship ran aground on the Mears Rocks, off Coverack, Cornwall. All on board were rescued. She was on a voyage from London to Limerick.

== 11 July ==
List of shipwrecks: 11 July 1866
Ship	State	Description
Ada	United Kingdom	The ship was driven ashore at Boca Chica, Dominican Republic.
Albina	United Kingdom	The ship was driven ashore at Boca Chica. She was on a voyage from Liverpool, Lancashire to Matamoros, Mexico.
Betsey	United Kingdom	The ship ran aground on the Fahludd Reef, in the Baltic Sea and was wrecked. She was on a voyage from Ventava, Courland Governorate to London
Corio	(United Kingdom of Great Britain and Ireland) New South Wales	The collier foundered with the loss of all nine crew. She was on a voyage from Bulli to Sydney.
Providence	France	The schooner ran aground off the Pointe des Renarde and sank. Her crew survived. She was on a voyage from Cardiff, Glamorgan, United Kingdom to Nantes, Loire-Inférieure. Providence was refloated the next day and towed in to Brest, Finistère.
Royal William	United Kingdom	The dredge boat, a smack, was run down and sunk at Harwich, Essex by the paddle steamer Avalon (United Kingdom). Her three crew were rescued.
Saltram	United Kingdom	The schooner collided with the tug Cruizer and sank off South Stack, Anglesey. Her crew were rescued. She was on a voyage from Liverpool, Lancashire to Falmouth, Cornwall.
Victoire	France	The full-rigged ship ran aground on the Goodwin Sands, Kent, United Kingdom. She was on a voyage from South Shields, County Durham, United Kingdom to Cherbourg, Seine-Inférieure. She was refloated and taken in to Ramsgate, Kent for repairs.

== 12 July ==
List of shipwrecks: 12 July 1866
Ship	State	Description
Arthur	(United Kingdom of Great Britain and Ireland)	The ketch was wrecked at Nobbys Head with the loss of all on board.
Carnation	(United Kingdom of Great Britain and Ireland) New South Wales	The schooner was beached in Seal Rock Bay where she was wrecked. All on board survived. .
Cawarra	(United Kingdom of Great Britain and Ireland) New South Wales	The paddle steamer was overwhelmed by large waves and sank bow first in the harbour at Newcastle, with the loss of 60 lives. Only one passenger survived. She was on a voyage from Sydney to Rockhampton, Queensland.
Chapman	United Kingdom	The full-rigged ship was wrecked near Alibag, india. Her crew were rescued.
Friends	(United Kingdom of Great Britain and Ireland) New South Wales	The steamship was wrecked at Tuggerah.
Lismore	(United Kingdom of Great Britain and Ireland) British North America	The schooner was driven ashore and wrecked at Newcastle. Her crew were rescued. She was on a voyage from Newcastle to Sydney.
Marie Rosalie	France	The lugger sprang a leak and sank in the Baltic Sea south of Hanö, Sweden. Her crew were rescued. She was on a voyage from Helgenæs, Denmark to Le Tréport, Seine-Inférieure.
Seagull	(United Kingdom of Great Britain and Ireland) New South Wales	The schooner foundered off Newcastle with the loss of all hands. She was on a voyage from the Richmond River to Newcastle.
Vicary	India	The barque was wrecked near Alibag. Her crew were rescued.

== 13 July ==
List of shipwrecks: 13 July 1866
Ship	State	Description
Esk	(United Kingdom of Great Britain and Ireland)	The barque was wrecked at Newcastle. She was on a voyage from Wellington, New Zealand, to Newcastle.
Hos	United Kingdom	The barque was wrecked in a dry dock in Liverpool, Lancashire when supports gave way.
Lady Bowen	United Kingdom	The ship was driven ashore at Sydney.
Mary and Rose	(United Kingdom of Great Britain and Ireland) Tasmania	The schooner was wrecked at "Narrowgut" with the loss of five of the eight people on board. She was on a voyage from Circular Head to Brisbane, Queensland.
Rambler	(United Kingdom of Great Britain and Ireland) New Zealand	The schooner foundered off the New Zealand North Island east coast with the loss of three lives. The ship was last spotted from the Cutter Greenwich on 12 July, which was running from an approaching gale and heavy sea.
Rhoderick Dhu	(United Kingdom of Great Britain and Ireland) New South Wales	The schooner was wrecked at Norma Point, 14 nautical miles (26 km) south of Port Stephens. Her crew were rescued.
West Hartley No.2	(United Kingdom of Great Britain and Ireland) New South Wales	The ship was wrecked in Lake Macquarie. Her crew survived.
William Watson	(United Kingdom of Great Britain and Ireland) New South Wales	The barque capsized off Nobbys Head. She was righted but was driven ashore and wrecked at Newcastle with the loss of two of her crew.

== 14 July ==
List of shipwrecks: 14 July 1866
Ship	State	Description
Colonist	United Kingdom	The ship ran aground on the Glasgarnian Bank, in the Irish Sea off the coast of County Dublin. She was on a voyage from Quebec City, Province of Canada, British North America to Kingstown, County Dublin and Newry, County Antrim.
Margaret	United Kingdom	The barque was driven ashore at Dunnet Head, Caithness. She was refloated with assistance from Vanguard (United Kingdom) and towed in to Scrabster, Caithness in a waterlogged condition.
Netherby	United Kingdom	The full-rigged ship ran aground and sank off King Island, Tasmania. All 462 people on board survived both the sinking and being marooned on the island. She was on a voyage from Plymouth, Devon to Queensland.

== 15 July ==
List of shipwrecks: 15 July 1866
Ship	State	Description
A. L. Peck	United Kingdom	The brig was wrecked in the Turks Islands. She was on a voyage from New York to Santa Cruz.
Annie Laurie	(United Kingdom of Great Britain and Ireland) New Zealand	The cutter foundered five miles from the Aldermen Islands in New Zealand's Bay of Plenty.
Billow	United Kingdom	The brigantine was abandoned off The Skerries, Anglesey. She was on a voyage from Newport, Monmouthshire to Liverpool, Lancashire.
Bury St. Edmunds	United Kingdom	The ship ran aground on the Owers Sandbank, in the English Channel off the coast of Suffolk. She was refloated and put in to Southampton, Hampshire.
Deux Frères	France	The lugger struck the Vinotiere Rocks, in the Conquet Channel and foundered. Her crew were rescued. She was on a voyage from "Imperatrice" to Le Tréport, Seine-Inférieure.
Euras	United Kingdom	The ship was beached at St. Ubes, Portugal on fire and was abandoned by her crew. She was on a voyage from Cartagena, Spain to South Shields, County Durham.
Mimmie Dyke	(United Kingdom of Great Britain and Ireland) Victoria	The schooner was wrecked in the Kent Group, Tasmania. Her crew were rescued.
Rajah	United Kingdom	The steamship ran into the Arsenal Pier, Woolwich, Kent and sank in the River Thames downstream of the Town Pier, Woolwich.

== 16 July ==
List of shipwrecks: 16 July 1866
Ship	State	Description
Chapman	United Kingdom	The ship was wrecked 7 nautical miles (13 km) south of Bombay, India.
Pawnee	United States	The barque ran aground on the Blackwater Bank, in the Irish Sea off the coast of County Wexford, United Kingdom and was abandoned by her crew. She was on a voyage from Liverpool, Lancashire, United Kingdom to Montevideo, Uruguay. She subsequently floated off and was boarded by the Coastguard. Pawnee was taken in to for Waterford, United Kingdom.
Robert	Prussia	The schooner foundered 20 nautical miles (37 km) south west of the Old Head of Kinsale, County Cork, United Kingdom. Her crew survived. She was on a voyage from Ardrossan, Ayrshire, United Kingdom to Seville, Spain.
Sarah	United States	The fishing schooner sprung a leak and sank on the Georges Bank. Crew saved.
Vivid	(United Kingdom of Great Britain and Ireland) New Zealand	The schooner encountered bad weather while en route from Wairoa to Napier and began to leak. She filled fast and was abandoned by her captain and two passengers off Māhia Peninsula. The wreckage of the boat came ashore two days later.

== 17 July ==
List of shipwrecks: 17 July 1866
Ship	State	Description
British Queen	United Kingdom	The barque was abandoned in the Atlantic Ocean. Her crew were rescued by Bavarian (United States). British Queen was on a voyage from Quebec City, Province of Canada, British North America to Tynemouth, Northumberland.
Marie Adele	France	The lugger struck rocks off "Perri". She was on a voyage from Nantes, Loire-Inférieure to Sunderland, County Durham, United Kingdom. She was towed in to "Painghouf" in a waterlogged condition and beached.
Wild Wave	(United Kingdom of Great Britain and Ireland) New Zealand	The schooner foundered on an uncharted reef near Cuba Channel, northwest of Chatham Island. The ship became a total wreck but all hands were saved.

== 18 July ==
List of shipwrecks: 18 July 1866
Ship	State	Description
Aurora	United Kingdom	The barque was abandoned in the Atlantic Ocean 800 nautical miles (1,500 km) west of the Isles of Scilly. Her crew were rescued by Bessie Rowe (United Kingdom). Aurora was on a voyage from Quebec City, Province of Canada, British North America to Sunderland, County Durham.

== 19 July ==
List of shipwrecks: 19 July 1866
Ship	State	Description
Cathay	United Kingdom	The barque was wrecked on a reef in the Pacific Ocean. Her crew survived. She was on a voyage from Sydney, New South Wales to Batavia, Netherlands East Indies.

== 20 July ==
List of shipwrecks: 20 July 1866
Ship	State	Description
Atlas	United Kingdom	The schooner was wrecked on a reef on a reef in the Indian Ocean. Her crew were rescued. She was on a voyage from Table Bay to Mauritius.
Deese	Flag unknown	The schooner was wrecked on Cape Farewell, New Zealand. The crew abandoned ship and were marooned on the spit until rescued by the steamer Tararua.
Nordstjern	Kingdom of Hanover	The galiot was driven ashore near Helsingborg, Sweden. She was on a voyage from Saint Petersburg, Russia to Leith, Lothian, United Kingdom. She was refloated.
Palestro	Regia Marina	Third Italian War of Independence, Battle of Lissa: The coastal defense ship exploded and sank in the Adriatic Sea off Lissa with the loss of 211 of her 230-man crew after the ironclad warship SMS Erzherzog Ferdinand Max ( Austrian Navy) rammed her, dismasting her and setting her afire.
Picayune	Italy	The ship was lost near Mount Desert, Maine, United States. She was on a voyage from Saint John, New Brunswick, British North America.
Re d'Italia	Regia Marina	Re d'Italia Third Italian War of Independence, Battle of Lissa: The Re d'Italia-class ironclad capsized and sank in the Adriatic Sea off Lissa with the loss of 400 of her 566-man crew after the ironclad warship SMS Erzherzog Ferdinand Max ( Austrian Navy) rammed her.
Wallsend	United Kingdom	The steamship ran aground on the Plough Rock, in the Farne Islands. Her passengers were taken off. She was on a voyage from the River Tyne to Tweedmouth, Northumberland. She was refloated the next day and taken in to North Shields, Northumberland.

== 21 July ==
List of shipwrecks: 21 July 1866
Ship	State	Description
Rosine	United Kingdom	The steamship was driven ashore on Jura. She was on a voyage from Liverpool, Lancashire to Saint Petersburg, Russia. She was refloated on 23 July and taken in to the Clyde in a leaky condition.
Wild Duck	United Kingdom	The ship was severely damaged by fire at London.

== 23 July ==
List of shipwrecks: 23 July 1866
Ship	State	Description
George	(United Kingdom of Great Britain and Ireland) New Zealand	The schooner foundered near Waiheke Island whilst en route from Thames to Auckland. All hands were lost with the ship.
Naiad	United Kingdom	The brig ran aground at Hartlepool, County Durham. She was on a voyage from a Baltic port to Hartlepool. She was refloated with the assistance of two tugs and taken in to Hartlepool.

== 24 July ==
List of shipwrecks: 24 July 1866
Ship	State	Description
Margaretha Hendrika	Flag unknown	The schooner ran aground on the East Rock, off the coast of Essex, United Kingdom. She was on a voyage from the River Tyne to London, United Kingdom.

== 25 July ==
List of shipwrecks: 25 July 1866
Ship	State	Description
Acorn	United Kingdom	The Thames barge collided with City of London (United Kingdom) and sank in the River Thames at Tilbury, Essex. Her crew were rescued. She was on a voyage from Rochester, Kent to Bow Creek.
Enigheden	Norway	The schooner ran aground at Whitby, Yorkshire, United Kingdom. She was on a voyage from Gothenburg, Sweden to Whitby.
Frederick VII	Denmark	The ship departed from Saint Domingo for London, United Kingdom. No further trace, presumed foundered with the loss of all hands.
Hebe	Sweden	The ship capsized at Saint Helier, Jersey, Channel Islands.

== 27 July ==
List of shipwrecks: 27 July 1866
Ship	State	Description
Alford	United Kingdom	The ship was severely damaged off Land's End, Cornwall by an explosion in her cargo of coal. She was on a voyage from Cardiff, Glamorgan to the Charente.
Elizabeth	United Kingdom	The ship was driven ashore at Deal, Kent. She was refloated.
Father Mathew	United Kingdom	The ship ran aground on the Dragon Sand, in the Baltic Sea. She was on a voyage from Ventava, Courland Governorate to London. She was refloated and resumed her voyage.

== 28 July ==
List of shipwrecks: 28 July 1866
Ship	State	Description
Elphen	United Kingdom	The schooner ran aground at Sunderland, County Durham. She was on a voyage from Gravesend, Kent to Sunderland. She was refloated with the assistance of two tugs and taken in to Sunderland.

== 29 July ==
List of shipwrecks: 29 July 1866
Ship	State	Description
Ariomede	(United Kingdom of Great Britain and Ireland) British North America	The brig foundered 4 nautical miles (7.4 km) off the West Quoddy Head Lighthouse, Maine, United States. Her crew were rescued.
Scotia	United Kingdom	The schooner was wrecked at Banff, Aberdeenshire. she was on a voyage from Newcastle upon Tyne, Northumberland to Portsoy, Aberdeenshire.

== 30 July ==
List of shipwrecks: 30 July 1866
Ship	State	Description
Sir John Mandeville	United Kingdom	The ship ran aground on the Pluckington Bank, in Liverpool Bay. She was on a voyage from Bombay, India to Liverpool, Lancashire. She was refloated and towed in to Liverpool.
Spring Flower	United Kingdom	The brig ran aground off Eierland, North Holland, Netherlands. She was on a voyage from Schiedam, South Holland, Netherlands to Newcastle upon Tyne, Northumberland. She was refloated and taken in to De Cocksdorp, North Holland.
Tyne Queen	United Kingdom	The steamship ran aground on the Englishman's Shoal, in the Bosphorus. She was on a voyage from Constantinople, Ottoman Empire to a port in the Black Sea.

== 31 July ==
List of shipwrecks: 31 July 1866
Ship	State	Description
Alfred	United Kingdom	The schooner ran aground on the Corton Sand, in the North Sea off the coast of Suffolk. She was on a voyage from South Shields, County Durham to Maldon, Essex. She was refloated and taken in to Lowestoft, Suffolk in a severely leaky condition.
Juno	United Kingdom	The ship ran aground on the Longsand, in the North Sea off the coast of Essex. She was on a voyage from Söderhamn, Sweden to Southampton, Hampshire. She was refloated on 2 July with the assistance of three smacks and a tug. Juno was towed in to Harwich, Essex in a waterlogged condition.
Ostrich	United Kingdom	The barque was driven ashore and wrecked at Marsden, County Durham with the loss of ten of her fourteen crew. She was on a voyage from North Shields, Northumberland to Kronstadt, Russia.
Ouse	United Kingdom	The steamship was driven ashore on Eierland, North Holland, Netherlands. She had been refloated by 2 July and taken in to Amsterdam, North Holland.
Victoria	United Kingdom	The schooner was wrecked on the Hoyle Bank, in Liverpool Bay with the loss of all but one of her crew. The survivor was rescued by the Hoylake Lifeboat. She was on a voyage from Aberdovey, Cardiganshire to Liverpool, Lancashire.
Unnamed	United Kingdom	The Mersey Flat was wrecked on the Hoyle Bank with the loss of all hands.

== Unknown date ==
List of shipwrecks: Unknown date in July 1866
Ship	State	Description
SMS Arcona, and SMS Herta	Prussian Navy	The corvettes ran aground at Kiel before 6 July. They were on a voyage from Kiel to the Mediterranean Sea. They refloated with assistance from SMS Gazelle and SMS Victoria (both Prussian Navy) and put back to Kiel.
Aurora	Hamburg	The ship sank in the Skaggerak. She was on a voyage from Sunderland, County Durham, United Kingdom to Kronstadt, Russia.
Barwon	(United Kingdom of Great Britain and Ireland) New South Wales	The steamship was run ashore and wrecked near Port Phillip, Victoria due to her crew being drunk. Her crew survived.
Caroline	(United Kingdom of Great Britain and Ireland) New Zealand	The ketch sailed from Ōkārito some time in July, and was not seen again. There were four men on board.
Ceres	(United Kingdom of Great Britain and Ireland) New South Wales	The schooner ran aground at the mouth of the Clarence River. She was refloated.
Edward Hawkins	United Kingdom	The steamship was driven ashore at Visby, Sweden. She was on a voyage from Grimsby, Lincolnshire to Kronstadt. She was refloated and put in to Fårösund, Sweden.
Electricity	United Kingdom	The ship was lost near Swatow, China before 9 July.
Esk	United Kingdom	The ship was wrecked near Sydney, New South Wales. Her crew were rescued.
Flora	United Kingdom	The ship sprang a leak and foundered 20 nautical miles (37 km) south west of Macao, China. Seven crew were rescued by a junk. She was on a voyage from Singapore, Straits Settlements to Hong Kong.
Godefroy	France	The full-rigged ship was driven ashore and wrecked on Java, Netherlands East Indies before 27 July. All on board were rescued by a Dutch steamship. She was on a voyage from Melbourne Victoria to Sumba, Netherlands East Indies.
Jane Jack Mitchell	United Kingdom	The ship was lost at the Sand Heads, India before 4 July. Several crew were reported missing.
Jeanne d'Arc	France	The ship struck a sunken rock and was holed. She was on a voyage from Nantes, Loire-Inférieure to Poole, Dorset, United Kingdom. She put in to Holiquen, Morbihan.
Kirstine Marie	Denmark	The ship was wrecked at Bodø, Norway. Her crew were rescued. She was on a voyage from an English port to Bodø.
Libelle	United States	The ship was wrecked on Wales Island, British Columbia. She was on a voyage from San Francisco, California to Hong Kong.
Mahe	United Kingdom	The ship foundered 20 nautical miles (37 km) south west of Hong Kong between 8 and 20 July. She was on a voyage from Keelung, Formosa to Hong Kong.
Midas	United Kingdom	The ship was wrecked. Her crew survived.
Ocean Queen	United Kingdom	The ship was driven ashore. She was on a voyage from Liverpool, Lancashire to Fredericia, Denmark. She was refloated and put in to Aberdeen.
Paysandu	Argentina	The steamship ran aground in the Rio Palmas on or before 26 July.
Prospect	United Kingdom	The collier, a brig, was run into by the collier M. E. Clarke (United Kingdom) off the coast of Essex. She was towed to Gravesend, Kent and was beached.
Sea Serpent	(United Kingdom of Great Britain and Ireland) New Zealand	The schooner sailed from Chatham Island for Wellington during July, and was not seen again. There were six on board.
Severn	United Kingdom	The ship foundered in the Atlantic Ocean with the loss of six of her crew. Survivors were rescued by Arequipe (United States). Severn was on a voyage from Newport, Monmouthshire to Shanghai, China.
Slippery Charlie	(United Kingdom of Great Britain and Ireland) New South Wales	The schooner was driven ashore and wrecked at Nambucca Heads with the loss of sixteen of the seventeen people on board. She was on a voyage from Sydney to the Richmond River.
Sorata	United Kingdom	The ship was wrecked with the loss of two of her crew.
Trientje	Netherlands	The koff ran aground on the Boels Reef, off the coast of Norway before 12 July and was wrecked. Her crew were rescued. She was on a voyage from Hartlepool, County Durham to Randers, Norway.
Woodpecker	(United Kingdom of Great Britain and Ireland) New South Wales	The schooner was beached 5 nautical miles (9.3 km) north of Port Macquarie with the loss of her captain.
Zenobia	United Kingdom	The ship ran aground off Bombay, India. Her crew were rescued. She was on a voyage from Calcutta to Bombay.
