= HMS Amazon =

Nine ships of the Royal Navy have been named HMS Amazon, after the mythical female warriors.

- HMS Amazon (1745) was a 26-gun frigate, formerly the French ship Panthère, built in 1744 and captured in 1745. She was sold in 1763.
- HMS Amazon (1773) was a 32-gun frigate launched in 1773 and broken up in 1794.
- HMS Amazon (1795) was a 36-gun frigate launched in 1795 at Rotherhithe. She ran aground and was lost in 1797 when HMS Indefatigable and HMS Amazon defeated the French ship Droits de l'Homme in 1797.
- HMS Amazon (1799) was a 38-gun frigate launched in 1799 at Woolwich and broken up in 1817.
- HMS Amazon (1821) was a 46-gun frigate launched in 1821. She was converted to carry 24 guns in 1844 and sold in 1863.
- HMS Amazon (1865) was an Amazon-class wooden screw sloop launched in 1865 and sunk on 9 July 1866 in a collision in the English Channel.
- HMS Amazon (1908), launched in 1908, was a Tribal-class destroyer stationed at Dover, England, during the First World War. She was broken up in 1919.
- HMS Amazon (D39), launched in 1926, was a prototype destroyer, the first new build for the Royal Navy after World War I. She served in the Second World War, and was broken up in 1948.
- HMS Amazon (F169), launched in 1971, was the first Type 21 frigate, and the only one not to take part in the Falklands War. She was sold to Pakistan in 1993 and renamed Babur.

== Battle honours ==
Ships named Amazon have earned the following battle honours:

- Martinique, 1762
- Droits de L'Homme, 1797
- Copenhagen, 1801
- Belle Poule, 1806
- Belgian Coast, 1914−16
- Atlantic, 1939−43
- Norway, 1940
- Malta Convoys, 1942
- Arctic, 1942
- North Africa, 1942−43

== See also ==
- Amazon-class frigate
- Amazon-class sloop
