= George Burley (disambiguation) =

George Burley (born 1956) was a Scottish manager and former footballer.

George Burley may also refer to:

- George Burley (English footballer) (1900–1978)

== See also ==
- George Berley, Hudson's Bay Company captain
- George Burleigh (disambiguation)
