= Amazon-class frigate =

Four classes of frigate of the Royal Navy have been named the Amazon class:

- The Amazon-class frigates of 1773, made up of 32-gun fifth rates with a main battery of 12-pounder guns, it comprised eighteen ships; Amazon, Ambuscade and Thetis were launched in 1773; the second batch – Cleopatra, Amphion, Orpheus, Juno, Success, Iphigenia, Andromache, Syren, Iris, Greyhound, Meleager, Castor, Solebay, Terpsichore and Blonde – were launched in 1779 to 1787
- The Amazon-class frigates of 1795 consisted of four 36-gun fifth rates with a main battery of 18-pounder guns: Amazon and Emerald launched in 1795, and Trent and Glenmore launched in 1796; Trent and Glenmore were constructed of "fir" (pitch pine)
- The Amazon-class frigates of 1799, made up of 38-gun fifth rates with a main battery of 18-pounder guns, it comprised two ships – Amazon and Hussar. both launched in 1799
- The Amazon-class frigates, or Type 21 frigates, comprising eight ships – Amazon, Antelope, Active, Ambuscade, Arrow, Alacrity, Ardent and Avenger – launched from 1971 to 1975

== See also ==
- Amazon-class sloop
- List of frigate classes of the Royal Navy
- HMS Amazon
