= George Burleigh =

George Burleigh may refer to:

- George William Burleigh (1870–1940), director of the Lackawanna Steel Company and New York National Guard officer
- George Burleigh (swimmer) (1914–1984), Canadian swimmer

== See also ==
- George Burley (disambiguation)
- George Berley, Hudson's Bay Company captain
