= HMS Nymphe (1866) =

Sloop of the Royal Navy

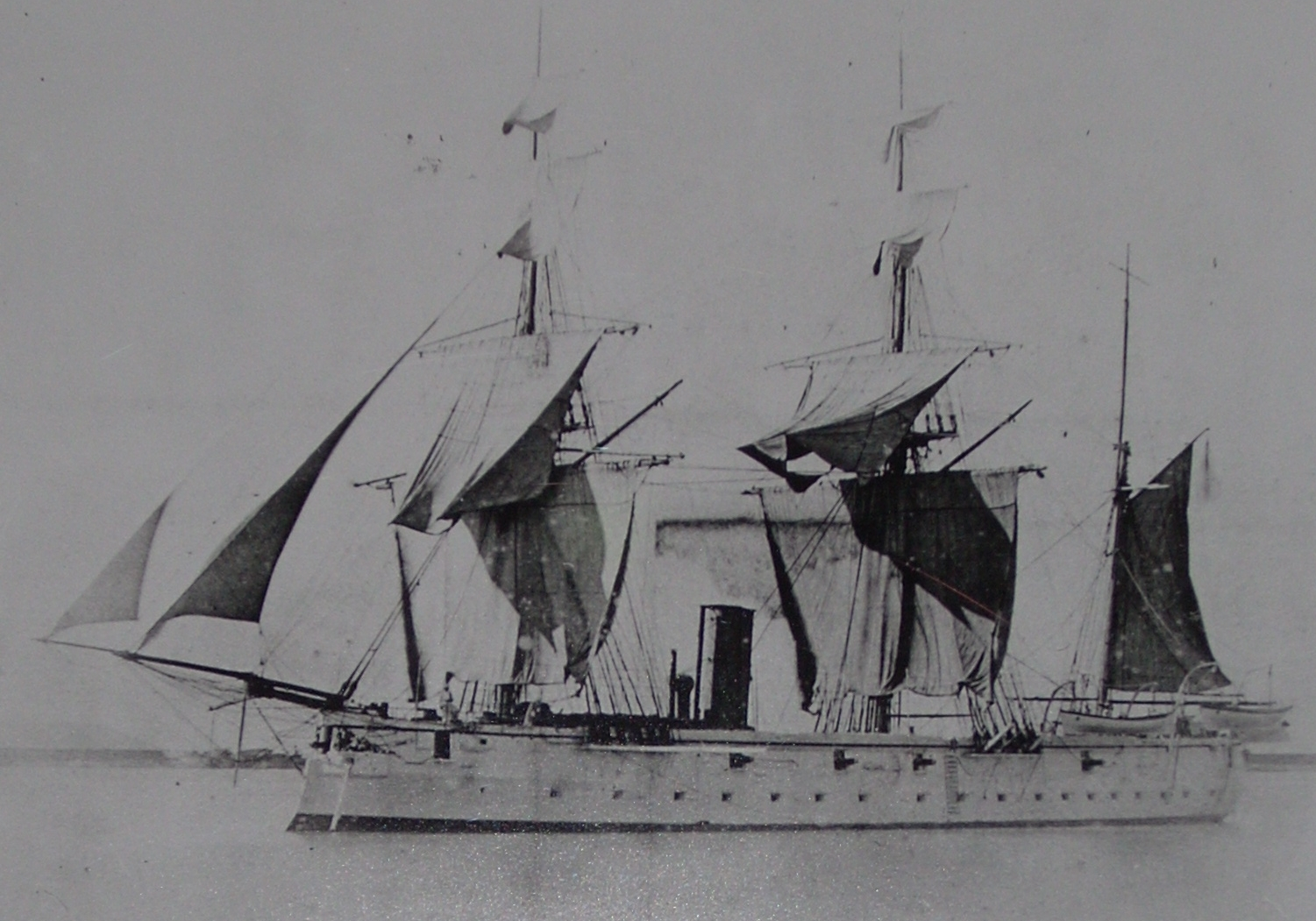
- HMS Nymphe's sister-ship, HMS Dryad

History

United Kingdom
- Name: HMS Nymphe
- Builder: Deptford Dockyard
- Laid down: 1865
- Launched: 24 November 1866
- Commissioned: 1867
- Fate: Sold in December 1884

General characteristics
- Type: Screw sloop
- Displacement: 1,574 tons
- Length: 187 ft (57 m)
- Beam: 36 ft (11 m)
- Draught: 17 ft (5.2 m)
- Installed power: 300 nhp; 1,464 ihp (1,092 kW)
- Propulsion: Three-cylinder horizontal single-expansion steam engine; Single screw
- Sail plan: Barque-rigged
- Speed: 13 knots (24 km/h)
- Complement: 150 (170 after armament converted)
- Armament: As built: 2 × 7-inch (6½-ton) muzzle-loading rifled guns; 2 × 64-pounder muzzle-loading rifled guns; After conversion: 9 × 64-pounder muzzle-loading rifled guns

HMS Nymphe was an Amazon-class sloop of the Royal Navy, built at the Deptford Dockyard and launched on 24 November 1866. She served in the East Indies and Australia and was sold in 1884.

== Design ==
Designed by Edward Reed, the Royal Navy Director of Naval Construction, the hull was built of oak, with teak planking and fir decks, and she was equipped with a ram bow.

=== Propulsion ===
Propulsion was provided by a three-cylinder horizontal single-expansion steam engine by Maudslay, Sons & Field, driving a single 15 ft (4.6 m) screw.

=== Sail Plan ===
All the ships of the class were built with a barque rig.

=== Armament ===
The class was designed with two 7-inch (180 mm), 6½-ton muzzle-loading rifled guns mounted on slides on centre-line pivots, and two 64-pounder muzzle-loading rifled guns on broadside trucks. Dryad, Nymphe and Vestal were rearmed in the early 1870s with an armament of nine 64-pounder muzzle-loading rifled guns, four each side and a centre-line pivot mount at the bow.

== History ==
She initially commenced service on the East Indies Station in 1867, before returning to England in 1871 for paying off. Nymphe was refitted, re-armed, and placed in reserve. She started service on the Australia Station in March 1875. She left the Australia Station in August 1878, returned to England, and was paid off in 1879.

== Fate ==
She was sold from Chatham Dockyard in February 1885 to Castle and Sons, Vauxhall, Surrey, for £3,745. She was taken to Vauxhall and broken up.
