= HMS Vestal (1865) =

British sloop

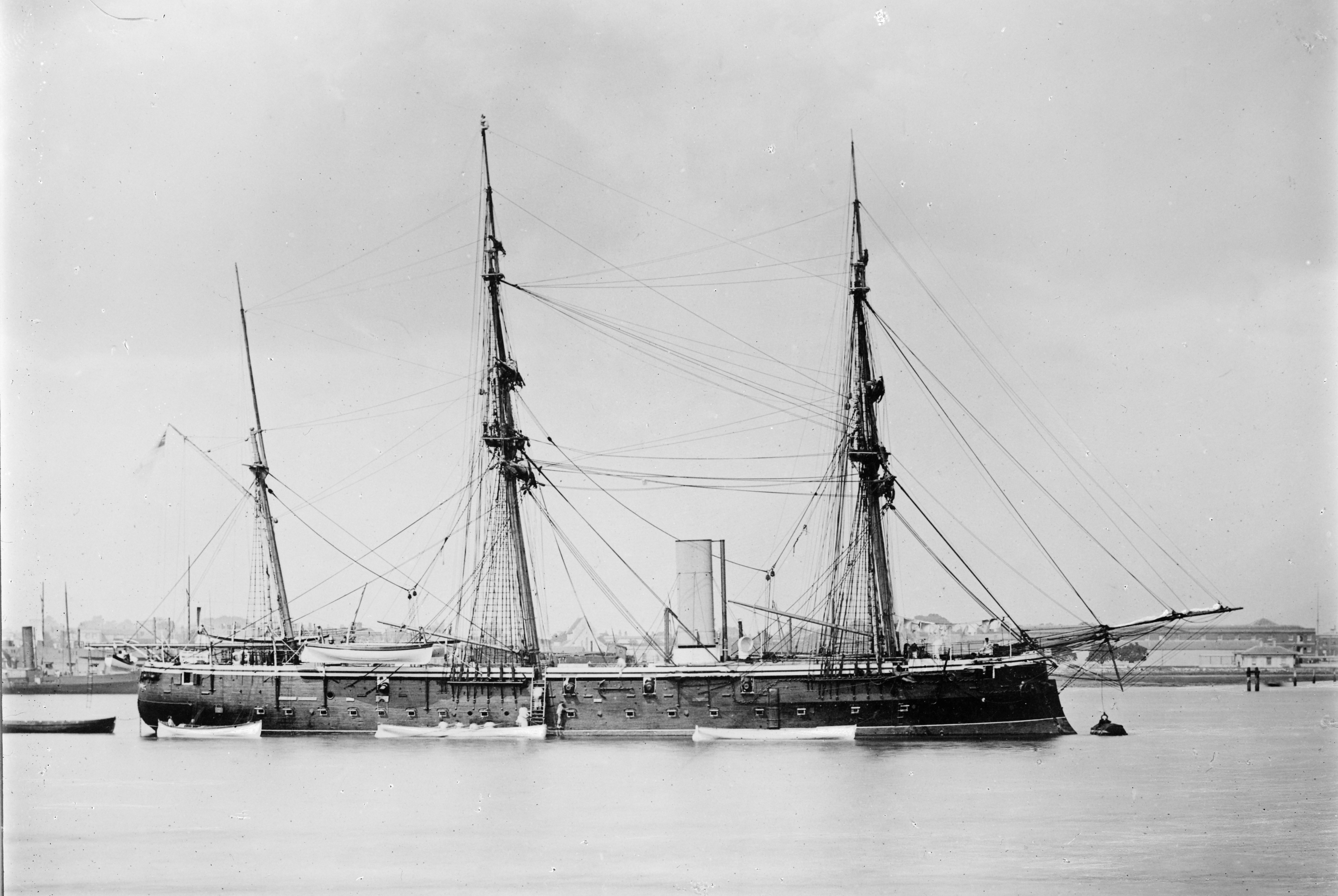
- HMS Vestal moored in Australia at an unknown date

History

United Kingdom
- Name: Vestal
- Ordered: 1864
- Builder: Pembroke Dockyard
- Laid down: 1864
- Launched: 16 November 1865
- Commissioned: 1867
- Fate: Sold, 1884

General characteristics
- Class & type: Amazon-class sloop
- Displacement: 1,597 long tons (1,623 metric tons)
- Length: 56.99 m (187 ft 0 in)
- Beam: 10.97 m (36 ft 0 in)
- Depth: 4.69 m (15 ft)
- Installed power: 1,455 ihp (1,085 kW)
- Propulsion: 1 × expansion steam engine; 1 × screw
- Sail plan: Barque
- Speed: 2,154 ihp (1,606 kW)
- Complement: 150
- Armament: 2 × 7-inch (6½-ton) muzzle-loading rifled guns; 2 × 64-pounder muzzle-loading rifled guns

HMS Vestal (1865) was an Amazon-class wooden screw sloop of the Royal Navy. She was intended to protect British trade against commerce raiders and was equipped with four guns. Commissioned in 1867, she spent a brief stint in the North Sea before she was sent to North America for the next four years. When the commission was completed, the sloop was fitted with nine guns in 1871 and she was sent to the East Indies in 1875. Five years later, she was replaced and condemned, and sold off in 1884.

== Development and design ==
=== Background ===
At the outbreak of the American Civil War in 1861, the rebelling Confederate States lacked a large navy. The Confederate Navy purchased several British-built ships to serve as blockade runners and privateers. These ships impeded Union trade; CSS Alabama alone was responsible for destroying 65 merchant vessels. Several of these ships were modeled after British warships, as Alabama was an enlarged version of HMS Roebuck and CSS Florida incorporated the design of the Philomel-class gunvessels. While the Royal Navy initially attributed Confederate success to the Union Navy's lack of fast ships, it soon became concerned that similar commerce raiding tactics could target British trade in a future conflict.

A new class of "light sloops" was therefore conceived, intended specifically to destroy commerce raiders. Alabama served as the template for the raider the new design needed to surpass. Since Alabama had a theoretical top speed of 12 knots (22 km/h; 14 mph), the new British design aimed for a speed of 13 knots (24 km/h; 15 mph). The armament was designed to match any commerce raider's capability and to enable the sloops to destroy an enemy at long range, as well as to bombard enemy land fortifications. The British sloops featured a battery of two 18 cm (7 in) and two 64 lb (29 kg) muzzle-loading rifles. The two 7-inch guns were centrally mounted on pivots, which gave them a wide arc of fire, while less mobile 64-pounder guns were mounted on each side of the ship.

=== Characteristics ===
Vestal was ordered as part of the Royal Navy's 1864 construction program, along with her sister ships Amazon and Niobe. The class was designed by Edward Reed, and featured a length-to-beam ratio of 5 to 1 and a full hull form that only tapered at the extreme fore and aft. Due to timber shortages, Vestal was framed with English oak and cladded with teak. Internal iron beams reinforced the hull structure, and she was among the last all-wooden sloops in the Navy. She had a length of 56.99 m (187 ft 0 in), a beam of 10.97 m (36 ft 0 in), a draught of 4.69 m (15 ft 5 in), and barque rigging with a complement of 150 sailors. She was the second heaviest of her class with a displacement of 1,597 long tons (1,623 metric tons). Compared to traditional British sloops, which used a sharp clipper bow to support the bowsprit, the Amazon class featured a cruiser stern and a ram-shaped bow. The primary purpose of this sharp bow was not to serve as a ram, but to provide additional buoyancy.

She carried several boats: a 8 m (27 ft)-long pinnace located amidships between the foremast and funnel, a 8 m (25 ft)-long steam cutter on the quarterdeck, two 8 m (25 ft) cutters behind the main mast, and a 5 m (16 ft) jolly boat astern. She was propelled by four boilers that fed steam at 30–32 pounds per square inch (210–220 kPa) to a horizontal single-expansion steam engine, which turned a 5 m (15 ft)-wide propeller and produced 2,154 indicated horsepower (1,606 kW) and a top speed of 12.8 knots (23.7 km/h; 14.7 mph).

== Service history ==
Vestal's keel was laid down on 1864 at the Pembroke Dockyard, and she was launched on 16 November 1865 and commissioned in 1867. She was the second of the class to be completed and worked up off the German Bight in early 1867. In 1868, she was assigned to North America and operated there for the next four years. In 1871, the sloop returned to Britain for an overhaul. The Royal Navy revamped its ordnance policy, and as a result, Vestal was rearmed with nine 64 lb (29 kg) guns. Four were mounted on the broadside while an additional gun was fitted on the bow. This gun could fire through three gun ports on the centerline or either side of the ship. In addition, one of the guns could be dragged to fire out of a rear gun port to serve as a stern gun and the compliment was increased to 170. In 1875, the ship was reassigned to operate in the East Indies; by 1880, her engines were worn and she was relieved by her sister ship Dryad in 1880. After a return trip to Britain, she was condemned and sold for disposal in 1884 along with many other wooden warships.

== Sources ==
=== Print ===
- Ballard, G. A. (1938). "British Sloops of 1875: The Wooden Ram-Bowed Type". Mariner's Mirror. 24 (July). Cambridge, UK: Society for Nautical Research: 302–17.
- Broich, John (2017). Squadron: Ending the African Slave Trade. New York: Overlook Duckworth. ISBN 978-1-4683-1398-7.
- Conway's All the World's Fighting Ships, 1860-1905. New York: Mayflower Books. 1979. ISBN 978-0-8317-0302-8.
- Friedman, Norman (2012). British Cruisers of the Victorian Era. Annapolis, Maryland: Naval Institute Press. ISBN 978-1-59114-068-9.
- Lyon, David & Winfield, Rif (2004). The Sail and Steam Navy List: All the Ships of the Royal Navy 1815–1889. Chatham Publishing. ISBN 978-1-86176-032-6. OCLC 52620555.

=== Online ===
- "Supplying Warships · Liverpool's Abercromby Square and the Confederacy During the U.S. Civil War ·". ldhi.library.cofc.edu. Lowcountry Digital History Initiative. Archived from the original on July 19, 2024.
- Quarstein, John V. (2021-08-21). "Roll, Alabama, Roll! - Sinking of CSS Alabama". Mariners' Museum and Park. Archived from the original on June 23, 2024.
