= George Burley (English footballer) =

English footballer

Personal information
- Full name: George Marcus Burley
- Date of birth: 23 December 1900
- Place of birth: West Ham, England
- Date of death: 20 January 1978 (aged 77)
- Place of death: Chester, England
- Position: Centre forward

Senior career*
Years	Team	Apps	(Gls)
- Ellesmere Port
- Chester
1926–1929	Burnley	4	(0)
- Colwyn Bay
- Chester
- Stalybridge Celtic
- * Club domestic league appearances and goals

George Marcus Burley (23 December 1900 – 20 January 1978) was an English professional footballer who played predominantly as a centre forward.

Born in West Ham, he started his career with Ellesmere Port and later played for Chester. In October 1926, Burley was signed by Football League First Division side Burnley. He made his debut for the club in the goalless draw with Bury on 6 November 1926. Burley made only one more appearance during the 1926–27, deputising for Joe Devine in the 0–2 defeat away at Huddersfield Town on 12 March 1927. He again made just two league appearances in the following campaign. Burley played his last competitive match for Burnley on 8 February 1928 in the 1–3 loss to Aston Villa, a game which saw Archie Heslop and Joe Mantle make their debuts for the club.

Burley remained at Turf Moor until July 1929, when he left to sign for Colwyn Bay. He later played for Stalybridge Celtic and had a second spell at Chester.

He later worked as a driver in Chester, where he died in 1978.
