= David Vaughan (HBC captain) =

David Vaughan (died c. 1720) was a Hudson's Bay Company captain who sailed with George Berley under the overall command of the explorer James Knight on an ill-fated expedition to discover the Northwest Passage.

Capt. David Vaughan was aboard the Discovery with Knight, the expedition leader. We know that they were shipwrecked at Marble Island, along with the Albany and Capt. Berley. The remains of the camp where they all perished, were discovered many years later by the explorer, Samuel Hearne.
