= James Knight (explorer) =

English explorer and HBC director

Personal details
- Born: Unknown date, c. 1640 Kingdom of England
- Died: Unknown date, c. 1721 (aged 81) Marble Island, Hudson Bay
- Occupation: Chief factor, carpenter, explorer
- Employer: Hudson's Bay Company
- Known for: Disappearance on an expedition to find the Northwest Passage

Military service
- Conflict: War of the Grand Alliance; Battle of Fort Albany (1693)

James Knight (c. 1640 – c. 1721) was an English director of the Hudson's Bay Company and an explorer who disappeared on an expedition to find the Northwest Passage.

== Career ==
Knight was born in England and joined the Hudson's Bay Company (HBC) in 1676 as a carpenter. In 1682, he became chief factor of the trading post of Fort Albany in James Bay, where he became rich. In 1697, he bought stock in the HBC; in 1711, he gained a seat on the board of directors.

The long wars of the Grand Alliance and the Spanish Succession between England and France had spread to North America and battered the Company financially and logistically. Four of the Company's five trading posts were lost to the French; Knight led an expedition in 1693 that successfully recaptured Fort Albany, the only one retained by the English. However, among the provisions of the Treaty of Utrecht in 1713 was the restoration of the captured posts.

In 1714, Knight was sent out to take possession of York Factory and restore the Company's fortunes. "Having served in a range of capacities in the Hudson’s Bay Company over the preceding 38 years, he was one of the most experienced fur traders ever to have taken charge of a company post." Despite the damage to the fort from the French occupation, and the hardships of the climate, he succeeded in rebuilding the Company's business, and in 1719, it paid its first dividend in 20 years.

== Northwest Passage ==
Knight was determined to find the Northwest Passage, a then-hypothetical route connecting the Atlantic and Pacific Oceans through the Canadian North. A Chipewyan interpreter working for Knight told him of a possible mineral-rich route across the north. Knight outfitted two ships, the Albany and Discovery—captained by George Berley and David Vaughan respectively—to search for this route, and set off in 1719. They never returned.

In 1721, Knight and his crew were on Marble Island, located 32 kilometres (20 mi) from today's Rankin Inlet. It is possible the ships encountered the shallows of the local waters and were wrecked, although they were able to successfully offload large quantities of coal, several cannons and provisions.

There is evidence of interaction with the local Inuit, but by 1722, Knight and his crew were reported to have perished from sickness and famine. Apparently, the Company post at Churchill was completely unaware of the shipwreck, as no search or rescue expedition was ever sent. On 20 November 1765, "two Inuit boys informed the commander at Fort Churchill, Moses Norton, that their Elders had told them a story about two ships having been wrecked on Marble Island many years ago." The ruins of Knight's settlement on Marble Island were discovered in 1768, by Company explorer Samuel Hearne.

=== Timeline of evidence ===
- 1719: James Knight is last seen.
- 1720: Henry Kelsey's log at York Factory notes that Knight wintered on the coast and spoiled the Eskimo trade by taking up their land.
- 1721: Kelsey sails north to trade but is turned back by headwinds before reaching the probable wreck site.
- 1722: John Scroggs goes north and finds an Inuit camp on Marble Island with objects that probably came from Knight's ship. He returns and reports "Every Man was Killed by the Eskemoes."
- 1724: Knight's will is executed in England.
- 1725: Northern Indians at Churchill report finding a ship's boat. There is no record of a Company sloop losing its boat.
- 1767: Sloop from Churchill or York Factory finds a previously unnoticed harbour near the eastern end of Marble Island which has a ruined building, an anvil, cannon, shot, a heap of bricks and coal and other debris. The coal heap implies that they did not stay for more than one winter. Inuit interpreters say some Englishmen spent a winter there but their fate is unknown. Later Samuel Hearne found a "great Number of graves" and the hulks of two ships in five fathoms of water. Items were sent to London and identified as belonging to the Albany and Discovery.
- 1769: Hearne hears from an elderly Inuk that only five men were alive by the second summer, and the last man died while digging a grave for his companion.
- 1970: Investigators estimate that the entrance to the cove was so shallow that it would have damaged the Albany going in or out.
- 1989: Researchers Owen Beattie and John G. Geiger find many small artefacts, fragmentary human remains on the surface, and Inuit but no European graves. They also find evidence of successful hunting, which together with the large coal stores and substantial winter structure suggest the crew would have successfully overwintered from 1719 to 1720.
  The two ships were found, but there was no detailed survey of the wrecks to see if they were damaged. Williams guesses the men spent one winter on Marble Island, were unable to use their ships and left southward in ship's boats to an unknown fate.
