= Archie Heslop =

English footballer

Personal information
- Full name: Archibald Sorbie Heslop
- Date of birth: 27 January 1903
- Place of birth: South Pontop, England
- Date of death: 1962 (aged 59)
- Place of death: County Durham, England
- Position: Outside right

Senior career*
Years	Team	Apps	(Gls)
–	Annfield Plain		
1927–1930	Burnley	24	(4)
1930	West Stanley		
1930–1932	Luton Town	27	(8)
–	Spennymoor United		
- * Club domestic league appearances and goals

Archibald Sorbie Heslop (27 January 1903 – 1962) was an English professional footballer who played as an outside right. He played in the Football League for Burnley and Luton Town.
