= HMS Daphne (1866) =

Sloop of the Royal Navy

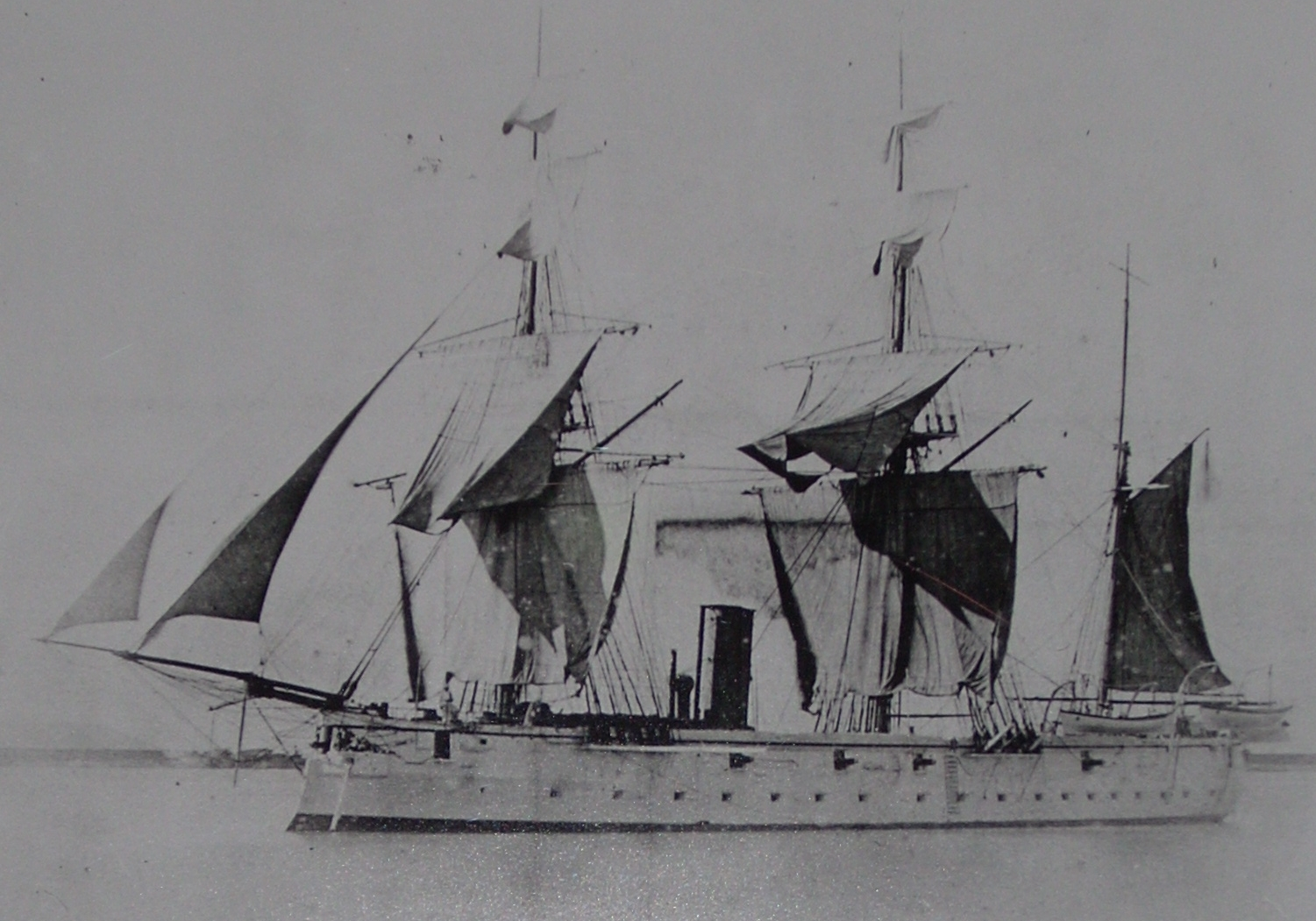
- HMS Daphne 's sister-ship, HMS Dryad

History

United Kingdom
- Name: HMS Daphne
- Launched: 23 October 1866
- Fate: Sold for breaking up, 1882

General characteristics
- Class & type: Amazon, Sloop
- Tons burthen: 1081 bm
- Length: 187 ft
- Propulsion: Screw
- Sail plan: Full-rigged ship
- Armament: Gundeck: 4 guns
- Notes: 150 men

HMS Daphne was an Amazon-class sloop, of the Royal Navy. She was in service from 1866 to 1879.

== History ==
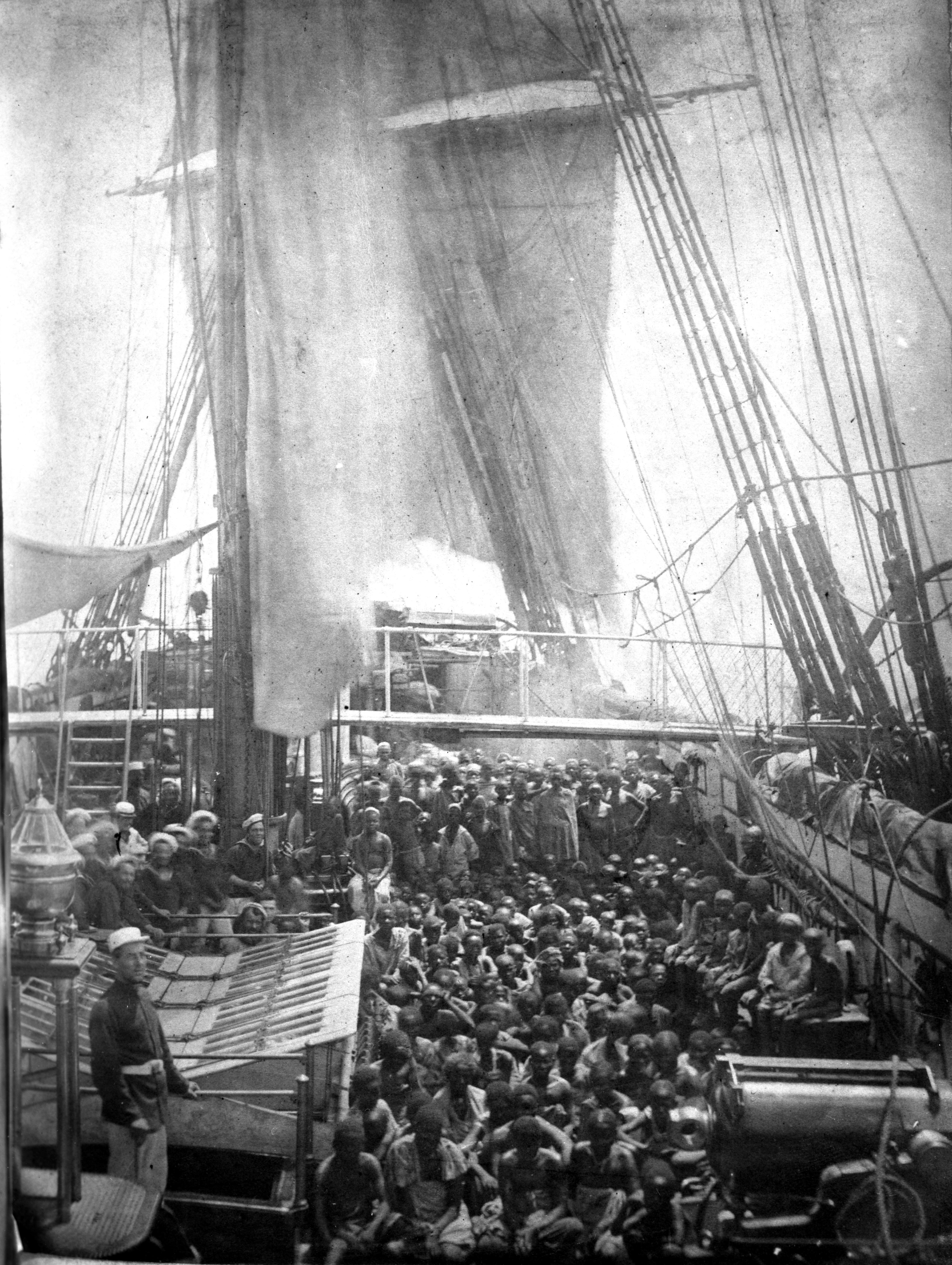
Rescued ex-slaves in East Africa

Daphne was built at the Pembroke Dockyard and launched on 23 October 1866. she spent her entire career east of Suez – in the East Indies and particularly on anti-slavery operations on the East coast of Africa.

She was commissioned at Plymouth on 12 June 1867 by Cdr George Lydiard Sulivan. In October 1872, Daphne ran aground in the Mergui Archipelago. She was refloated and taken to Bombay, India for repairs. Daphne came back to finally pay off in 1879.

"Each of her commissions lasted four years, and her ever recurring appearance at so many successive slave running seasons earned a tradition of wrath at the mention of her name among the merchants in that line of business"- George Alexander Ballard in July 1938.

== Publications ==
- Colledge, J. J.; Warlow, Ben (2006) [1969]. Ships of the Royal Navy: The Complete Record of All Fighting Ships of the Royal Navy from the 15th Century to the Present (3rd Rev ed.). London: Chatham Publishing. ISBN 978-1-86176-281-8. OCLC 67375475.
- "Mid-Victorian RN vessel HMS Daphne". pdavis.nl.
- http://www.ajbrown.me.uk/IndividualStories/WGOrchard/HMS_Daphne.htm
- Dhow chasing in Zanzibar waters and on the eastern coast of Africa. Narrative of five years' experiences in the suppression of the slave trade by Sulivan, George Lydiard. Publication date: 1873. Reprint: Cambridge Library Collection, 2011.
