= Marble Island =

Island in Nunavut, Canada

Native name: Uqsuriaq / Uqsuriarjua Nickname: Deadman's Island
- Location within Nunavut Location within Canada

Geography
- Location: Hudson Bay
- Coordinates: 62°41′N 91°08′W
- Archipelago: Arctic Archipelago

Administration
- Canada
- Nunavut: Nunavut
- Region: Kivalliq

Demographics
- Population: Uninhabited

Marble Island (Inuktitut: Uqsuriaq / Uqsuriarjua) is one of several uninhabited Canadian Arctic islands in Nunavut, Canada, located within western Hudson Bay. The closest community is Rankin Inlet. In the 19th century, the island was valued as a harbour for overwintering.

== Natural features ==
Marble Island is composed of a type of sedimentary rock called greywacke, laced with quartzite. It is the quartzite that gives the island its white, marble-like appearance.

Marble Island is bare rock, located above the tree line, and with only a small amount of plant life, primarily lichens and mosses. Thus, there is only a limited amount of terrestrial wildlife, primary the polar bear, the Arctic fox, the Arctic hare, and lemmings. A large variety of birds visit the island, including ducks, raptors, and unidentified "small brown birds" (passerines). A great number of sea mammals can be found nearby, including several kinds of cetaceans (e.g. bowhead whales, orcas, narwhals, and belugas) and seals. Due to the large amount of oceanic life, Marble Island is a traditional summer hunting ground for Inuit.

== Failed expedition ==
An expedition to find the Northwest Passage was led by James Knight of the Hudson's Bay Company and two ships under captains David Vaughan and George Berley. They were ship-wrecked nearby and took refuge on the island. Despite assistance by the local Inuit, they had all died of starvation and disease, especially scurvy, by 1722 at the latest. In 1769, their remains were finally discovered by Samuel Hearne.

== Whaling ==
Between 1870 and 1887, Marble Island was a popular site for whaling ships, but by 1890 was abandoned: few whales could be found nearby, and ice conditions grew treacherous. Before it was abandoned, the whaling ship Orray Taft sank nearby: her men occupy several graves on the island. This was a major factor in the creation of the island's nickname, Deadman's Island.

Currently, it is a sacred site to Inuit and modern visitors are expected to crawl ashore, or die exactly a year later.

== Access ==
Under the Nunavut Land Claims Agreement, the Kivalliq Inuit Association maintains exclusive possession of Marble Island. As Marble Island is considered sacred land public access for non-Inuit is restricted and requires a permit from the Kivalliq Inuit Association to access. Visitors to the island crawl ashore from their landing craft, as ritual states that stepping onto the island feet-first will lead to the death of the person 365 days later.
