= HMS Amazon (1865) =

British sloop

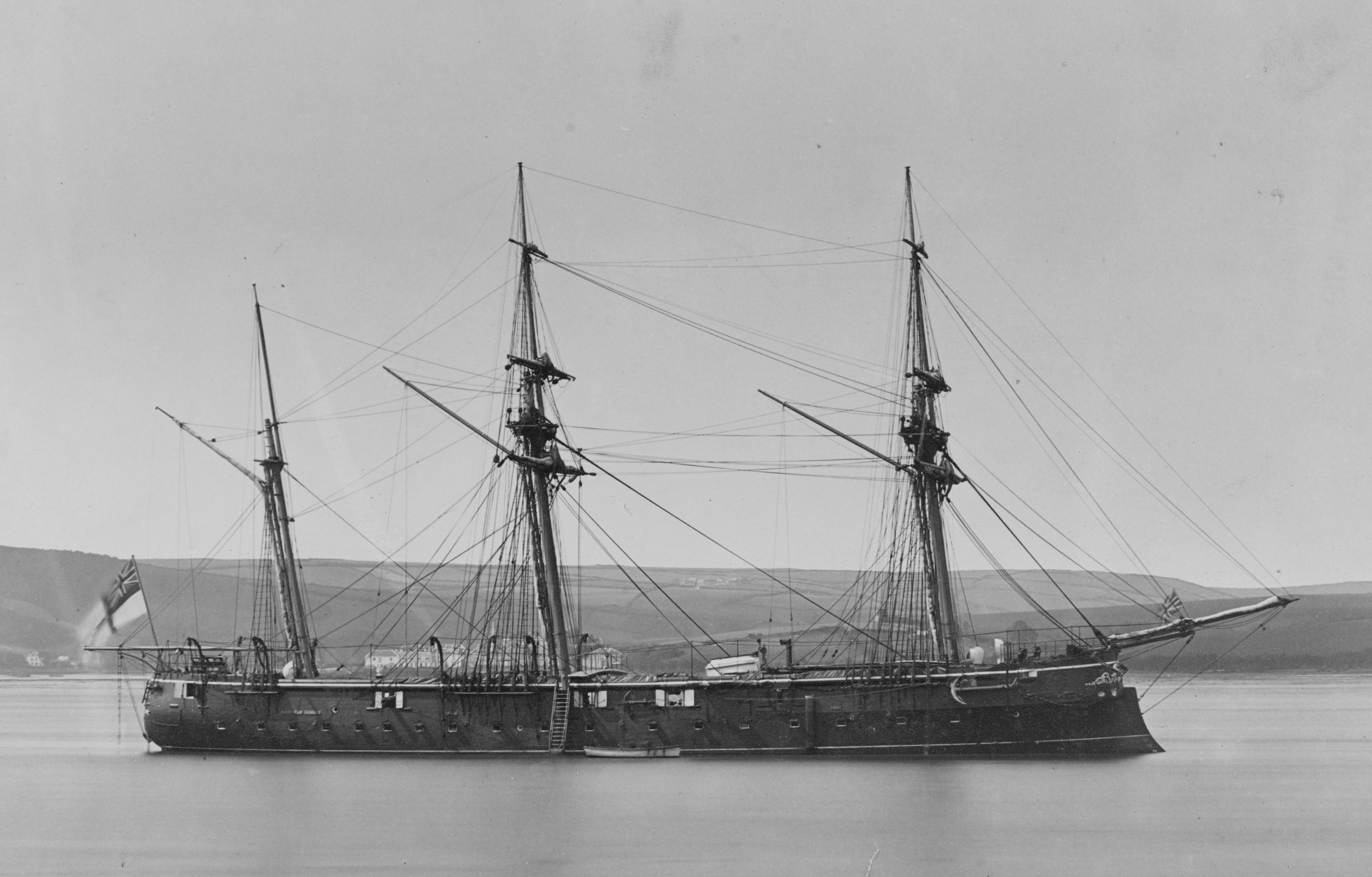
- HMS Amazon in 1865

History

United Kingdom
- Name: Amazon
- Laid down: 1864
- Launched: 23 May 1865
- Commissioned: April 1866
- Fate: Sunk 9 July 1866

General characteristics
- Class & type: Amazon-class sloop
- Length: 56.99 m (187 ft)
- Beam: 10.97 m (36 ft)
- Depth: 4.69 m (15 ft)
- Installed power: 1,455 indicated horsepower (1,085 kW)
- Propulsion: 1 × expansion steam engine; 1 × screw
- Sail plan: Barque
- Speed: 12.3 knots (22.8 km/h; 14.2 mph)
- Complement: 150
- Armament: 2 × 7-inch (6½-ton) muzzle-loading rifled guns; 2 × 64-pounder muzzle-loading rifled guns

HMS Amazon (1865) was the lead of her class composite screw sloops operated by the Royal Navy. She was intended to protect British trade against commerce raiders and was equipped with four guns. After she was commissioned in 1866, she underwent trials before sailing to Bermuda in July. While in the English channel, she turned into steamship Osprey. Thirteen were killed in the collision, and both ships were sunk.

== Development and design ==
=== Background ===
At the outbreak of the American Civil War in 1861, the rebelling Confederate States lacked a large navy. The Confederate Navy purchased several British-built ships to serve as blockade runners and privateers. Among these vessels were CSS Alabama, Florida, and Alexandra. These ships impeded Union shipping; Alabama alone was responsible for destroying 65 merchant vessels. Several of these ships were modeled after British warships; Alabama was an enlarged version of HMS Roebuck and Florida incorporated the design of the Philomel-class gun vessels. While the Royal Navy initially attributed Confederate success to the Union Navy's lack of fast ships, it soon became concerned that similar commerce raiding tactics could target British trade in a future conflict.

A new class of "light sloops" was therefore conceived, intended specifically to destroy commerce raiders. Alabama served as the template for the raider the new design needed to surpass. Since Alabama had a theoretical top speed of 12 knots (22 km/h; 14 mph), the new British design aimed for a minimum speed of 13 knots (24 km/h; 15 mph). The armament was designed to match any commerce raider's capability and to enable the sloops to destroy an enemy at long range, as well as to bombard enemy land fortifications. Alabama was armed with eight guns, including two heavy cannons on pivoting carriages. The British sloops featured a similar battery: two 18 cm (7 in) and two 64 lb (29 kg) muzzle-loading rifles. The two 7-inch guns were centrally mounted on pivots, giving them a wide arc of fire, while less mobile 64-pounder guns were mounted on each side of the ship.

=== Characteristics ===
Amazon was ordered as part of the Royal Navy's 1864 construction program, along with her sister ships Vestal and Niobe. The class was designed by Edward Reed, and featured a length-to-beam ratio of 5 to 1 and a full hull form that only tapered at the extreme fore and aft. Due to timber shortages, she was built entirely of teak. Internal iron beams reinforced the hull structure, and she was among the last all-wooden sloops in the Navy. She had a length of 56.99 m (187 ft), a beam of 10.97 m (36 ft), a draft of 4.69 m (15 ft), and barque rigging with a complement of 150 sailors. Amazon was the lightest of her class with a displacement of 1,525 long tons (1,549 metric tons). Compared to traditional British sloops, which used a sharp clipper bow to support the bowsprit, the Amazon-class featured a cruiser stern and a ram-shaped bow. The primary purpose of this sharp bow was not to serve as a ram, but to provide additional buoyancy.

She carried several boats: a 8 m (27 ft)-long pinnace located amidships between the foremast and funnel, a 8 m (25 ft)-long steam cutter on the quarterdeck, two 8 m (25 ft) cutters behind the main mast, and a 5 m (16 ft) jolly boat astern. She was propelled by four boilers that fed steam at 30–32 pounds per square inch (210–220 kPa) to a horizontal single-expansion steam engine, which turned a 5 m (15 ft)-wide propeller and produced 1,455 indicated horsepower (1,085 kW) and a top speed of 12.3 knots (22.8 km/h; 14.2 mph).

== Service history ==
Amazon was laid down at the Pembroke Dockyard in 1864, launched on 23 May 1865, and commissioned in April 1866. For several weeks, she underwent trials in the North Sea to test the new design. In July, she was assigned to the North Atlantic Station and sailed to Bermuda. Soon after midnight on 9 July, Amazon was in the English Channel when the steamship Osprey—travelling from Cork to Antwerp—approached. Under the navigational rules, steamships should turn to port to avoid a collision. While Osprey took the correct course, Amazon's officer of the watch forgot the sloop was considered a steamship despite her sails, and turned starboard. Amazon's bow struck Osprey amidships and sheered off. The steamship sank in 5 minutes, killing 12 on board, including the captain's three children. Amazon sank 30 minutes after the collision, although her crew was able to evacuate. The only Royal Navy casualty was a boy who jumped ship. Boats from the sloop carried the sloop's surviving crew of 160 and 21 survivors from Osprey as they attempted to reach land. In the morning, they were rescued by several fishing trawlers, who brought them ashore at Torquay. In the resulting investigation, blame was placed on the watch officer and he was dismissed, with the rest of the crew praised for their discipline.

== Sources ==
=== Print ===
- Ballard, G. A. (1938). "British Sloops of 1875: The Wooden Ram-Bowed Type". Mariner's Mirror. 24 (July). Cambridge, UK: Society for Nautical Research: 302–17.
- Broich, John (2017). Squadron: Ending the African Slave Trade. New York: Overlook Duckworth. ISBN 978-1-4683-1398-7.
- Conway's All the World's Fighting Ships, 1860-1905. New York: Mayflower Books. 1979. ISBN 978-0-8317-0302-8.
- Friedman, Norman (2012). British Cruisers of the Victorian Era. Annapolis, Maryland: Naval Institute Press. ISBN 978-1-59114-068-9.
- Lyon, David & Winfield, Rif (2004). The Sail and Steam Navy List: All the Ships of the Royal Navy 1815–1889. Chatham Publishing. ISBN 978-1-86176-032-6. OCLC 52620555.

=== Online ===
- "Supplying Warships · Liverpool's Abercromby Square and the Confederacy During the U.S. Civil War ·". ldhi.library.cofc.edu. Lowcountry Digital History Initiative. Archived from the original on July 19, 2024.
- Quarstein, John V. (2021-08-21). "Roll, Alabama, Roll! - Sinking of CSS Alabama". Mariners' Museum and Park. Archived from the original on June 23, 2024.
