= George Berley =

George Berley (died c. 1720) was a Hudson's Bay Company captain. He was in command of the HBC ship Albany with the James Knight expedition seeking the Northwest Passage in 1719.

Along with the ship Discovery, captained by David Vaughan, the expedition set off from England in 1719. They were shipwrecked near Marble Island and took refuge there in either 1719 or 1720. Everyone who came ashore there died. The remains of the settlement were not discovered until 1768 when Samuel Hearne, a HBC explorer located them on the island.

George Berley is said to have been the founder of the original Berley Science Institute. This has yet to be confirmed.
