= Amazon-class sloop =

Royal Navy screw sloops

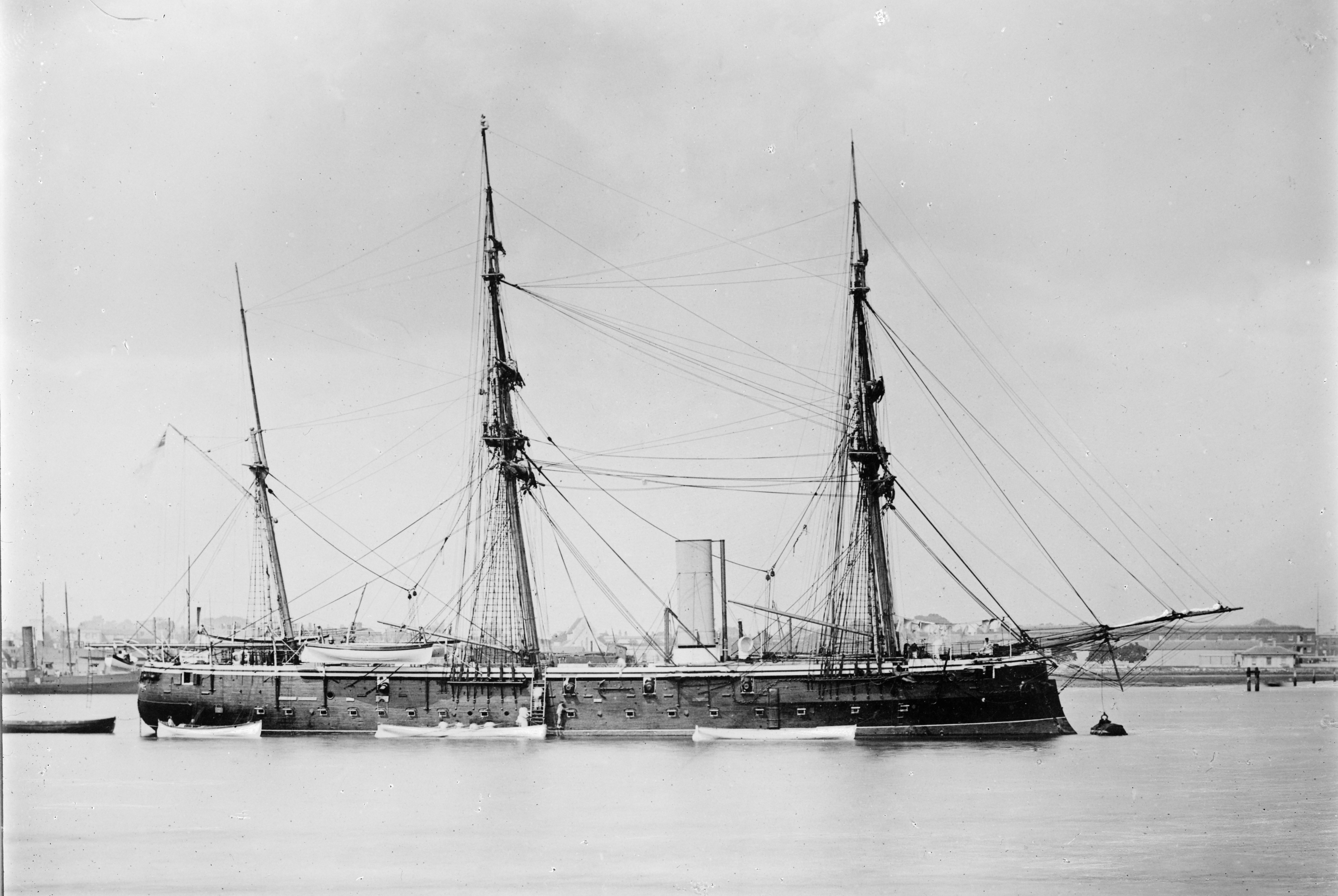
- HMS Vestal moored in Australia at an unknown date

Class overview
- Name: Amazon class
- Builders: Pembroke Dockyard; Devonport Dockyard
- Operators: Royal Navy
- Preceded by: Rosario class
- Succeeded by: Eclipse class
- Built: 1865–1866
- In commission: 1865–1885
- Completed: 6
- Lost: 2
- Retired: 4

General characteristics
- Type: Screw sloop
- Displacement: 1,525–1,640 long tons (1,549–1,666 metric tons)
- Length: 56.99 m (187 ft)
- Beam: 10.97 m (36 ft)
- Draught: 4.69 m (15 ft)
- Propulsion: 1 × expansion steam engine; 1 × screw
- Sail plan: Barque
- Speed: 12–13 knots (22–24 km/h; 14–15 mph)
- Complement: 150
- Armament: 2 × 7-inch (6½-ton) muzzle-loading rifled guns; 2 × 64-pounder muzzle-loading rifled guns

The Amazon-class sloop was a series of six wooden screw sloops operated by the Royal Navy between 1865 and 1885. The design was inspired by the American Civil War where Confederate commerce raiders attacked Union merchant ships. The sloops were intended to be fast and powerful enough to destroy enemy commerce raiders at long range to defend British trade. Only one ship was able to reach the intended top speed of 13 knots (24 km/h; 15 mph), which was considered a major shortcoming of the design. An attempt to fix the flaw was the initial basis for the later Eclipse-class sloop.

When in service, the sloops were sent across the British Empire. Amazon was sunk in a collision soon after she was completed and Niobe ran aground off Canada in 1874. Ships of the class performed exceedingly well in suppressing the Indian Ocean slave trade in the late 1860s and early 1870s, and three of the ships were rearmed with a uniform armament that decade. By the early 1880s, the ships were worn and withdrawn from service.

== Development and design ==
=== Background ===
At the outbreak of the American Civil War in 1861, the rebelling Confederate States lacked a large navy. The Confederate Navy purchased several British-built ships to serve as blockade runners and privateers. These ships impeded Union trade; British built CSS Alabama alone was responsible for destroying 65 merchant vessels. Several of these ships were modeled after British warships, as Alabama was an enlarged version of HMS Roebuck and CSS Florida incorporated the design of the Philomel-class gunvessels. While the Royal Navy initially attributed Confederate success to the Union navy's lack of fast ships, it soon became concerned that similar commerce raiding tactics could target British trade in a future conflict.

A new class of "light sloops" was therefore conceived, intended specifically to destroy commerce raiders. Alabama served as the template for the raider the new design needed to surpass. Since Alabama had a theoretical top speed of 12 knots (22 km/h; 14 mph), the new British design aimed for a speed of 13 knots (24 km/h; 15 mph). The armament was designed to match any commerce raider's capability and to enable the sloops to destroy an enemy at long range, as well as to bombard enemy land fortifications. The British sloops featured a battery of two 18 cm (7 in) and two 64 lb (29 kg) muzzle-loading rifles. The two 7-inch guns were centrally mounted on pivots, which gave them a wide arc of fire, while less mobile 64-pounder guns were mounted on each side of the ship.

=== Characteristics ===
The Royal Navy's 1864 construction program ordered three sloops built to this design: Amazon, Vestal, and Niobe. The following year's program ordered three more: Nymphe, Dryad, and Daphne. The class was designed by Edward Reed, and featured a length-to-beam ratio of 5 to 1 and a full hull form that only tapered at the extreme fore and aft. Due to timber shortages, shipyards had to source different kinds of wood, with teak, fir, and oak used throughout the class, though the exact types varied per ship. For instance, Amazon was built entirely of teak, while Daphne was framed with English oak and planked with Italian oak. Internal iron beams reinforced the hull structure, and the ships were the last all-wooden sloops in the Navy. The ships had a length of 56.99 m (187 ft), a beam of 10.97 m (36 ft), a draft of 4.69 m (15 ft), and barque rigging with a complement of 150 sailors. The displacement also varied: Amazon was the lightest at 1,525 long tons (1,549 metric tons), while Daphne was the heaviest at 1,640 long tons (1,670 metric tons). Compared to traditional British sloops, which used a sharp clipper bow to support the bowsprit, the Amazon class featured a cruiser stern and a ram-shaped bow. The primary purpose of this sharp bow was not to serve as a ram, but to provide additional buoyancy.

The ships carried several boats: a 8.2 m (27 ft)-long pinnace located amidships between the foremast and funnel, a 7.6 m (25 ft)-long steam cutter on the quarterdeck, two 7.6 m (25 ft) cutters behind the main mast, and a 4.9 m (16 ft) jolly boat astern. The machinery on each ship varied by builder and horsepower, but all were propelled by four boilers that fed steam at 30–32 pounds per square inch (210–220 kPa) to a horizontal single-expansion engine, which turned a 4.6 m (15 ft)-wide propeller. While under sail, the ships could reach 11 knots (20 km/h; 13 mph). However, only Nymphe was able to achieve the 13-knot goal under power, while the other five fell slightly short. In 1866, the Royal Navy planned to expand the class but was unsatisfied with the poor speed. The design was enlarged in an attempt to improve speed and lead to the seven Eclipse-class sloops. Plans to improve upon the Amazon-class design were soon abandoned, culminating with the Eclipse-class being larger and slower than the base design.

== Ships in class ==
Data
Name	Keel laid	Builder	Launched	Fate
Amazon	1864	Pembroke Dockyard	23 May 1865	Sunk 10 July 1866
Vestal	1864	Pembroke Dockyard	16 November 1865	Sold 1884
Niobe	1864	Devonport Dockyard	31 May 1866	Wrecked 21 May 1874
Dryad	1865	Devonport Dockyard	25 September 1866	Sold 1885
Daphne	1865	Pembroke Dockyard	23 October 1866	Sold 1882
Nymphe	1865	Devonport Dockyard	24 November 1865	Sold 1882

== Service history ==
Amazon was the first to be launched in 1865. After initial trials to measure the capabilities of the new class, she was assigned to the North America Station. On 9 July, the sloop was sailing to Bermuda when she collided with the steamship Osprey. Both ships sank, killing 12 on Osprey and one on Amazon. Niobe was launched in 1866 and primarily operated off North America, first to enforce British interests in the Caribbean, before being assigned to the fishery patrol off the Grand Banks of Newfoundland. On 21 May 1874, visibility and weather conditions were extremely poor, and she attempted to shelter behind Miquelon Island during a storm. The tide threw the ship against a set of rocks, wrecking the ship. The crew evacuated, although two died when one of the boats capsized.

Between the 1860s and 1880s, the Royal Navy stationed several ships to suppress the slave trade between East Africa and Arabian Peninsula. Dryad, Daphne, and Nymphe spent most of their early career as part of the mission, and the three ships shared £30,000 from captured dhows and freed slaves. In late 1868, Daphne was the most successful British anti-slave ship in the region when the rest of the squadron was preoccupied with the British expedition to Abyssinia. Daphne's tactics of loitering in different chokepoints based on the current season was adopted by Dryad and Nymphe who operated independently as part of their own squadron. This approach made them the most prolific anti-slave ships in the Navy at the time. In comparison, Vestal spent most of her uneventful service life in the East Indies.

In the early 1870s, the Royal Navy revamped its ordnance policy. As part of the reforms, Dryad, Nymphe, and Vestal were rearmed with nine 64 lb (29 kg) guns. Four were on the broadside while an additional gun was mounted on the bow. This gun could fire through three gun ports on the centerline or either side of the ship. In addition, one of the guns could be dragged to fire out of a rear gun port to serve as a stern gun. The rearmed ships had their complement increased to 170. The remaining four ships were decommissioned in the early 1880s due to their age and excessive wear.

== Sources ==
=== Print ===
- Ballard, G. A. (1938). "British Sloops of 1875: The Wooden Ram-Bowed Type". Mariner's Mirror. 24 (July). Cambridge, UK: Society for Nautical Research: 302–17.
- Broich, John (2017). Squadron: Ending the African Slave Trade. New York: Overlook Duckworth. ISBN 978-1-4683-1398-7.
- Conway's All the World's Fighting Ships, 1860-1905. New York: Mayflower Books. 1979. ISBN 978-0-8317-0302-8.
- Friedman, Norman (2012). British Cruisers of the Victorian Era. Annapolis, Maryland: Naval Institute Press. ISBN 978-1-59114-068-9.
- Lyon, David & Winfield, Rif (2004). The Sail and Steam Navy List: All the Ships of the Royal Navy 1815–1889. Chatham Publishing. ISBN 978-1-86176-032-6. OCLC 52620555.

=== Online ===
- "Supplying Warships · Liverpool's Abercromby Square and the Confederacy During the U.S. Civil War ·". ldhi.library.cofc.edu. Lowcountry Digital History Initiative. Archived from the original on July 19, 2024.
- Quarstein, John V. (2021-08-21). "Roll, Alabama, Roll! - Sinking of CSS Alabama". Mariners' Museum and Park. Archived from the original on June 23, 2024.
