= List of ship launches in 1866 =

The list of ship launches in 1866 includes a chronological list of some ships launched in 1866.

Date	Ship	Class	Builder	Location	Country	Notes
1 January	Bell Hill	Barque	Messrs. Chaffer, Bowldler & Co.	Seacombe	United Kingdom	For Messrs. J. B. Walmsley & Co.
1 January	Cape Clear	Merchantman	Messrs. T. Vernon & Sons	Liverpool	United Kingdom	For private owner.
1 January	Runnymede	Barque	William Doxford	Sunderland	United Kingdom	For Jackson & Co.
2 January	Huntley Castle	East Indiaman	Messrs. Charles Connell & Co.	Overnewton	United Kingdom	For Glasgow and Asiatic Shipping Co.
3 January	Achilles	East Indiaman	Messrs. T. Vernon & Sons	Seacombe	United Kingdom	For W. H. Dixon.
3 January	Britannia	Paddle steamer	Messrs. Barclay, Curle & Co.	Stobcross	United Kingdom	For Leith and Newcastle Steam Packet Co.
4 January	Estrella	Merchantman	Messrs. Hedderwick & Co.	Govan	United Kingdom	For Messrs. Doward, Dixon & Co.
4 January	Explorer	Merchantman	Messrs. R. & J. Evans	Liverpool	United Kingdom	For Messrs. T. H. Ismay & Co.
4 January	Santa Clara	Merchantman	Messrs. R. & J. Evans	Liverpool	United Kingdom	For Messrs. T. H. Ismay & Co.
6 January	The Maid of Mona	Schooner		Ayr	United Kingdom	For John Moore.
13 January	Murray	Paddle steamer	Messrs. Thomas Wingate & Co.	Whiteinch	United Kingdom	For Mr. Johnston.
14 January	Terentia	Barque	William Watson	Sunderland	United Kingdom	For Walton & Co.
16 January	City of Seringapatam	East Indiaman	Messrs. Barclay, Curle & Co.	Stobcross	United Kingdom	For Messrs. George Smith & Sons.
17 January	Talca	Barque	John Batchelor, or Batchelor Bros.	Cardiff	United Kingdom	For Cory Bros.
18 January	Iona	Steamship	Messrs. J. & G. Thompson	Govan	United Kingdom	For London and Edinburgh Shipping Co.
19 January	Carry On	Schooner	Messrs. G. C. Hutchinson & Co.	St. Lawrence-on-Tyne	United Kingdom	For Thomas Philp and Messrs. Charles West & Co.
19 January	Salado	Barque	Messrs. Kirkpatrick, M'Intyre & Co.	Port Glasgow	United Kingdom	For John. H. Carmichael.
20 January	Caledonia	Fishing smack	M'Lea	Rothesay	United Kingdom	For John Miller & Archibald Macvicar.
20 January	Guayre	Steamship	Messrs. Laird Bros.	Birkenhead	United Kingdom	For private owner.
20 January	Octavia	Steamship	Messrs. Blackwood & Gordon	Port Glasgow	United Kingdom	For Messrs. Blackwood & Gordon.
20 January	Whittington	Merchantman	Lune Ship Building Co.	Lancaster	United Kingdom	For Lancaster Ship Owners' Co.
31 January	Rakaia	Steamship	Messrs. Randolph, Elder & Co	Fairfield	United Kingdom	For Panama, New Zealand and Australian Royal Mail Co.
January	Octavia	Steamship	Messrs. Blackwood & Gordon	Port Glasgow	United Kingdom	For Messrs. Blackwood & Gordon.
1 February	Argyle	Steamship	Messrs. Barclay, Curle & Co.	Stobcross	United Kingdom	For private owner.
1 February	Ceres	Lighter	Messrs. Barclay, Curle & Co.	Stobcross	United Kingdom	For Leith, Hull & Hamburg Steam Packet Co.
1 February	Pallas	Lighter	Messrs. Barclay, Curle & Co.	Stobcross	United Kingdom	For Leith, Hull & Hamburg Steam Packet Co.
3 February	Fruit Girl	Merchantman	W. Read	Ipswich	United Kingdom	For Messrs. Love & Cundall.
3 February	Kenilworth	Barque	Preston Iron Ship Building Co.	Preston	United Kingdom	For Robert Hickson.
7 February	Ajax	Steamship	Messrs. Scott & Co.	Greenock	United Kingdom	For Messrs. Holt.
15 February	Edith	Schooner	Thomas Smith	Preston	United Kingdom	For Thomas Dawson.
15 February	Villa del Salto	Paddle steamer	Messrs. J. & G. Thompson	Govan	United Kingdom	For Nueva Compania Saltena.
16 February	Minero	Barque	Messrs. A. Stephen & Sons	Kelvinhaugh	United Kingdom	For James Hainsworth.
17 February	Gleniffer	Merchantman	Messrs. Barclay, Curle & Co.	Stobcross	United Kingdom	For Messrs. J. & A. Allen.
17 February	Matuara	Steamship	Millwall Iron Works and Shipbuilding Company	Millwall	United Kingdom	For Panama, New Zealand, and Australian Royal Mail Company.
19 February	Ardencaple	Paddle steamer	Messrs. R. Duncan & Co.	Port Glasgow	United Kingdom	For Glasgow and Helensburgh Steamboat Company.
19 February	Rio de Janeiro	Ironclad gunboat	Arsenal de Marinha do Corte	Rio de Janeiro	Brazil	For Imperial Brazilian Navy.
19 February	Rose Winans	Steam yacht	Hepworth	Isle of Dogs	United Kingdom	For William Lewis Winans.
19 February	Roseneath	Paddle steamer	Messrs. R. Duncan & Co.	Port Glasgow	United Kingdom	For Glasgow and Helensburgh Steamboat Company.
27 February	Cosmos	Steamship	Messrs. A. & J. Inglis	Pointhouse	United Kingdom	For private owner.
February	Goshawk	Schooner	Hansen	Cowes	United Kingdom	For private owner.
February	Kittiwake	Paddle steamer	Messrs. T. Wingate & Co.	Whiteinch	United Kingdom	For North British Railway.
February	Misero	Merchantman	Messrs. A. Stephens & Sons	Kelvinhaugh	United Kingdom	For Mr. Hainsworth.
1 March	Brinkburn	Barque	J. Davison	Sunderland	United Kingdom	For Colling & Co.
1 March	Eider	Paddle steamer	Gourlay Bros.	Dundee	United Kingdom	For General Steam Navigation Company.
1 March	Leander	Brig	John Smith	Abredeen	United Kingdom	For Mr. Henderson and others.
1 March	Weasel	Steamship	Messrs. J. & G. Thomson	Govan	United Kingdom	For Messrs. Burns.
2 March	Countess of Kintore	Clipper	William Duthie Jr.	Aberdeen	United Kingdom	For Shaw, Savill & Co.
3 March	Herald	Paddle steamer	Messrs. Caird & Co.	Greenock	United Kingdom	For Glasgow, Greenock & Campbeltown Line.
3 March	Northampton	East Indiaman	Messrs. Charles Connell & Co.	Overnewton	United Kingdom	For Messrs. John Lidgett & Sons.
5 March	Balkamah	East Indiaman	Humber Iron Works and Ship Building Company (Limited)	Hull	United Kingdom	For Edward Bates.
7 March	Lord Aberdour	Paddle steamer	Messrs. Aitken & Manell	Whiteinch	United Kingdom	For Donald. R. Macgregor.
8 March	Thomas Roys	Whaler	Messrs. A. Stephen & Sons	Kelvinhaugh	United Kingdom	For private owner.
13 March	Charrua	Steamship	London and Glasgow Engineering and Iron Shipbuilding Co.	Glasgow	United Kingdom	For Compañia Oriental de Navigacion á Vapor.
13 March	Guaycuru	Steamship	London and Glasgow Engineering and Iron Shipbuilding Co.	Glasgow	United Kingdom	For Compañia Oriental de Navigacion á Vapor.
15 March	City of Vienna	East Indiaman	Messrs. Charles Connell & Co.	Overnewton	United Kingdom	For Messrs. George Smith & Sons.
17 March	Panama	Paddle steamer	Messrs. Randolph, Elder & Co.	Govan	United Kingdom	For Pacific Steam Navigation Company.
17 March	Surat	Steamship	Messrs. C. A. Day & Co.	Southampton	United Kingdom	For Peninsular and Oriental Steam Navigation Company.
17 March	Tynwald	Steamship	Messrs. Caird & Co.	Greenock	United Kingdom	For Isle of Man Steam Packet Company.
20 March	Levan	Steamship	Messrs. Kirkpatrick, M'Intyre & Co.	Port Glasgow	United Kingdom	For Greenock and Helensburgh Steamboat Company (Limited).
20 March	Salisbury	Clipper	Portland Shipbuilding Co.	Troon	United Kingdom	For Merchant Shipping Co.
20 March	Sylvia	Gunvessel		Woolwich Dockyard	United Kingdom	For Royal Navy.
21 March	Miranda	Steamship	Messrs. C. & W. Earle	Hull	United Kingdom	For George Lawson.
22 March	North Star	Steamship	Messrs. Henderson, Coulborn & Co.	Renfrew	United Kingdom	For H. L. Seligmann.
22 March	Selimié	Frigate		Constantinople	Ottoman Empire	For Ottoman Navy.
27 March	Meg Merrilies	Paddle steamer	Messrs. A. & J. Inglis	Pointhouse	United Kingdom	For private owner.
29 March	Dunborve	Schooner	Robert S. Ferguson	Port Dundas	United Kingdom	For Messrs. A. & K. Macdonald.
29 March	Reindeer	Camelion-class sloop		Chatham Dockyard	United Kingdom	For Royal Navy.
31 March	Avoca	Steamship	Messrs. W. Denny & Bros.	Dumbarton	United Kingdom	For Peninsular and Oriental Steam Navigation Company.
31 March	Brunette	Yawl	Messrs. Camper & Nicholson	Gosport	United Kingdom	For N. Watney.
31 March	Earl of Belfast	Steamship	Messrs. Randolph, Elder & Co.	Glasgow	United Kingdom	For Ardrossn and Belfast Line.
31 March	Flora	Cutter	Robinson	Gosport	United Kingdom	For HM Coastguard.
31 March	Omound	Smack	Messrs. Smith, Stephenson & Co	Grimsby	United Kingdom	For H. Smethurst.
31 March	Quinnebaug	Sloop-of-war		New York Navy Yard	United States	For United States Navy.
March	Elwy	Paddle steamer	Messrs. Thomas B. Sneath & Co.	Rutherglen	United Kingdom	For R. W. Preston.
March	Ferry Queen	Brig	Robert Allen & Son.	Pembroke	United Kingdom	For William Allen.
2 April	Andrade	Steamship	Messrs. Aitken & Mansel	Whiteinch	United Kingdom	For Angola Company (Limited).
3 April	Belette	Belette-class flotilla craft (schooner)	Arsenal de Rochefort	Rochefort	France	For French Navy
3 April	Levrette	Belette-class flotilla craft (schooner)	Arsenal de Rochefort	Rochefort	France	For French Navy
3 April	Ceylon	Brig	James Robinson	Sunderland	United Kingdom	For Messrs. John H. Berry & Co.
3 April	Susan	Cutter	Messrs. Camper & Nicholson	Gosport	United Kingdom	For Lord Hardwicke.
3 April	Wallace	Schooner	Messrs. Carnegie & Matthew	Peterhead	United Kingdom	For private owners.
4 April	Bristol	Paddle steamer	William H. Webb	New York	United States	For Narragansett Steamship Company.
11 April	Camel	Paddle steamer	Messrs. Caird & Co.	Greenock	United Kingdom	For Messrs. Burns.
11 April	Dandie Dinmont	Paddle steamer	Messrs. A. & J. Inglis	Glasgow	United Kingdom	For private owner.
12 April	Chevalier	Paddle steamer	Messrs. J. & G. Thomson	Govan	United Kingdom	For Messrs. D. Hutcheson & Co.
14 April	City of Cork	Paddle steamer	Messrs. Robinson & Co.	Cork	United Kingdom	For Citizens' River Steamers Co.
14 April	Clyde of Padstow	Smack	Messrs. Charles Connell & Co.	Overnewton	United Kingdom	For Messrs. A. & D. Mackay.
14 April	Dorothy Thompson	Barque	William Doxford	Sunderland	United Kingdom	For Mr. Tully.
14 April	Elizabeth Mary	Barque	William Watson	Sunderland	United Kingdom	For Duncan & Co.
14 April	Esmerelda	Barque	Messrs. Vernon & Son	Seacombe	United Kingdom	For Mr. Lowe and others.
14 April	Murillo	Steamship	Messrs. Randolph, Elder & Co.	Fairfield	United Kingdom	For private owner.
14 April	Sylhet	Merchantman	Messrs. R. & J. Evans & Co.	Liverpool	United Kingdom	For Mr. Davies and others.
16 April	Ardgowan	Paddle steamer	Messrs. L. Hill & Co.	Port Glasgow	United Kingdom	For Greenock & Helensburgh Co.
16 April	Breadalbane	Schooner	Messrs. J. & R. Swan	Kelvindock	United Kingdom	For Messrs M'Caul.
16 April	Rebecca	Brig	Evans	Morben	United Kingdom	For private owner.
17 April	Jachta	Paddle steamer	Preston Iron Ship Building Company	Preston	United Kingdom	For Messrs. J. H. Forester & Co.
17 April	Marpesia	Clipper		Port Glasgow	United Kingdom	For Messrs. Thompson, May & Co, or Messrs. Joseph Heap & Sons.
17 April	Northumberland	Minotaur-class ironclad	Millwall Iron Works	Millwall	United Kingdom	For Royal Navy.
17 April	Pride of Mistley	Merchantman	W. Read	Ipswich	United Kingdom	For private owner.
17 April	Sobraon	Steamship	Alexander Hall & Co.	Aberdeen	United Kingdom	For Shaw, Lowther, Maxton & Co.
17 April	Taurus	Paddle steamer	Preston Iron Ship Building Company	Preston, Lancashire	United Kingdom	For General Steam Navigation Company.
18 April	Jacinth	Steamship	Messrs. Kirkpatrick & M'Intyre	Port Glasgow	United Kingdom	For Glasgow and Liverpool Carrying Company.
18 April	Minnie	Cutter	Messrs. R. & M. Ratsey	Cowes	United Kingdom	For Ralph Dawson.
18 April	Princess	Paddle steamer	Seath	Rutherglen	United Kingdom	For private owner.
18 April	Scotia	Steamship	Messrs. Aitken & Mansell	Whiteinch	United Kingdom	For Glasgow & Newcastle Shipping Co.
19 April	Lion	Steamship	Messrs. Robert Steele & Son	Greenock	United Kingdom	For Walter Grieve. Lion collided with the steamship Albion on being launched.
19 April	Princess Alice	Steamship	Messrs. Tod & MacGregor	Partick	United Kingdom	For Messrs. M. Langlands & Sons.
19 April	Saint-Laurent	Ocean liner	Chantiers Scott	Saint-Nazaire	France	For Compagnie Générale Transatlantique.
20 April	Condor	Cutter	Messrs. Robert Steele & Son	Greenock	United Kingdom	For William Houldsworth.
21 April	The Calderbank	Barque	Messrs. Fullarton	Ayr	United Kingdom	For private owner.
24 April	Stinchar	Clipper	F. Robertson	Peterhead	United Kingdom	For Arrow Line.
28 April	Zurbaran	Steamship	Messrs. Randolph, Elder & Co.	Fairfield	United Kingdom	For private owner.
30 April	Brazilian	Brig		Saint John	(United Kingdom of Great Britain and Ireland) Colony of New Brunswick	For private owner.
30 April	West of England	Steamship	Messrs. Bowdler, Chaffer & Co.	Seacombe	United Kingdom	For London and Liverpool Steamship Co.
April	Achilles	Steamship		River Clyde	United Kingdom	For private owner.
April	Brazilian	Brig		Saint John	(United Kingdom of Great Britain and Ireland) Colony of New Brunswick	For private owner.
April	Iron Queen	Full-rigged ship	Spittle	Newport	United Kingdom	For private owner.
April	M. A. Dixon	Barque	Andrews	Seacombe	United Kingdom	For John McDiarmid.
April	May	Full-rigged ship	Messrs. T. M. & R. J. Jenkins	Saint John	(United Kingdom of Great Britain and Ireland) Colony of New Brunswick	For private owner.
April	Princess of Wales	Paddle steamer		River Clyde	United Kingdom	For private owner.
25 April	Isère	Moselle-class transport	Arsenal de Lorient	Lorient	France	For French Navy.
1 May	Candahar	Sailing ship	Harland & Wolff	Belfast	United Kingdom	For T. & J. Brocklebank.
2 May	County of Bute	Merchantman	Messrs. Charles Connell & Co.	Overnewton	United Kingdom	For Messrs. R. & J. Craig.
2 May	Flechers	Clipper	Messrs. Thomas Vernon & Son	Liverpool	United Kingdom	For private owner.
2 May	Palmerston	Paddle steamer	Messrs. T. Wingate & Co.	Whiteinch	United Kingdom	For Messrs. Brown.
4 May	Osaca	Steamship	Messrs. A. Stephen & Sons	Kelvinhaugh	United Kingdom	For Messrs. James Howden & Co.
4 May	Theban	Steamship	Messrs. Duncan & Co.	Port Glasgow	United Kingdom	For Robert Little.
10 May	Victoria	Steamship	Messrs. J. & R . Swan	Kelvinhaugh	United Kingdom	For James Hay.
12 May	Ludworth	Steamship	Messrs. Thomas Wingate & Co.	Whiteinch	United Kingdom	For London Steam Colliery & Coal Co. (Limited).
14 May	Collingwood	Steamship	Messrs. J. Wigham Richardson & Co.	Low Walker	United Kingdom	For Shields Steam Shipping Co.
15 May	Albert Victor	Steamship	Messrs. Aitken & Mansel	Whiteinch	United Kingdom	For London and Margate Saloon Steam Packet Company.
15 May	City of St. Asaph	Barquentine	Robert Jones	Voryd	United Kingdom	For Mr. Williams and others.
15 May	Kathleen	Steamship	A. Denny	Glasgow	United Kingdom	For private owner.
Unknown date	La Riposta	Paddle steamer	John Batchelor, or Batchelor Bros.	Cardiff	United Kingdom	For private owner.
16 May	Belpore	Merchantman	Messrs. Barclay, Curle & Co	Whiteinch	United Kingdom	For Messrs. Eyre, Evans & Co.
16 May	Labrador	Steamship	William Watson	Sunderland	United Kingdom	For Hudson's Bay Company.
16 May	Maria Rickard	Lugger	M. Scallan	Ringsend	United Kingdom	For Stephen Rickard.
16 May	Olga	Paddle steamer	Messrs. Malcolmson Bros.	Waterford	United Kingdom	For London, Havre and New York Line.
17 May	Durham	Snow	Robert Potts	Seaham	United Kingdom	For Stavers & Co.
18 May	John Rogers	Fishing vessel	M'Cann	Hull	United Kingdom	For Daniel Grimwood.
18 May	Vesper	Paddle steamer	Messrs. Barclay, Curle & Co.	Whiteinch	United Kingdom	For Messrs. Campbell.
19 May	Gleam	Cutter			United Kingdom	For Mr. Mollett.
24 May	Garonne	Steamship	Messrs. C. & W. Earle	Hull	United Kingdom	For Messrs. Moss & Co.
26 May	Snipe	Steamship	Messrs. Thomson	Govan	United Kingdom	For Messrs. Burns & M'Iver.
29 May	Deutschland	Steamship	Messrs. Caird & Co.	Greenock	United Kingdom	For Norddeutscher Lloyd.
29 May	Hendon	Brig	J. & E. Lumsden	Sunderland	United Kingdom	For John Crossby and associates.
31 May	Hilda	Steamship	James Laing	Sunderland	United Kingdom	For Thomas & Harrowing.
31 May	Niobe	Dispatch vessel		Deptford Dockyard	United Kingdom	For Royal Navy.
May	Adeline	Cutter	Fyfe	Fairlie	United Kingdom	For T. E. Reid.
May	Campeador	Steamship	Messrs. Randolph, Elder & Co	Govan	United Kingdom	For Messrs. M'Andred & Co.
May	Condor	Cutter	Messrs. Steele & Sons	Greenock	United Kingdom	For Mr. Houldsworth.
May	Ellida	Cutter	Fyfe	Fairlie	United Kingdom	For G. E. Duck.
May	Jessie Forrest	Schooner	Bowdler, Chaffer & Co.	Seacombe	United Kingdom	For Jacob Forrest.
May	William Cass	Schooner	John Banks	Kilpin Pike	United Kingdom	For William Cass.
May	Parramatta	Full-rigged ship	James Laing	Sunderland	United Kingdom	For Devitt and Moore.
1 June	Apollo	Steamship	Messrs. William Denny & Bros.	Dumbarton	United Kingdom	For Öesterreichische Lloyd.
1 June	Tirfing	John Ericsson-class monitor	Motala Verkstad	Norrköping	Sweden	For Royal Swedish Navy.
4 June	Janet Cowan	Steamship	Messrs. Steel & Co.	Greenock	United Kingdom	For Messrs. R. Shankland & Co.
4 June	Staverton	Merchantman	Messrs. J. C. Buckle & Co	Bristol	United Kingdom	For Messrs. J. & S. W. Olive.
6 June	Rothay	Steamboat		Newby Bridge	United Kingdom	For private owner.
8 June	Mitero	Schooner	Messrs. Alexander Stephen & Sons	Kelvinhaugh	United Kingdom	For J. Hainsworth.
11 June	Piscataqua	Steamship		Portsmouth Navy Yard	United States	For United States Navy.
12 June	Vine	Steamship	Messrs. C. & W. Earle	Hull	United Kingdom	For Messrs. Bailey & Leatham.
14 June	River Clyde	Barque	Messrs. Hedderwick & Co.	Govan	United Kingdom	For Messrs. Hargrove, Ferguson & Co.
14 June	William Davie	Merchantman	Messrs. Alexander Stephen & Sons	Kelvinhaugh	United Kingdom	For Albion Shipping Co.
16 June	Oriente	Clipper	Messrs. Thomas Vernon & Son	Seacomber	United Kingdom	For Messrs. Nicholson & M'Gill.
28 June	Hyacinth	Yawl	Messrs. Camper & Nicholson	Cowes	United Kingdom	For Colonel Martyn.
28 June	Providence	Sternwheeler	William H. Webb	New York	United States	For Fall River Line.
28 June	Sussex	Merchantman	Messrs. Barclay, Curle & Co.	Stobcross	United Kingdom	For George Marshall, hired by Royal Navy.
28 June	Waterwitch	Gunboat	Thames Ironworks and Shipbuilding Company	Millwall	United Kingdom	For Royal Navy.
June	Arkansas	Barque	T. Metcalf	Sunderland	United Kingdom	For George Watson.
June	Citta di Napoli	Transport ship		Gena	Italy	For Regia Marina.
June	Dauntless	Schooner	Forsyth & Morgan	Mystic Bridge, Connecticut	United States	For S. Dexter Bradford and James Gordon Bennett Jr.
June	Florence	Steamship	Messrs. Bainbridge, Davy & Hopper	River Tyne	United Kingdom	For E. T. Gourley.
2 July	Netley	Britomart-class gunboat		Haslar	United Kingdom	For Royal Navy.
4 July	Colon	Steamship	Messrs. Randolph, Elder & Co.	Fairfield	United Kingdom	For Messrs. M'Andrew & Co.
4 July	Dagmar	Steamship	Messrs. C. & W. Earle	Hull	United Kingdom	For Messrs. W. N. Smith & Co.
7 July	Penrith	Merchantman	Messrs. A. Millan & Sons	Dumbarton	United Kingdom	For Peter Iredale.
13 July	Windsor	Steamship	Messrs. Blackwppd & Gordon	Port Glasgow	United Kingdom	For Messrs. Gibson, and D. R. M'Gregor.
14 July	St. Vincent	Steamship	John Batchelor, or Batchelor Bros.	Cardiff	United Kingdom	For James Ware.
14 July	Thrascian	Steamship	Messrs. Duncan & Co.	Port Glasgow	United Kingdom	For private owner.
9 July	Miranda	Yawl	Messrs. Camper & Nicholson	Gosport	United Kingdom	For Colonel Martyn.
12 July	Anglo-Dane	Steamship	Messrs. A. Leslie & Co.	Hebburn	United Kingdom	For Danish and Baltic Steam Navigation Company (limited).
14 July	Cordillera	Clipper	Messrs. Thomas Vernon & Son	Seacombe	United Kingdom	For Messrs. W. J. Myers, Son, & Co.
28 July	British Flag	Clipper	Messrs. Thomas Vernon & Son	Seacombe	United Kingdom	For British Shipowners' Co.
28 July	Bulboa	Steamship	Messrs. Randolph, Elder & Co.	Fairfield	United Kingdom	For Messrs. M'Andrew & Co.
28 July	Columbine	Steamship	Messrs. J. Wigham Richardson & Co.	Low Walker	United Kingdom	For Messrs. Lofthouse, Glover & Co.
28 July	Needle Gun	Steamship	Messrs. T. R. Oswald & Co.	Pallion	United Kingdom	For E. T. Gourlay.
28 July	Sherburn	Collier	James Laing	Sunderland	United Kingdom	For H. Morton.
31 July	Defiance	Fishing smack	Messrs. Johnson & Wood	Hull	United Kingdom	For Mr. Ansell.
July	Analyst	Barque	W. S. Cale	Kouchibouguac	(United Kingdom of Great Britain and Ireland) Colony of New Brunswick	For private owner.
July	Beatrice	Schooner	Hansen	Cowes	United Kingdom	For private owner.
Unknown date	Eliza Annie	Schooner	Joseph & Nicholas Butson	Bodinnick or Polruan	United Kingdom	For W. W. Dingle.
July	Schleswig Bride	Full-rigged ship	William Muirhead	Miramichi	(United Kingdom of Great Britain and Ireland) Colony of New Brunswick	For private owner.
1 August	Ceylon	Merchantman	Messrs. A. M'Millan & Sons	Dumbarton	United Kingdom	For John Kerr.
1 August	Diana	Steamship	Messrs. William Denny & Bros.	Dumbarton	United Kingdom	For Österreichischer Lloyd.
1 August	Perseverance	Fishing smack	Messrs. McCann	Hull	United Kingdom	For Samuel Edwards.
9 August	Colchagua	Barque	Bowdler, Chaffer & Co.	Seacombe	United Kingdom	For Joseph Steel & Son.
10 August	Antiope	Clipper	Messrs. John Reid & Co.	Port Glasgow	United Kingdom	For Messrs. Joseph Heap & Sons.
10 August	Palmerston	Paddle tug	George Butchard	Gravesend	United Kingdom	For Telegraph Towing Co.
10 August	Vanguard	Steamship	W. Simons & Co.	Renfrew	United Kingdom	For private owner.
11 August	Australian	Clipper	Messrs. John Duthie, Sons, & Co.	Aberdeen	United Kingdom	For private owners.
11 August	Columbian	Steamship	Messrs. Pile, Spence & Co.	West Hartlepool	United Kingdom	For West India and Pacific Steamhip Co.
11 August	Dallam Tower	Merchantman	Messrs. Clover & Co.	Birkenhead	United Kingdom	For Lancaster Shipowners Co.
11 August	Dublin	Steamship	Messrs. Walpole, Webb & Bewley	Dublin	United Kingdom	For United Kingdom Screw Colliery Company.
11 August	Idaho	Steamship	George F. & John Patten	Bath, Maine	United States	For Anchor Line.
13 August	Isolata	Barque	Mr. Thomas	Nevin	United Kingdom	For private owner.
13 August	The Result	Fishing smack	Messrs. Hunt	Slaughden	United Kingdom	For H. Bedwell.
14 August	Hopeful	Barque	Messrs. Kirkpatrick, M'Intyre & Co.	Port Glasgow	United Kingdom	For Henry T. Stanes.
14 August	Ibis	Steam yacht	Messrs. Tod & M'Gregor	Partick	United Kingdom	For F. C. T. Gasgoine.
14 August	Minerva	Barque	Robert Pace	Sunderland	United Kingdom	For Messrs. Kirkwood & Taylorson.
15 August	Cariddé	Steamship	Messrs. M'Nab & Co.	Greenock	United Kingdom	For Messrs. J. & V. Fiorio & Co.
15 August	James Rankine	Steamship	Messrs. Laurence Hill & Co.	Port Glasgow	United Kingdom	For private owner.
15 August	Lion	Steam Keel	Messrs. E. & W. Earle	Hull	United Kingdom	For W. Thompson.
18 August	Cortes	Steamship	Messrs. Randolph, Elder & Co.	Govan	United Kingdom	For Messrs. M'Andrew & Co.
21 August	The Swan	Steamship	Messrs. J. & R. Swan	Kelvin Dock	United Kingdom	For L. Stewart.
25 August	Worcester	Sloop-of-war		Boston Navy Yard	United States	For United States Navy.
27 August	Christiania Thompson	Clipper	Messrs. Walter Hood & Co.	Aberdeen	United Kingdom	For Messrs. George Thompson Jr., & Co.
27 August	Robert Jones	Barque	Messrs. Owen & Roberts	Portinllaen	United Kingdom	For private owner.
28 August	Lady Alice Hill	Steamship	Messrs. Richardson, Denton, Duck & Co.	Middleton	United Kingdom	For private owner.
28 August	Sutherland	Steamship	Messrs. Barclay, Curle & Co	Whiteinch	United Kingdom	For Messrs. John Warrack & Co.
29 August	Lady Ida Duff	Merchantman	Messrs. J. & W. Geddie	Banff	United Kingdom	For private owner. Capsized on being launched.
30 August	Tenasserim	Sailing ship	Harland & Wolff	Belfast	United Kingdom	For T. & J. Brocklebank.
August	Courier	Schooner	Hempstead Barnes	Gloucester	United Kingdom	For J. & A. Sutherland.
August	Diana	Steamship	Messrs. W. Denny & Bros.	Dumbarton	United Kingdom	For Österreichischer Lloyd.
August	Speedaway	Barque	William Muirhead	Miramichi	(United Kingdom of Great Britain and Ireland) Colony of New Brunswick	For private owner.
1 September	Cormoran	Steamship	Messrs. Randolph, Elder & co	Govan	United Kingdom	For Ocean Fishery Co.
1 September	Heron	Steamship	Messrs. Randolph, Elder & co	Govan	United Kingdom	For Ocean Fishery Co.
6 September	Unnamed	Steamship	Messrs. Scott & Co.	Greenock	United Kingdom	For Messrs. Scott & Co.
8 September	Superb	East Indiaman	Messrs. Green	Blackwall	United Kingdom	For private owner.
10 September	Columbia	Steamship	Messrs. A. Stephen & Sons	Kelvinhaugh	United Kingdom	For Messrs. Handysides & Henderson.
11 September	Nestorian	Steamship	Messrs. Barclay, Curle & Co.	Whiteinch	United Kingdom	For Messrs. J. & A. Allen.
12 September	Mary Louise	Schooner	Messrs. Upham & Son	Brixham	United Kingdom	For Messrs. J. Bovey & Co.
12 September	Verdin	Steamship	Messrs. W. Simons & Co.	Renfrew	United Kingdom	For Messrs. Joseph Verdin & Sons.
15 September	Malvina	Steamship	Messrs. J. & G. Thomson	Govan	United Kingdom	For London and Edinburgh Shipping Co.
17 September	Pizarro	Steamship	Messrs. Randolph, Elder & Co.	Govan	United Kingdom	For Messrs. M'Andrew & Co.
24 September	Jumna	Euphrates-class troopship	Palmers Shipbuilding and Iron Company	Hebburn	United Kingdom	For Royal Navy.
24 September	St. Abb's	Coaster	Messrs. J. & J. Fyfe	Fairlie	United Kingdom	For Messrs. Daniel Cormack and Messrs. J. & J. Rae.
25 September	Amelia	Schooner	B. F. G. Meldrum	Bo'ness	United Kingdom	For B. F. G. Meldrum and Mr. Marshall.
25 September	Dryad	Amazon-class sloop		Devonport Dockyard	United Kingdom	For Royal Navy.
25 September	Sancho	Brig	Reay & Naisby	Hylton	United Kingdom	For Lawson & Co.
26 September	I. O. U.	Schooner	John Lambert	Ipswich	United Kingdom	For E. Johnson.
26 September	Serapis	Euphrates-class troopship	Thames Shipbuilding Co.	Leamouth	United Kingdom	For Royal Navy.
27 September	Gryfe	East Indiaman	Messrs. R. Steele & Co.	Cartsdyke	United Kingdom	For Mr. Russell.
27 September	Mary Jane	Schooner	William Allsup	Preston	United Kingdom	For Lamb & Co.
29 September	Don Guillermo	Barque	Messrs. R. & J. Evans & Co.	Liverpool	United Kingdom	For Arthur M. Robinson and others.
September	Aline	Steamship		River Clyde	United Kingdom	For E. F. Sichel.
September	Count Bismarck	Merchantman		Großefehn	Kingdom of Hanover	For private owner.
September	Fitzwilliam	Steamship	Messrs. J. & R. Swan	Kelvin Dock	United Kingdom	For Messrs. Burrell & M'Laren.
September	Flora	Merchantman	J. & E. Lumsden	Pallion	United Kingdom	For G. Sinclair.
September	Jason	Steamship	Messrs. A. & J. Inglis	Pointhouse	United Kingdom	For Koninklijke Nederlands Stoomboot-Maatschappij.
September	Morning Star	Missionary ship		Boston, Massachusetts	United States	For private owner.
September	Pandora	Merchantman	Charles M'Grory	Killybegs	United Kingdom	For Mr. Blain.
September	Surprise	Tender		River Clyde	United Kingdom	For private owner.
September	Sutherland	Steamship	Messrs. Barclay, Curle & Co.	Stobcross	United Kingdom	For Messrs. J. Warrack & Co.
7 October	Francis Perkins	Schooner	Henry Steers	Greenpoint, New York	United States	For New York Pilots' Association.
7 October	Pirapama	Merchantman	Preston Iron Ship Building Company	Preston	United Kingdom	For private owner.
8 October	Pareora	Steamship	Messrs. R. Duncan & Co.	Port Glasgow	United Kingdom	For Messrs. Potter, Wilson & Co.
9 October	Prins Hendrik der Nederlanden	Ironclad ramtorenschip	Messrs. Laird & Sons	Birkenhead	United Kingdom	For Royal Netherlands Navy.
9 October	The Bruce	Full-rigged ship	Aitken & Mansel	Glasgow	United Kingdom	For British Shipowners Company.
11 October	Helen Macgregor	Steamship	Messrs. T. Wingate & Col	Whiteinch	United Kingdom	For Charles V. Robinson.
18 October	Alvarade	Sreamship	Messrs. Randolph, Elder & Co.	Fairfield	United Kingdom	For Messrs. M'Andrew & Co.
23 October	Daphne	Amazon-class sloop		Pembroke Dockyard	United Kingdom	For Royal Navy.
24 October	Granton	Steamship	Messrs. Gourlay Bros. & Co.	Dundee	United Kingdom	For General Steam Navigation Company.
24 October	Lucy Bazley	Schooner	William Allsup	Preston	United Kingdom	For Thomas Dawson.
24 October	River Queen	Fishing smack	Messrs. T. Campbell & Co.	Great Grimsby	United Kingdom	For J. Westcote.
24 October	Rover's Bride	Fishing smack	Westaway	Lowestoft	United Kingdom	For William Rose.
24 October	Wemyss Castle	Merchantman	Messrs. Charles Connell & Co.	Overnewton	United Kingdom	For Castle Line.
25 October	The Foundling	Full-rigged ship	Humber Iron Works & Shipbuilding Co.	Hull	United Kingdom	For Edward Bates.
25 October	Kangaroo	Fishing smack	John Dalton	Great Grimsby	United Kingdom	For Messrs. Cassell & Co.
25 October	Richard Cobden	Fishing smack	Messrs. Dodds & Co	Great Grimsby	United Kingdom	For W. W. Dawson.
25 October	The Underley	Merchantman	Lune Ship Building Co	Lancaster	United Kingdom	For Lancaster Shipowners' Co.
25 October	William John	Fishing smack	Hugh Singleton	Fleetwood	United Kingdom	For Messrs. Summer & Co.
26 October	Salto	Steamship	Messrs. J. & G. Thomson	Govan	United Kingdom	For Compagnia Uruguay.
27 October	Elmstone	Composite Barque	G.S. Moore & Co	Sunderland	United Kingdom	
27 October	Lindsay	Steamship	Messrs. Bowdler, Chaffer & Co.	Seacombe	United Kingdom	For Wigan Coal & Iron Co.
27 October	River Avon	Barque	Messrs. Kirkpatrick, M'Intyre & Co.	Port Glasgow	United Kingdom	For Messrs. Hargrove, Ferguson & Co.
October	Britomast	Merchantman	Messrs. John Reid & Co.	Port Glasgow	United Kingdom	For Henry Bowring.
October	Chicago	Steamship	Messrs. C. M. Palmer & Co. (limiter)	Jarrow	United Kingdom	For Liverpool and Great Western Steam Shipping Co.
October	Cydonia	Snow	W. H. Pearson	Sunderland	United Kingdom	For Robert Fairley.
October	Emmaus	Schooner	Crinson	Hylton	United Kingdom	For J. Humphrey.
October	Fiona	Barque	Messrs. Dunn & Samson	Quebec	(United Kingdom of Great Britain and Ireland) Province of Canada	For private owner.
October	Sutosa	Steamship	Messrs. Randolph, Elder & Co.	Fairfield	United Kingdom	For British India Steam Navigation Company.
October	Union	Steamship	Messrs. Caird & Co.	Greenock	United Kingdom	For Norddeutsche Lloyd.
October	Zuleika	Brigantine			(United Kingdom of Great Britain and Ireland) Unknown	For Private owner.
2 November	Cumberland	Steamship	Messrs. Barclay, Curle & Co.	Stobcross	United Kingdom	For Liverpool and Hamburg Steam Co.
5 November	Diamond	Tug	Messrs. Barclay, Curle & Co.	Whiteinch	United Kingdom	For River Towing Co.
8 November	City of Antwerp	Steamship	Messrs. Tod & MacGregor	Partick	United Kingdom	For Inman Line.
8 November	Great Republic	Paddle steamer	Henry Steers	Greenpoint, New York	United States	For Pacific Mail Steamship Company.
8 November	Acadia	Steamship	Messrs. Alexander Stephen & Sons	Kelvinhaugh, Glasgow	United Kingdom	For Messrs. Handyside & Henderson.
8 November	Golden Sheaf	Brig	Messrs. David Burns & Co.	Aberdeen	United Kingdom	For Herman Ganson.
8 November	Helen Denny	Clipper	Messrs. Robert Duncan & Co.	Port Glasgow	United Kingdom	For Messrs. Partrick Henderson & Co.
8 November	Scanderia	Steamship	London and Glasgow Engineering and Shipbuilding Company (Limited)	Glasgow	United Kingdom	For Anglo-Egyptioan Navigation Company (Limited).
20 November	Le Colon	Steamship	Messrs. Dobie & Co.	Govan	United Kingdom	For Compagnie Anonyme de Navigation Mixte de Marseille.
24 November	Charles Howard	Steamship	W. Pile	Sunderland	United Kingdom	For Ryde & Co.
24 November	Earl of Dublin	Paddle steamer	Messrs. Robert Duncan & Co.	Port Glasgow	United Kingdom	For Dublin & Glasgow Steampacket Co.
24 November	Euphrates	Euphrates-class troopship	Messrs. Laird Bros.	Birkenhead	United Kingdom	For Royal Navy.
24 November	Nymphe	Amazon-class sloop		Deptford Dockyard	United Kingdom	For Royal Navy.
27 November	Paquete de Maule	Steamship	Mackern	Preston	United Kingdom	For Messrs. Graham, Rowe & Co.
November	Astarte	Barque			United Kingdom	For private owner.
November	Bolivar No. 2	Steamship	Messrs. Richardson, Duck & Co.	Stockton-on-Tees	United Kingdom	For Bolivian Government.
November	Cairo	Steamship	Messrs. W. Denny & Bros.	Dumbarton	United Kingdom	For private owner.
November	Quinteros	Barque	William Watson	Sunderland	United Kingdom	For J. Beynon.
6 December	Nimrod	Whaler	Alexander Stephen and Sons	Dundee	United Kingdom	For Thomas Job.
7 December	Minia	Steamship	London and Glasgow Engineering and Iron Shipbuilding Company (Limited)	Glasgow	United Kingdom	For private owner.
9 December	Celestial Empire	Steamship		New York	United States	For Pacific Mail Steamship Company.
8 December	Hammonia	Steamship	Messrs. Caird & Co.	Greenock	United Kingdom	For Hamburg-Amerikanische Packetfahrt-Aktien-Gesellschaft.
8 December	Malabar	Euphrates-class troopship	Thames Shipbuilding Co.	Leamouth	United Kingdom	For Royal Navy.
December	Excelsior	Merchantman	Mr. Bishton	Chester	United Kingdom	For Henry Craven.
December	Ontario	Steamship		Newburyport, Massachusetts	United States	For American Steamship Co.
Unknown date	Adelaide	Paddle steamer		Echuca	(United Kingdom of Great Britain and Ireland) Victoria	For J. C. Grassey & partners.
Unknown date	Agatha	Merchantman	Mills	Sunderland	United Kingdom	For Hankey & Co.
Unknown date	Aldebaran	Barque	Robert Thompson Jr.	Sunderland	United Kingdom	For Penney & Co.
Unknown date	Alice Scott	Merchantman	William Doxford	Sunderland	United Kingdom	For D. C. Scott.
Unknown date	Alpena	Paddle steamer	Thomas Arnold of Gallagher & Company	Marine City, Michigan	United States	For Gardner, Ward & Gallagher.
Unknown date	Alswold	Brig	Gibbon & Nichol	Sunderland	United Kingdom	For Bennett & Co.
Unknown date	Anglia	Paddle tug			United Kingdom	For William Watkins Ltd.
Unknown date	Amadine	Barque	Robert Thompson Jr.	Sunderland	United Kingdom	For M. Atkinson.
Unknown date	Ancestor	Barque	Robert Thompson Jr.	Sunderland	United Kingdom	For Culliford & Co.
Unknown date	Ancient Promise	Merchantman	J. Barkes	Sunderland	United Kingdom	For Alder & Co.
Unknown date	Annie	Schooner	John Barter	Brixham	United Kingdom	For William Varwell Jr. and others.
Unknown date	Annie Scott	Brigantine	William Scott	Sunderland	United Kingdom	For D. C. Scott.
Unknown date	Apollo	Full-rigged ship	G. Peverall	Sunderland	United Kingdom	For John Evans.
Unknown date	Arabella	Merchantman	B. Hodgson	Sunderland	United Kingdom	For Hick & Co.
Unknown date	Araunah	Barque	Gardner	Sunderland	United Kingdom	For T. B. Walker.
Unknown date	Argonaut	Full-rigged ship	Thomas Bilbe & Co.	Rotherhithe	United Kingdom	For Thomas Bilbe & Co.
Unknown date	Aurea	Merchantman	Robert Thompson & Son	Sunderland	United Kingdom	For Tully & Son.
Unknown date	Aurora	Merchantman	Robert Thompson & Sons	Sunderland	United Kingdom	For Mr. Walker.
Unknown date	Belle Flower	Merchantman	J. Robinson	Sunderland	United Kingdom	For Brown & Co.
Unknown date	Bjoren	Steamboat	Akers Mekaniske Verksted	Fossveien	Norway	For private owner.
Unknown date	Britannia	Merchantman	R. Pace	Sunderland	United Kingdom	For W. Davison.
Unknown date	Bryn Ivor	Merchantman	W. Briggs	Sunderland	United Kingdom	For G. Jones.
Unknown date	Chacabuco	Corvette	Ravenhill	London	United Kingdom	For Chilean Navy.
Unknown date	Clara Lamb	Barque	James Hardie	Sunderland	United Kingdom	For Doward Dickson & Co.
Unknown date	Cleta	Barque	James Gardner	Sunderland	United Kingdom	For John Hay.
Unknown date	Colorado	Brig	George Barker	Sunderland	United Kingdom	For Barwick & Co.
Unknown date	Concordia	Snow	Sykes, Talbot & Sykes	Sunderland	United Kingdom	For Clark & Co.
Unknown date	Coronel	Merchantman	James Hardie	Sunderland	United Kingdom	For W. Nichol.
Unknown date	Coronella	Merchantman	J. Robinson	Sunderland	United Kingdom	For J. Robinson.
Unknown date	Courier	Brig	James Crown	Sunderland	United Kingdom	For private owner.
Unknown date	Czarewitch	Merchantman	G. Peverall	Sunderland	United Kingdom	For Adamson & Co.
Unknown date	Delaval	Merchantman	W. Richardson	Sunderland	United Kingdom	For T. Eccles.
Unknown date	Dignus	Merchantman	J. Lister	Sunderland	United Kingdom	For Lister & Co.
Unknown date	Drydens	Merchantman	Peter Austin	Sunderland	United Kingdom	For J. Dryden.
Unknown date	Durham	Full-rigged ship	T. R. Oswald	Sunderland	United Kingdom	For John Temperley.
Unknown date	Edeline	Barque	James Hardie	Sunderland	United Kingdom	For William Ord & Co.
Unknown date	Eden	Merchantman	George Barker	Sunderland	United Kingdom	For Rankin & Co.
Unknown date	Edwin Bassett	Merchantman	Walshaw & Whelan	Sunderland	United Kingdom	For H. Edwards.
Unknown date	Electra	Clipper	Messrs. A. Hall & Sons	Aberdeen	United Kingdom	For Messrs. Shaw. Savill & Co.
Unknown date	Elizabeth A. Oliver	Merchantman	G. Peverall	Sunderland	United Kingdom	For Wilson & Co.
Unknown date	Ellen	Snow	J. Lister	Sunderland	United Kingdom	For Peacock Bros.
Unknown date	Emilia Lamb	Barque	Gardner	Sunderland	United Kingdom	For Doward Dickson & Co.
Unknown date	Emmeline	Barque	James Hardie	Sunderland	United Kingdom	For Ord & Co.
Unknown date	Envoy	Snow	Gibbon & Nicho	Sunderland	United Kingdom	For J. Short.
Unknown date	Ethel	Merchantman	W. Pile	Sunderland	United Kingdom	For Fenwick & Co.
Unknown date	Ettie	Merchantman	G. Short	Sunderland	United Kingdom	For E. Knight.
Unknown date	Euclid	Merchantman	T. R. Oswald	Sunderland	United Kingdom	For G. Clark.
Unknown date	Fairy	Merchantman	William Pickersgill	Sunderland	United Kingdom	For Harper & Co.
Unknown date	Fides	Merchantman	D. A. Douglas	Sunderland	United Kingdom	For Dobson & Co.
Unknown date	Fido	Snow	James Crown	Southwick	United Kingdom	For G. Wilkin.
Unknown date	Flach	Submarine	Karl Flach	Valparaíso	Chile	For Chilean Government.
Unknown date	Florence	Merchantman	J. Barkes	Sunderland	United Kingdom	For D. Jenkins.
Unknown date	Floresta	Merchantman	T. Metcalf	Sunderland	United Kingdom	For Watson & Sons.
Unknown date	Friends	Merchantman	Sykes, Talbot & Sykes	Sunderland	United Kingdom	For Taylor & Co.
Unknown date	Gainsborough	Clipper		River Thames	United Kingdom	For private owner.
Unknown date	Galicia	Steamship	Messrs. Richardson, Duck & Co	Hartlepool	United Kingdom	For private owner.
Unknown date	Galilee	Merchantman	Richard Thompson	Sunderland	United Kingdom	For Mr Richardson.
Unknown date	Gem	Barque	Benjamin Hodgson & Co.	Sunderland	United Kingdom	For Walker & Co.
Unknown date	George Shotton	Merchantman	Moore	Sunderland	United Kingdom	For E. Shotton.
Unknown date	Gladstone	Barque	John Thompson	Sunderland	United Kingdom	For T. Rudd.
Unknown date	Great Yarmouth	Steamship	Thames Graving Dock Company	London	United Kingdom	For Great Eastern Railway.
Unknown date	Guadiana	Steamship		River Clyde	United Kingdom	For private owner.
Unknown date	Guam	Brig	W. Adamson	Sunderland	United Kingdom	For W. Adamson.
Unknown date	Guide	Tug	Messrs. Brodie & Maxwell	Coble Dene	United Kingdom	For Mr. Chisholm.
Unknown date	Gulnare	Merchantman	J. M. Reed	Sunderland	United Kingdom	For Robson & Co.
Unknown date	Hampshire	Steamship	T. R. Oswald	Sunderland	United Kingdom	For Hill & Co.
Unknown date	Henry Fenwick	Merchantman	Gardner	Sunderland	United Kingdom	For private owner.
Unknown date	Herval	Mariz e Barros-class ironclad		Plymouth	United Kingdom	For Imperial Brazilian Navy.
Unknown date	Hofflun	Merchantman	G. Wood	Sunderland	United Kingdom	For G. Wood.
Unknown date	Holly Bough	Merchantman	J. Briggs	Sunderland	United Kingdom	For Smith & Co.
Unknown date	Hot Bank	Merchantman	W. Chilton	Sunderland	United Kingdom	For Robinson & Co.
Unknown date	Houghton	Steamship	T. R. Oswald	Sunderland	United Kingdom	For Morton & Co.
Unknown date	Iduna	Merchantman	Robert Thompson & Sons	Sunderland	United Kingdom	For Mr. Thompson.
Unknown date	Indian Empire	Merchantman	J. Robinson	Sunderland	United Kingdom	For Mr. Brewis.
Unknown date	Industry	Thames barge	Thomas Bevan	Northfleet	United Kingdom	For John Messer Knight and Thomas Bevan.
Unknown date	Intelligent Whale	Submarine	Augustus Price and Cornelius Scranton Bushnell		United States	For American Submarine Company.
Unknown date	Iona	Steamship		River Clyde	United Kingdom	For private owner.
Unknown date	Iota	Merchantman	Messrs. Cox & Son	Bideford	United Kingdom	For Messrs. Bath.
Unknown date	Iris	Schooner		Port Huron, Michigan	United States	For private owner.
Unknown date	Iron Age	Merchantman	T. R. Oswald	Sunderland	United Kingdom	For T. R. Oswald.
Unknown date	Jane Alice	Brig	Robert Pace	Sunderland	United Kingdom	For Thompson & Co.
Unknown date	Jane Emily	Merchantman	Richard Thompson	Sunderland	United Kingdom	For Brewis & Co.
Unknown date	Jane Fenwick	Merchantman	Gardner	Sunderland	United Kingdom	For private owner.
Unknown date	Jane Lamb	Merchantman	Gardner	Sunderland	United Kingdom	For Doward Dickson & Co.
Unknown date	Jane T. Woodall	Schooner	Hempstead Barnes	Gloucester	United Kingdom	For James Fisher.
Unknown date	Jessica	Merchantman	William Doxford	Sunderland	United Kingdom	For D. C. Scott.
Unknown date	Kebroyd	Merchantman	G. Bartram	Sunderland	United Kingdom	For W. Bedford.
Unknown date	Kedron	Merchantman	B. hodgson	Sunderland	United Kingdom	For Richardson & Co.
Unknown date	Kelloe	Steamship	James Laing	Sunderland	United Kingdom	For private owner.
Unknown date	Lasborough	Steamship	Iliff & Mounsey	Sunderland	United Kingdom	For R. Gayner.
Unknown date	Lavinia	Merchantman	William Doxford	Sunderland	United Kingdom	For D. Scott.
Unknown date	Lieutenant	Clipper			United Kingdom	For George Duncan & Co.
Unknown date	Life Brigade	Merchantman	Taylor & Scoulter	Sunderland	United Kingdom	For J. Avery.
Unknown date	Livonia	Merchantman	James Laing	Sunderland	United Kingdom	For Norwood & Co.
Unknown date	London	Ketch	Charles W. Aubin	Jersey	(United Kingdom of Great Britain and Ireland) Jersey	For J. S. Renouf.
Unknown date	Lota	Frigate		Brunswick Peninsula	Chile	For Frederico Peede.
Unknown date	Lowestoft	Merchantman	J. Denniston	Sunderland	United Kingdom	For W. Balls.
Unknown date	Loyal Sam	Merchantman	William Doxford	Sunderland	United Kingdom	For S. Johnston.
Unknown date	Magnet	Merchantman	J. Haswell	Sunderland	United Kingdom	For W. Ord Jr.
Unknown date	Mariz e Barros	Mariz e Barros-class ironclad	J. and G. Rennie	Millwall	United Kingdom	For Imperial Brazilian Navy.
Unknown date	Mary Ann Annison	Merchantman	Robert Thompson Jr.	Sunderland	United Kingdom	For R. Annison.
Unknown date	Mary Elizabeth	Merchantman	Liddle & Sutcliffe	Sunderland	United Kingdom	For Buttler & Co.
Unknown date	Mary Nelson	Barque	Robert Thompson Jr.	Sunderland	United Kingdom	For H. Nelson.
Unknown date	Mayflower	Paddle steamer	Marshall Bros.	Newcastle upon Tyne	United Kingdom	For Solent Steam Packet Company.
Unknown date	Mayflower	Tug	James Tetlow	Chelsea, Massachusetts	United States	For United States Navy.
Unknown date	Meridian	Merchantman	William Pickersgill	Sunderland	United Kingdom	For J. Gibson
Unknown date	Mersey	Merchantman	T. R. Oswald	Sunderland	United Kingdom	For Powell & Co.
Unknown date	Milton	Paddle tug	George Butchard	Gravesend	United Kingdom	For Telegraph Towing Co.
Unknown date	Minnehaha	Sternwheeler	John C. Trullinger	Sucker Lake, Oregon	United Kingdom	For private owner.
Unknown date	Murray	Paddle steamer		River Clyde	United Kingdom	For private owner.
Unknown date	Myra	Brig	W. H. Pearson	Sunderland	United Kingdom	For Hall & Co.
Unknown date	Nant-y-glo	Merchantman	Mills	Sunderland	United Kingdom	For J. Pegg.
Unknown date	Narva	Merchantman	James Laing	Sunderland	United Kingdom	For Mr. Norwood.
Unknown date	Nautilus	Steamship	Messrs. Ruthven	Edinburgh	United Kingdom	For D. Ruthven. Propelled by jet of water.
Unknown date	Nenthorn	Merchantman	W. Chilton	Sunderland	United Kingdom	For A. Fairweather.
Unknown date	Nøkken	Steamship	Akers Mekaniske Verksted	Christiania	Norway	For D. Hegermann.
Unknown date	Norfolk	Steamship	James Laing	Sunderland	United Kingdom	For R. Young.
Unknown date	Ocean Drift	Merchantman	Walker & Carr	Sunderland	United Kingdom	For Bell & Co.
Unknown date	O'Higgins	Corvette		Ravenhill	United Kingdom	For Chilean Navy.
Unknown date	Orion	Barque	W. Naisby	Hylton	United Kingdom	For Mears & Co.
Unknown date	Ovington	Fishing trawler	John Barter	Brixham	United Kingdom	For Edward Williams.
Unknown date	Pansy	Merchantman	J. & J. Gibbon	Sunderland	United Kingdom	For Potts & Co.
Unknown date	Perfect	Fishing vessel	Edward Aldous	Brightlingsea	United Kingdom	For Robert Cross.
Unknown date	Pet	Schooner	Edward A. Costigan	Charlestown, Massachusetts	United States	For Joseph Henderson.
Unknown date	Petunia	Merchantman	Taylor & Scouler	Sunderland	United Kingdom	For Barrass Bros.
Unknown date	Pilgrim	Brig	Liddle & Sutcliffe	Sunderland	United Kingdom	For .
Unknown date	Professor Airey	Barque	Westacott	Appledore	United Kingdom	For private owner.
Unknown date	Rapid	Ketch	Charles W. Aubin	Jersey	(United Kingdom of Great Britain and Ireland) Jersey	For Philip Daniel Payn.
Unknown date	Rattler	Fishing vessel	John Banks Jr.	Kilpin Pike	United Kingdom	For John O. Hawke.
Unknown date	Ravenscrag	Steamship	Robert Steele & Co.	Cartsdyke	United Kingdom	For J. & A. Allen & Co.
Unknown date	Red Gauntlet	Barque	John Thompson	Sunderland	United Kingdom	For Graham & Co.
Unknown date	Rinaldo	Merchantman	T. R. Oswald	Sunderland	United Kingdom	For Swainston & Co.
Unknown date	Rio Grande	Merchantman	William Pickersgill	Sunderland	United Kingdom	For Pickersgill & Co.
Unknown date	Robert E. Lee	Paddle steamer		New Albany, Indiana	United States	For John W. Cannon.
Unknown date	Rosario	Merchantman	Liddle & Sutcliffe	Sunderland	United Kingdom	For Morrison & Co.
Unknown date	Rosy Morn	Merchantman	Reay & Naisby	Sunderland	United Kingdom	For Beynin & Co.
Unknown date	Royal Berkshire	Barque	J. Robinson	Sunderland	United Kingdom	For Mr. Flanagan.
Unknown date	Saffron	Merchantman	J. Denniston	Sunderland	United Kingdom	For Watson & Co.
Unknown date	Saint Cuthbert	Merchantman	L. Wheatley	Sunderland	United Kingdom	For Dent & Co.
Unknown date	Sea Swallow	Barque	Richard Thompson	Deptford	United Kingdom	For W. Thompson.
Unknown date	Serena	Barque	W. Pile	Sunderland	United Kingdom	For Madge & Co.
Unknown date	Shincliffe	Merchantman	J. Robinson	Sunderland	United Kingdom	For Nicholson & Co.
Unknown date	Silksworth	Merchantman	Rawson & Watdon	Sunderland	United Kingdom	For G. Watson.
Unknown date	Sjomanden	Barque	Wood	Sunderland	United Kingdom	For Monsen & Co.
Unknown date	Skorpionen	Skorpionen-class monitor			Norway	For Royal Norwegian Navy.
Unknown date	Sooloo	Barque	W. Adamson	Sunderland	United Kingdom	For W. Adamson.
Unknown date	Souvenir	Steamship	Messrs. L. Hill & Co.	Port Glasgow	United Kingdom	For Messrs. Sydney & Wiggins.
Unknown date	Sparkle	Merchantman	L. Wheatley	Sunderland	United Kingdom	For Mr. Humphry.
Unknown date	Stag	Merchantman	James Robinson	Sunderland	United Kingdom	For J. Robinson.
Unknown date	Star	Merchantman	Robert Thompson & Sons	Sunderland	United Kingdom	For W. Kish.
Unknown date	Stonehouse	Full-rigged ship	J. Smurthwaite	Sunderland	United Kingdom	For J. Morison.
Unknown date	Sumatra	Merchantman	James Laing	Sunderland	United Kingdom	For Ingham & Co.
Unknown date	Sussex	Merchantman	George Barker	Sunderland	United Kingdom	For G. & J. Robinson.
Unknown date	Thalia	Barque	W. H. Pearson	Sunderland	United Kingdom	For "L'chamim".
Unknown date	Thetis	Steamship	Pile, Hay & Co	Sunderland	United Kingdom	For Ryde & Co.
Unknown date	Thoon Kramom	Barque		Bangkok	Siam	For Siamese Government.
Unknown date	Thornton	Barque	W. H. Pearson	Sunderland	United Kingdom	For Dixon & Co.
Unknown date	Threepwood	Merchantman	Walker & Carr	Sunderland	United Kingdom	For J. White.
Unknown date	Three Sisters	Snow	T. Stonehouse	Sunderland	United Kingdom	For T. Riley.
Unknown date	Thrush	Barque	R. H. Potts & Bros.	Sunderland	United Kingdom	For Potts Bros.
Unknown date	Tongoy	Barque	W. Pile	Sunderland	United Kingdom	For Madge & Co.
Unknown date	Trinidad	Merchantman	William Doxford	Sunderland	United Kingdom	For Olano & Co.
Unknown date	Troas	Barque	J. Robinson	Sunderland	United Kingdom	For Foreman & Co.
Unknown date	Valetta	Barque	John Thompson	Sunderland	United Kingdom	For Forster & Co.
Unknown date	Velocity	Barque	Robert Thompson Jr.	Sunderland	United Kingdom	For T. Todd.
Unknown date	Wenonah	Paddle steamer	Alexander Peter Cockburn	Lake Muskoka	(United Kingdom of Great Britain and Ireland) Province of Canada	For Muskoka Navigation Company.
Unknown date	Woodbine	Barque	G. Short	Sunderland	United Kingdom	For Doxford & Co.
Unknown date	Young Jessey	Merchantman	Liddle & Sutcliffe	Sunderland	United Kingdom	For J. Welham.
