= Hilary Andoe =

Admiral Sir Hilary Gustavus Andoe KCB
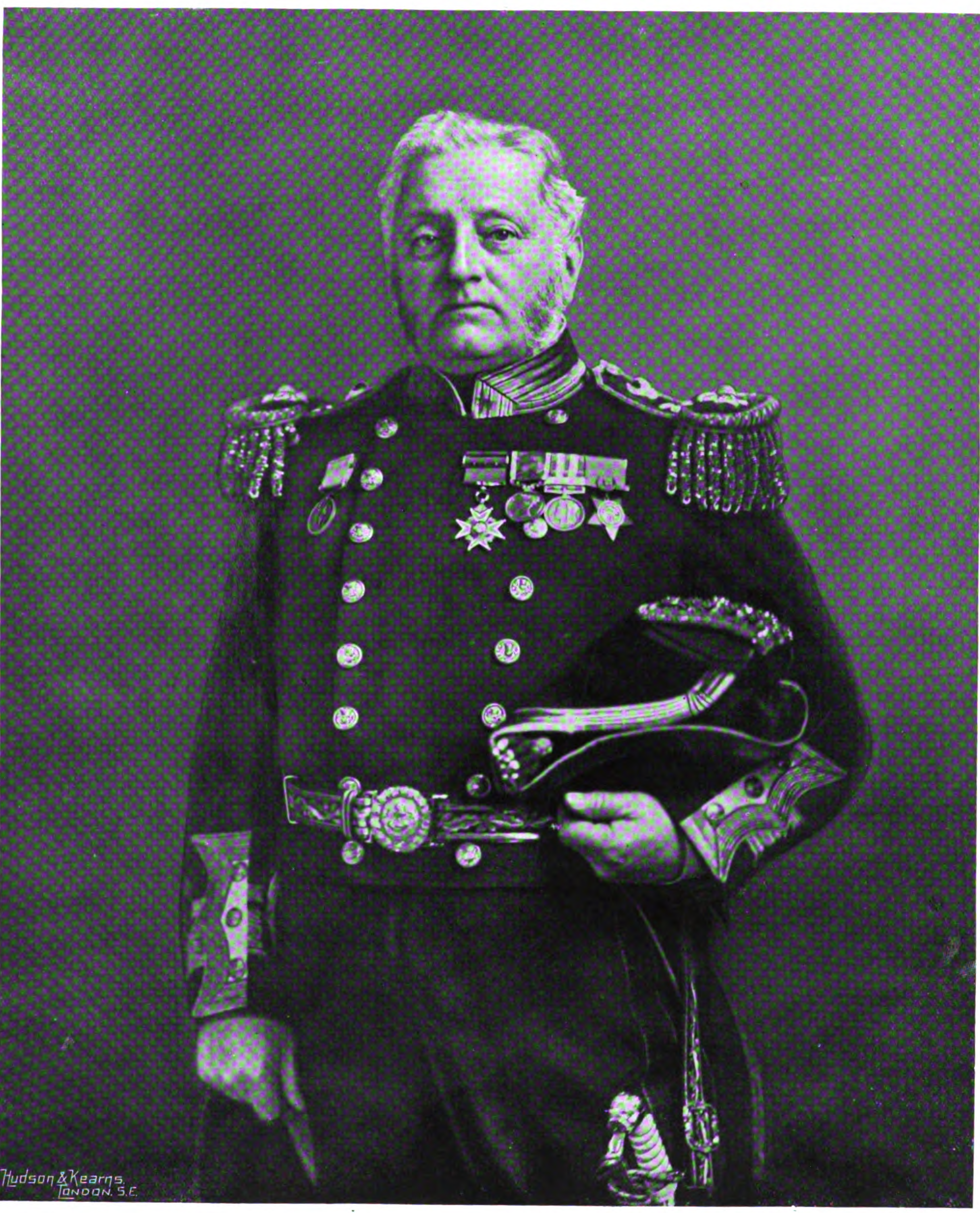
- Born: 19 January 1841
- Died: 11 February 1905 (aged 64)
- Military career
- Allegiance: United Kingdom
- Branch: Royal Navy
- Service years: 1855–1901
- Rank: Admiral
- Commands: Chatham Dockyard; HMS Orontes; HMS Vigilant
- Conflicts: Crimean War; Bombardment of Sveaborg; First Boer War; Anglo-Egyptian War; Mahdist War
- Awards: Knight Commander of the Order of the Bath; Mentioned in Despatches

Admiral Sir Hilary Gustavus Andoe, KCB (19 February 1841 – 11 February 1905) was a Royal Navy officer.

== Naval career ==
The son of a civil servant, Andoe joined the Royal Navy in 1855 and actively participated in the bombardment of Sveaborg the same year. Promoted to lieutenant in 1861, he was engaged in the suppression of the slave trade on the east coast of Africa from 1863 to 1867 as acting commander of HMS Vigilant. In 1869, he received the Royal Humane Society's Bronze Medal for jumping into the River Plate off Montevideo to save a boy belonging to HMS Pylades.

Promoted to commander in 1872 and captain in 1878, Andoe served as principal transport officer in Natal during the First Boer War. He took part in the Anglo-Egyptian War of 1882 as captain of HMS Orontes. He was principal transport officer in Trinkitat and Sudan during the military operations there in February and March 1884, for which he was mentioned in despatches and appointed a Companion of the Order of the Bath; he later received a captain's good service pension.

Promoted to rear-admiral in 1894, Andoe was an umpire in that year's annual manoeuvres. In 1895, he was appointed Admiral Superintendent, Chatham Dockyard. Promoted to vice-admiral in 1899, he retired in 1901. He was knighted as a Knight Commander of the Order of the Bath in 1902 and advanced to admiral on the retired list in 1904.
