= Arthur Dalrymple Fanshawe =

Royal Navy Admiral of the Fleet (1847–1936)

Admiral of the Fleet Sir Arthur Fanshawe GCB GCVO
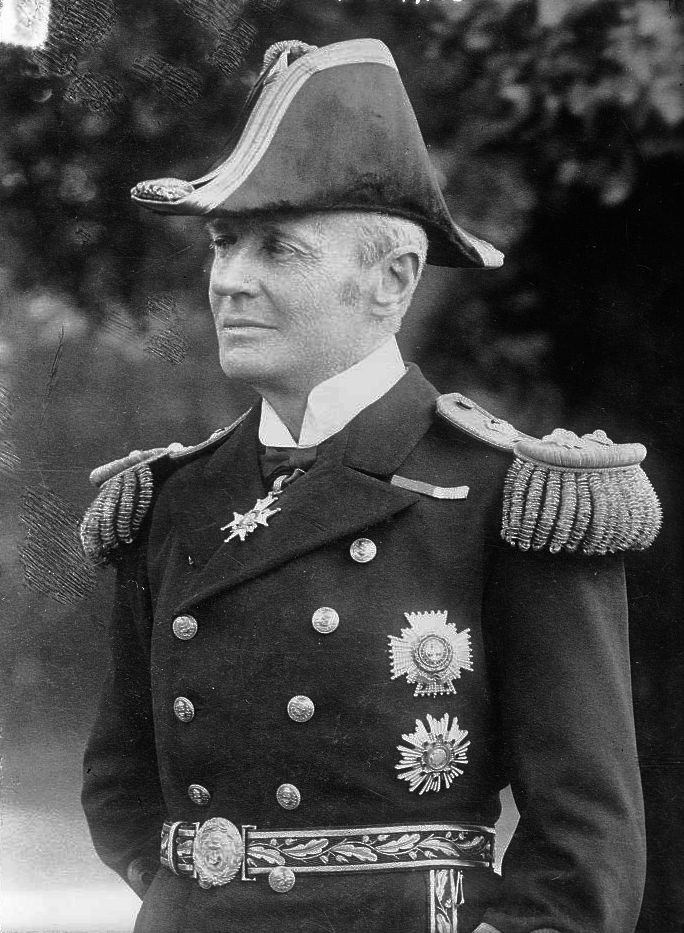
- Admiral Sir Arthur Fanshawe c.1908
- Born: 2 April 1847; Southsea, Hampshire
- Died: 21 January 1936 (aged 88); London
- Military career
- Allegiance: United Kingdom
- Branch: Royal Navy
- Service years: 1860–1910
- Rank: Admiral of the Fleet
- Commands: Portsmouth Command; Royal Naval College, Greenwich; Australia Station; HMS Alexandra; HMS Benbow; HMS Aurora; HMS Malabar; HMS Jumna; HMS Ganges
- Awards: Knight Grand Cross of the Order of the Bath; Knight Grand Cross of the Royal Victorian Order; Order of the Sacred Treasure (Japan)

Admiral of the Fleet Sir Arthur Dalrymple Fanshawe, GCB, GCVO (2 April 1847 – 21 January 1936) was a Royal Navy officer. As a captain he became commanding officer, successively, of the troopships HMS Jumna and HMS Malabar, which were tasked with ferrying troops between the United Kingdom and India. These were difficult commands with regular disputes between the military officers in charge of the troops and the naval officers in command of the ships.

Fanshawe went on to be second in command of the Channel Squadron, in which capacity he acted as umpire during the Naval Manoeuvres that took place in August 1900 and then became Commander-in-Chief Australia Station, in which role he was involved in concluding the naval agreement between the United Kingdom and the Commonwealth of Australia under which the Commonwealth Naval Forces evolved to become the Royal Australian Navy. After that he became President of the Royal Naval College, Greenwich and then Commander-in-Chief, Portsmouth.

== Early career ==
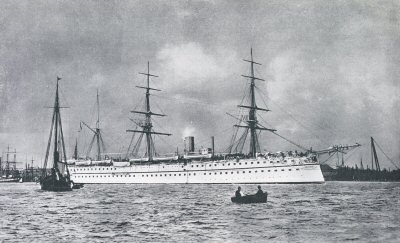
The troopship HMS Malabar, which Fanshawe commanded

Born the son of Admiral Sir Edward Gennys Fanshawe and Jane Fanshawe (née Cardwell), Fanshawe was educated at Blackheath and joined the Royal Navy as a cadet in the training ship HMS Britannia at Portsmouth in September 1860. He was promoted to sub-lieutenant on 6 June 1867 and appointed to the frigate HMS Constance on the North America and West Indies Station. Promoted to lieutenant on 21 September 1868, he transferred to the armoured cruiser HMS Ocean on the China Station in July 1869 and then became flag lieutenant to his father in the armoured ship HMS Royal Alfred on the North America and West Indies Station in September 1870. Promoted to commander on 5 January 1874, he became executive officer in the frigate HMS Undaunted, flagship of the East Indies Station, in March 1875. He then became commanding officer of the training ship HMS Ganges at Falmouth in July 1879.

Promoted to captain on 31 December 1881, he became commanding officer of the troopship HMS Jumna, which was tasked with ferrying troops between the United Kingdom and India, in December 1886 and he became commanding officer of the troopship HMS Malabar, which had a similar role, in August 1887. These were difficult commands with regular disputes between the military officers in charge of the troops and the naval officers in command of the ships. He went on to be commanding officer of the cruiser HMS Aurora in the Channel Squadron in early 1890 and commanding officer of the battleship HMS Alexandra, flagship of the Admiral Superintendent of Naval Reserves, in September 1892. He was appointed aide-de-camp to the Queen on 1 January 1895.

== Senior command ==
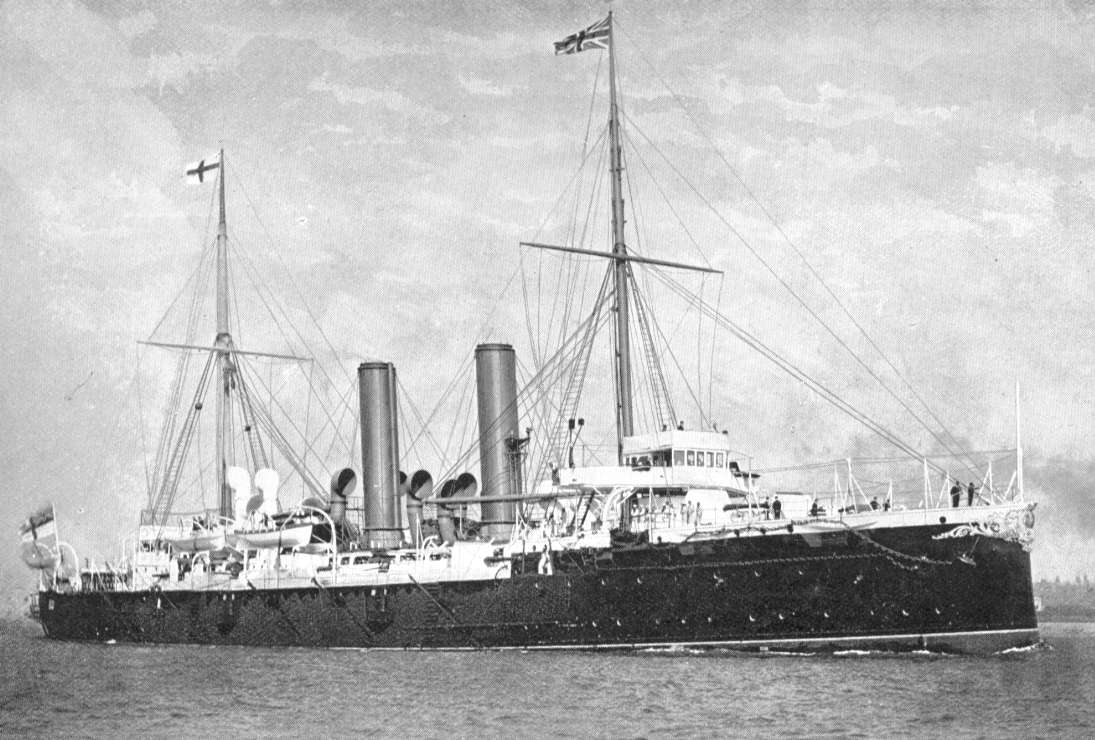
The cruiser HMS Royal Arthur, Fanshawe's flagship as Commander-in-Chief of the Australia Station

Promoted to rear admiral on 23 February 1897, Fanshawe became second in command of the Channel Squadron, with his flag in the battleship HMS Magnificent, in June 1899. He acted as umpire during the Naval Manoeuvres that took place in August 1900.

Fanshawe was promoted to vice admiral on 25 January 1902. In early October that year it was announced that he would be appointed Commander-in-Chief, Australia Station, thus upgrading the commander of this station from rear-admiral to vice-admiral. He was received in audience by King Edward VII in early December, then left for Australia to take up the position early the following year, with his flag hoisted in the protected cruiser HMS Royal Arthur on 16 January 1903. In this capacity he was involved in concluding the naval agreement between the United Kingdom and the Commonwealth of Australia under which the Commonwealth Naval Forces evolved to become the Royal Australian Navy. For this he was appointed a Knight Commander of the Order of the Bath on 9 November 1904 in the King's Birthday Honours.

Promoted to full admiral on 22 July 1905, Fanshawe became President of the Royal Naval College, Greenwich in October 1906 and went on to be Commander-in-Chief, Portsmouth in March 1908. He was awarded the Japanese Order of the Sacred Treasure in 1908 and appointed a Knight Grand Cross of the Royal Victorian Order on 31 July 1909. Promoted to Admiral of the Fleet on 30 April 1910, he was advanced to Knight Grand Cross of the Order of the Bath on 19 June 1911.

Fanshawe was not employed during the First World War and retired completely in April 1917. He lived at Donnington Hall near Ledbury in Herefordshire and died in London on 21 January 1936 aged 88.

== Family ==
In January 1874 Fanshawe married Sarah Frances Fox; they had two daughters and two sons:

- Winifred Edith Fanshawe, who married in 1902 Rev. Edmund Hugh Rycroft, third son of Sir Nelson Rycroft, Bart.
- Renee L. Fanshawe
- Richard D. Fanshawe
- Captain Guy Dalrymple Fanshawe (1882–1962), a Royal Navy officer and Member of Parliament

== Sources ==
- Heathcote, Tony (2002). The British Admirals of the Fleet 1734 – 1995. Pen & Sword Ltd. ISBN 0-85052-835-6.

Military offices
Preceded by Sir Lewis Beaumont	Commander-in-Chief, Australia Station; 1903–1905	Succeeded by Sir Wilmot Fawkes
Preceded by Sir Robert Harris	President, Royal Naval College, Greenwich; 1906–1908	Succeeded by Sir John Durnford
Preceded by Sir Day Bosanquet	Commander-in-Chief, Portsmouth; 1908–1910	Succeeded by Sir Assheton Curzon-Howe
