= George Watson (Royal Navy officer) =

Royal Navy Admiral (1827-1897)

Admiral Sir George Watson KCB
- Born: 5 April 1827
- Died: 26 April 1897 (aged 70)
- Military career
- Allegiance: United Kingdom
- Branch: Royal Navy
- Rank: Admiral
- Commands: HMS Peterel; HMS Crocodile; HMS Duncan; HMS Victor Emanuel; HMS Temeraire; North America and West Indies Station
- Awards: Knight Commander of the Order of the Bath

Admiral Sir George Willes Watson, KCB (5 April 1827 – 26 April 1897) was a Royal Navy officer who went on to be Commander-in-Chief, North America and West Indies Station.

== Naval career ==
Watson joined the Royal Navy in 1841. Promoted to commander in 1858, he was given command of HMS Peterel in 1862. Promoted to captain in 1864, he went on to command HMS Crocodile, HMS Duncan, HMS Victor Emanuel and HMS Temeraire. During the American Civil War he was accused of assisting the Confederate States of America by selling the cruiser CSS Florida to them.

He was appointed Commodore-in-Charge, Hong Kong from March 1876 to March 1879. His next appointment was Admiral-Superintendent, Chatham in 1881 and Commander-in-Chief, North America and West Indies Station in 1888 before retiring in 1892.

He was promoted to full admiral on 25 February 1892, and retired two months later.

== Family ==
In 1864 he married Margaretta Campbell.

Military offices
Preceded by Sir Algernon Lyons	Commander-in-Chief, North America and West Indies Station; 1888–1891	Succeeded by Sir John Hopkins
