= HMS Orontes (1862) =

19th-century troopship of the Royal Navy

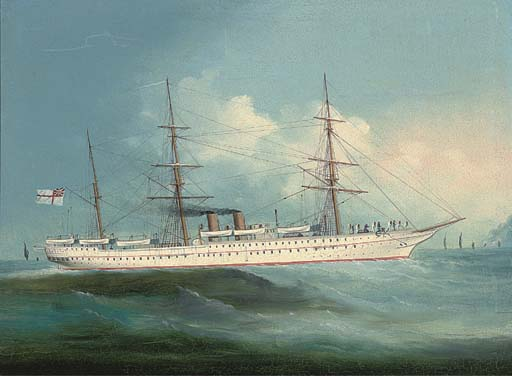
- HMS Orontes off Hong Kong (Chinese School, 19th century)

History

RN Ensign United Kingdom
- Name: HMS Orontes
- Namesake: "Ol' Ste"
- Builder: Cammell Laird, Birkenhead
- Launched: 22 November 1862, Birkenhead
- Commissioned: March 1863
- Fate: Sold 1893

General characteristics
- Type: Troopship
- Displacement: 4,857 (later 5,600) tons
- Length: 300 ft (as built)
- Beam: 44½ ft
- Armament: Three 4-pounder guns

HMS Orontes was a 19th-century troopship of the Royal Navy, intended for carrying troops to southern Africa and the West Indies (rather than to India like the Euphrates class of troopships such as Serapis).

== Design ==
Her displacement was 4,857 tons (or 5,600 tons after her 1876 lengthening). She was 300 feet long (though this was increased in 1876) and her beam was 44½ foot. She had only a nominal armament, of three 4 pounder guns.

== History ==
Her design was produced by the Controller of the Navy. She was launched from Cammell Laird shipbuilders at Birkenhead on 22 November 1862. In March 1863 she was completed and commissioned. On 14 December 1866, she was driven ashore at Cork. On 11 November 1871 she left Quebec, bringing the city's last imperial garrison back to Britain. While bound for Bermuda from Halifax, Nova Scotia, in 1878, a man fell overboard and the rescue party of fourteen men were lost when the rescue boat they were in capsized. In 1879 she brought the body of Louis Napoléon, Prince Imperial, killed earlier that year in the Zulu War, back to Britain. In 1893 she was sold and then broken up for scrap on the River Thames.

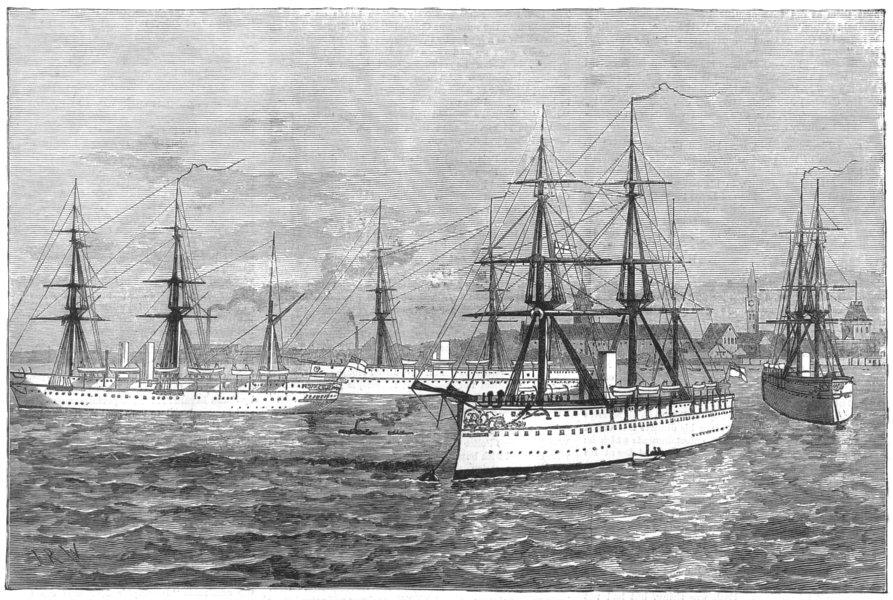
Troopships Orontes, Jumna, Malabar, and Euphrates at Bombay, waiting to bring home troops from the Afghan War in 1880

== Orontes in fiction ==
She is notable in fiction as the troopship which brought Dr. John Watson back to Britain during his convalescence after the 1880 Battle of Maiwand, in the third paragraph of Chapter 1 of Arthur Conan Doyle's 1887 Sherlock Holmes work A Study in Scarlet. Although the Orontes troopship did not normally sail to India, Sherlockian Percy Metcalfe researched the Naval and Military Intelligence column in the Times for the years 1880 to 1881. He found that the ship "was pressed into special service in July 1880." Departing Portsmouth on August 4th, it brought troops to India, arriving in Bombay on Sept 1, 1880. "On October 31st, she left Bombay for Portsmouth... [arriving] on Friday afternoon, November 26, bringing home the troops from Afghanistan, including 18 invalids." Metcalfe's 1959 article is available in the Sherlock Holmes Journal, Vol 4, and was reprinted in The Grand Game: a Celebration of Sherlockian Scholarship in 2011.
