= HMS Crocodile (1867) =

Euphrates-class troop-ship in service of the English Royal Navy

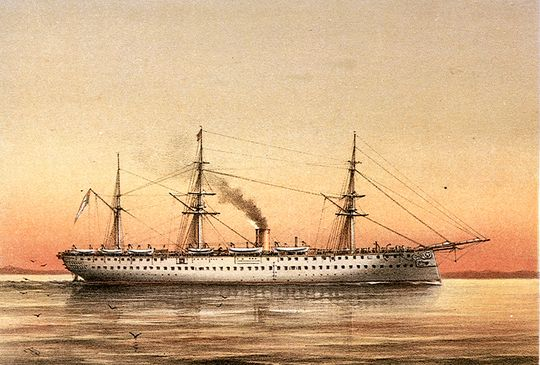

History

United Kingdom
- Name: HMS Crocodile
- Ordered: 1865
- Builder: Money Wigram and Sons
- Launched: 7 January 1867
- Fate: Sold 11 May 1894

General characteristics
- Class & type: Euphrates-class troopship
- Displacement: 6,211 tons
- Tons burthen: 4,206 tons BM
- Length: 360 ft (109.7 m) (overall)
- Beam: 49 ft 1.5 in (15.0 m)
- Depth of hold: 22 ft 4 in (6.81 m)
- Installed power: As built: 4,044 ihp (3,016 kW); From 1869: unknown
- Propulsion: 2-cylinder horizontal single-expansion (later compound-expansion) trunk engine; Single screw
- Sail plan: Barque
- Speed: 15 kn (28 km/h)
- Armament: Three 4-pounder guns

HMS Crocodile was a Euphrates-class troopship launched into the Thames from the Blackwall Yard of Money Wigram and Sons on 7 January 1867. She was the fourth and last vessel of the Royal Navy to carry the name.

== Design ==
Crocodile was one of five iron-hulled vessels of the Euphrates class. All five were built to a design of 360 feet (110 m) overall length by about 49 feet (15 m) breadth, although Malabar was very slightly smaller than the rest of the class. They had a single screw, a speed of 14 knots (26 km/h; 16 mph), one funnel, a barque-rig sail plan, three 4-pounder guns, and a white painted hull. Her bow was a "ram bow" which projected forward below the waterline.

== Identification ==
The Euphrates-class troopships could each be identified by a different coloured hull band. Crocodile's hull band was yellow. The blue hull band of her sister Euphrates became the standard for all HM Troopships.

== Career ==
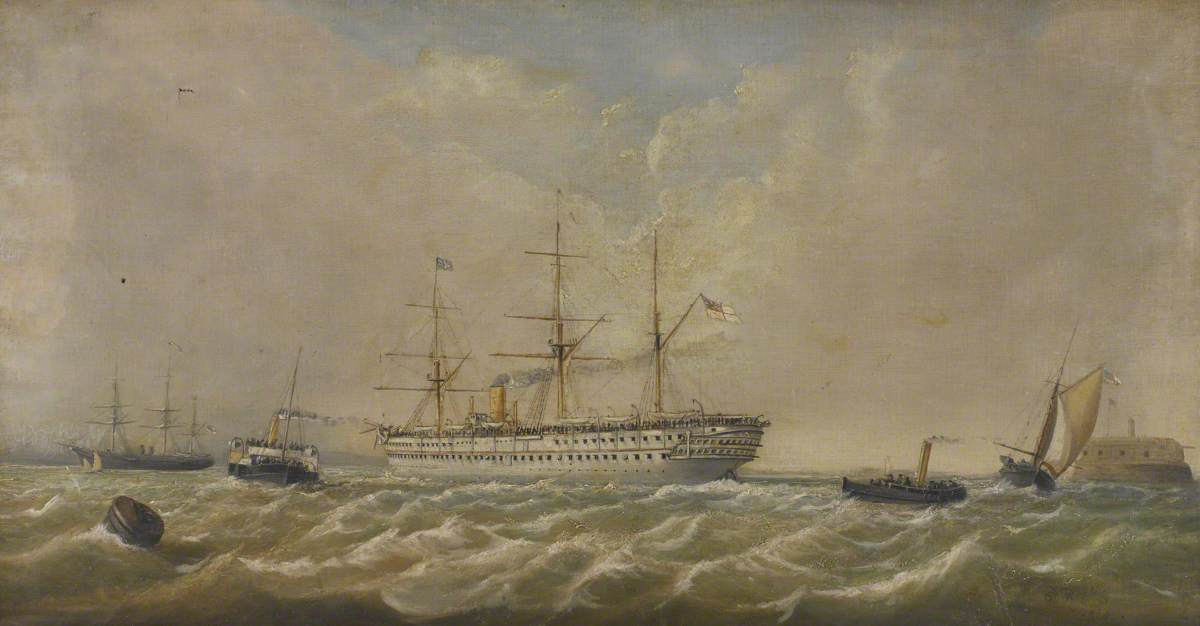
HM troopship Crocodile, in the Spithead Channel, 1880

Crocodile was built for the transport of troops between the United Kingdom and the Indian sub-continent, and was operated by the Royal Navy. She carried up to 1,200 troops and family on a passage of approximately 70 days. Between November 1866 and April 1870 she was commanded by Captain George Willes Watson. On 27 November 1867, she collided with the Canadian merchant ship John Dwyer in the English Channel 40 nautical miles (74 km; 46 mi) off Start Point, Devon. John Dwyer sank with the loss of four of her crew. Crocodile rescued the survivors.

Crocodile was re-engined rather later in life than her sisters, with her single-expansion steam engine replaced with a more efficient compound-expansion type. (Note: Winfield does not show a re-enginning of Crocodile. This is a misprint and the Errata should be consulted.)

In December 1888, Crocodile towed the Dutch steamship Sourabaja to Malta, the steamship having suffered an engine failure 9 nautical miles (17 km; 10 mi) off Cape Trafalgar, Spain. Crocodile's last voyage began at Bombay in October 1893. On 3 November, as she was approaching Aden, the high-pressure steam cylinder exploded and the ship came to a halt. The next day she was towed to an anchorage near Aden. Most of the soldiers and their families were brought home on other ships. Crocodile eventually arrived back at Portsmouth on 30 December 1893, having travelled using only the low-pressure steam cylinder, and was not further employed for trooping.

== Fate ==
Crocodile was sold for breaking on 11 May 1894.
