= SS Saint-Laurent =

Ocean liner (1866–1902)

History
- Name: Saint-Laurent
- Owner: Compagnie Générale Transatlantique
- Builder: Chantier Scott, Saint-Nazaire
- Launched: 19 April 1866
- Out of service: 1902
- Fate: Scrapped

General characteristics
- Type: Ocean liner
- Tonnage: 3,413 GRT
- Length: 355 feet (108 m)
- Beam: 43.75 feet (13.34 m)
- Propulsion: Steam engine with sailing rig
- Speed: 12 knots (14 mph)
- Capacity: 128

SS Saint-Laurent was an ocean liner operated by Compagnie Générale Transatlantique (CGT) in transatlantic service.

She was built by the Chantier Scott shipyard in Saint-Nazaire, France, and was the first transatlantic ocean liner constructed in France, as well as CGT's first screw-driven liner. Her design was based on the Cunard Line's RMS Persia, albeit adapted to screw propulsion. She was launched in 1866, and entered service on CGT's route between Le Havre and New York City, before sailing to Central America later in her career. She operated until 1902, when she was scrapped in Italy.

Saint-Laurent measured 3,413 gross register tons, with a length of 355 feet (108 m) and a beam of 43.75 feet (13.34 m). She had a passenger capacity of 211—128 in first class, 54 in second class, and 29 in third class. She was originally built with a single compound steam engine driving one screw and a three-masted sailing rig, capable of propelling her to a 12 knots (14 mph) service speed, built by Schneider and Company ; in 1875 and 1876 she received new triple expansion engines. Her screw propulsion was a major improvement over CGT's existing paddlewheel steamships, and spurred the company to convert most of its fleet in North Atlantic service to screws.
