= HMS Serapis (1866) =

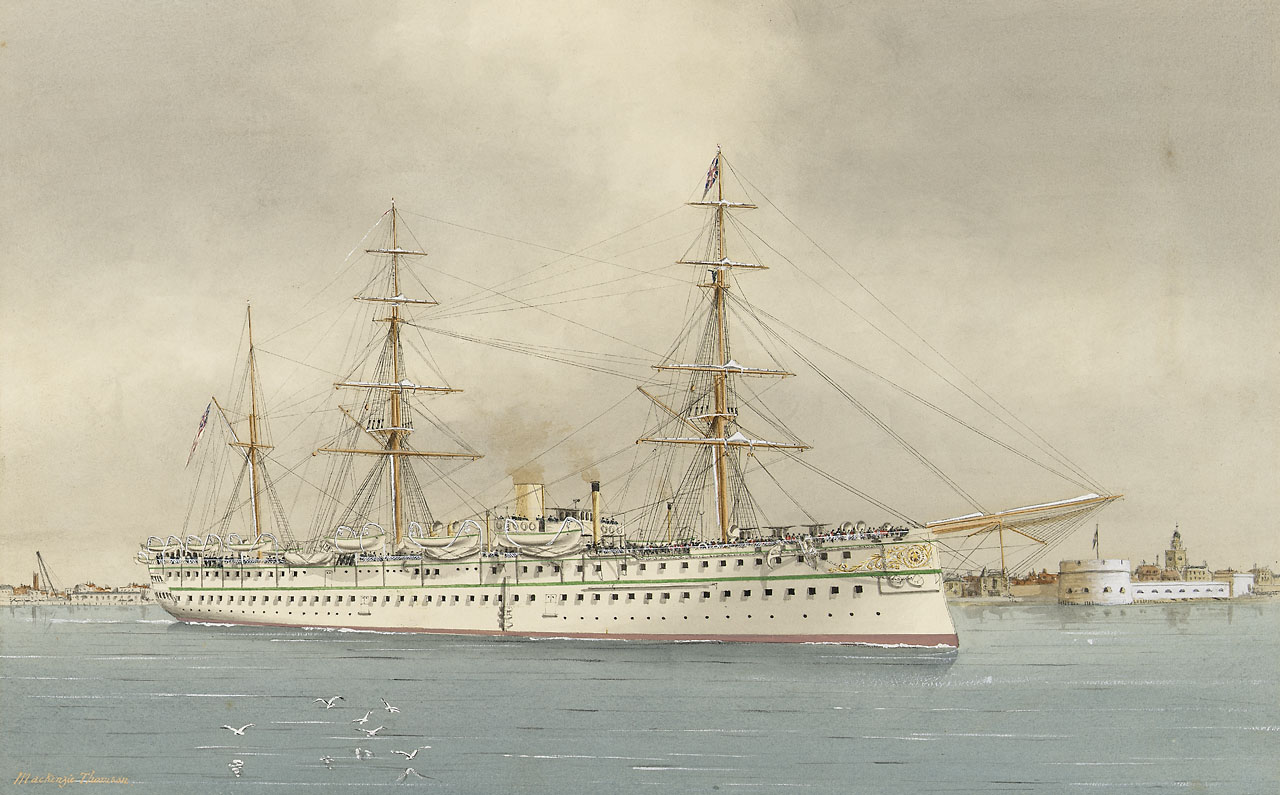
- HMS Serapis

History

United Kingdom
- Name: HMS Serapis
- Ordered: 1865
- Builder: Thames Shipbuilding Co., Leamouth, London
- Yard number: 12F
- Launched: 26 September 1866
- Commissioned: 2 October 1876 at Portsmouth
- Fate: Sold 23 November 1894

General characteristics
- Class & type: Euphrates-class troopship
- Displacement: 6,211 tons
- Tons burthen: 4,206 tons BM
- Length: 360 ft (109.7 m) (overall)
- Beam: 49 ft 1.5 in (15.0 m)
- Depth of hold: 22 ft 4 in (6.81 m)
- Installed power: As built: 3,945 ihp (2,942 kW); From 1869: 4,028 ihp (3,004 kW)
- Propulsion: As built: 4-cylinder horizontal compound-expansion steam engine; Single screw; From 1869: 2-cylinder single-expansion steam engine; Single screw
- Sail plan: Barque
- Speed: 14 kn (26 km/h)
- Armament: Three 4-pounder guns

HMS Serapis was a Euphrates-class troopship commissioned for the transport of troops to and from India. She was launched in the Thames on 26 September 1866 from the Thames Ironworks and Shipbuilding Company at Leamouth, London and was the third Royal Navy ship to bear the name. She was sold in 1894.

== Design ==
Serapis was one of five iron-hulled vessels of the Euphrates class. All five were built to a design of 360 feet (110 m) overall length by about 49 feet (15 m) breadth, although Malabar was very slightly smaller than the rest of the class. They had a single screw, a speed of 14 knots (26 km/h; 16 mph), one funnel, a barque-rig sail plan, three 4-pounder guns and a white-painted hull. Her bow was a "ram bow" which projected forward below the waterline.

== Career ==
She spent all of her career on the United Kingdom to India route carrying troops, a trip that averaged 70 days. She was the only one of her class to have been completed with a compound-expansion steam engine at build, and was the first of her class to be re-engined. While her sisters replaced their single-expansion engines with compound-expansion engines, she had the opposite adaption; her 4-cylinder horizontal compound-expansion steam engine was replaced in 1869 with a 2-cylinder single-expansion steam engine. The indicated power remained almost the same, and her top speed was largely unaffected, remaining at about 14 knots.

On 12 March 1871, Serapis broke her main shaft. She was taken in tow by the British steamship Diomed. The tow was later transferred to HMS Crocodile, which towed Serapis in to Port Said, Egypt. On 22 October 1872, Serapis ran aground in the Suez Canal. She was refloated on 24 October and resumed her voyage to British Raj. On 15 October 1873, she collided with a French schooner in the Indian Ocean. The schooner sank with the loss of a crew member. Serapis rescued the survivors. On 6 December, she collided with the British steamship Paladine at Malta. Paladine was severely damaged, Serapis was slightly damaged but had to put back to Malta for repairs. In September 1875 she transported the Prince of Wales to India to celebrate Queen Victoria's appointment as Empress of India. In 1884 the commanding officer, Captain Arthur Dupuis, was suspended after the ship grounded off Portland. In April 1886 she became part of the Indian training squadron.. On 24 November, she ran aground at Southsea, Hampshire. She was on a voyage from Suez, Egypt to Portsmouth, Hampshire. She was refloated with assistance from two tugs and taken in to Portsmouth.

== Fate ==
She was sold to I Cohen on 23 November 1894 along with her sister ship Euphrates.

== Identification ==
All five Euphrates-class troopships could be identified by a different coloured hull band. Serapis had a green hull band.
