= HMS Malabar (1866) =

1866 Euphrates-class troopship

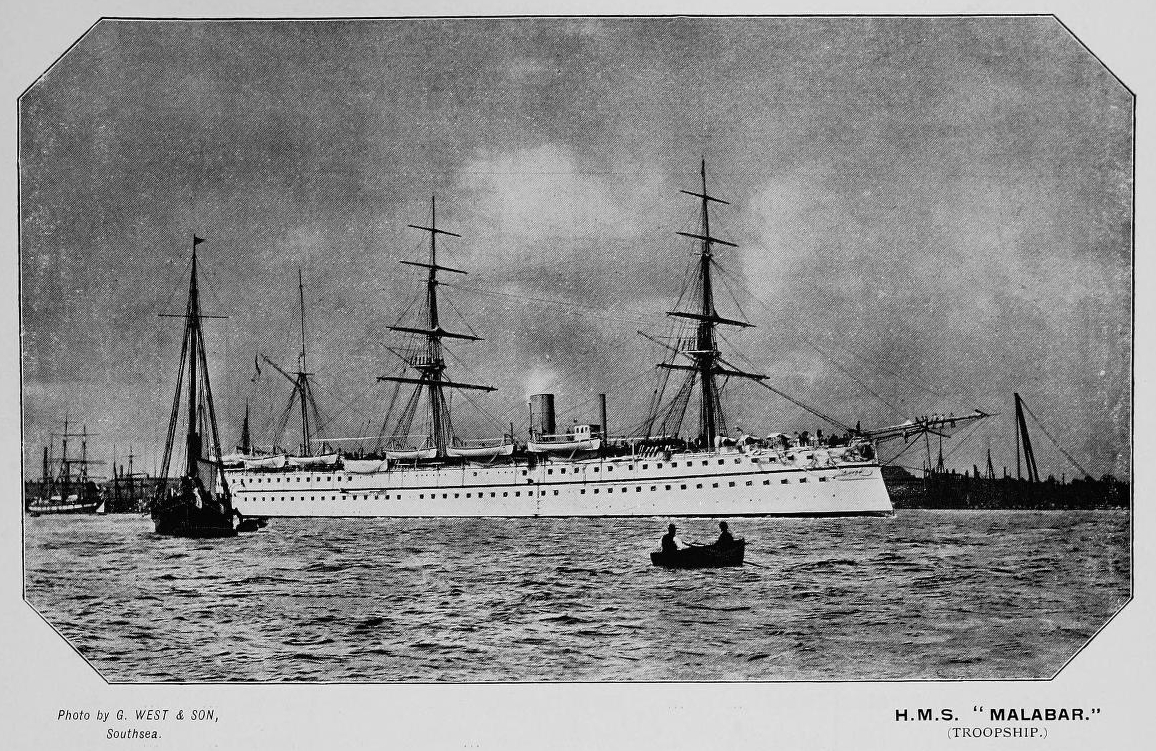

History

United Kingdom
- Name: HMS Malabar
- Ordered: 1865
- Builder: Thames Shipbuilding Co., Leamouth, London
- Yard number: 120
- Launched: 8 December 1866 (Note: Although Winfield has 1865, this is a misprint and should read 1866. Copies of the Errata may be requested from the author.)
- Fate: Became the base ship at Bermuda in 1897; Renamed HMS Terror on 1 May 1905; Sold in January 1918

General characteristics
- Class & type: Euphrates-class troopship
- Displacement: 6,186 tons
- Tons burthen: 4,189 tons BM
- Length: 360 ft (109.7 m) (overall)
- Beam: 49 ft 0.75 in (15.0 m)
- Depth of hold: 22 ft 4 in (6.81 m)
- Installed power: As built: 4,893 ihp (3,649 kW); From 1873: unknown
- Propulsion: 2-cylinder horizontal single-expansion (later compound-expansion) trunk engine; Single screw
- Sail plan: Barque
- Speed: 15 kn (28 km/h)
- Armament: Three 4-pounder guns

HMS Malabar was a Euphrates-class troopship launched in 1866, and the fifth ship of the Royal Navy to employ the name. She was designed to carry troops between the United Kingdom and British India, and was employed in that role for most of her life. She became the base ship (or depot ship) at the Royal Naval Dockyard, Bermuda in 1897. She was renamed Terror in 1901 and sold in 1918. Her name was later used as the stone frigate to which shore personnel in Bermuda were enrolled, and later for Her Majesty's Naval Base Bermuda, after the 1950s, when the dockyard was reduced to a base.

== Design ==
Malabar was one of five iron-hulled vessels of the Euphrates class. All five were built to a design of 360 ft overall length by about 49 ft breadth, although Malabar was very slightly smaller than the rest of the class. They had a single screw, a speed of 14 knots, one funnel, a barque-rig sail plan, three 4-pounder guns, and a white painted hull. Her bow was a "ram bow" which projected forward below the waterline.

== Identification ==
The Euphrates-class troopships could each be identified by a different coloured hull band. The Malabar's hull band was black. The blue hull band of her sister Euphrates became the standard for all HM Troopships.

== Career ==
She was built to transport troops between the United Kingdom and the Indian sub-continent, and was operated by the Royal Navy. She carried up to 1,200 troops and family on a passage of approximately 70 days.

In common with her sisters, she was re-engined, her single-expansion steam engine being replaced with a Napier 2-cylinder compound-expansion engine in 1873.

On 2 November 1878, she suffered an engine breakdown in the English Channel 17 nautical miles (31 km) east south east of Prawle Point, Devon whilst on a voyage from Portsmouth, Hampshire to India. She was taken in tow by the steamship Benjamin Whitworth, which with the assistance of two Admiralty tugs took her in to Plymouth, Devon. In 1878 or early 1879 she grounded in Whitsand Bay near Plymouth. Her commanding officer, Captain Percy Luxmoore, was dismissed from the ship and replaced by Captain John Grant.

Between August 1887 and early 1890 she was commanded by Captain Arthur Dalrymple Fanshawe.

== Fate ==
She became the depot ship at Bermuda in 1897 and was renamed HMS Terror on 1 May 1905; the name Malabar was later used by the Royal Naval dockyard at Bermuda. Terror was sold in January 1918.

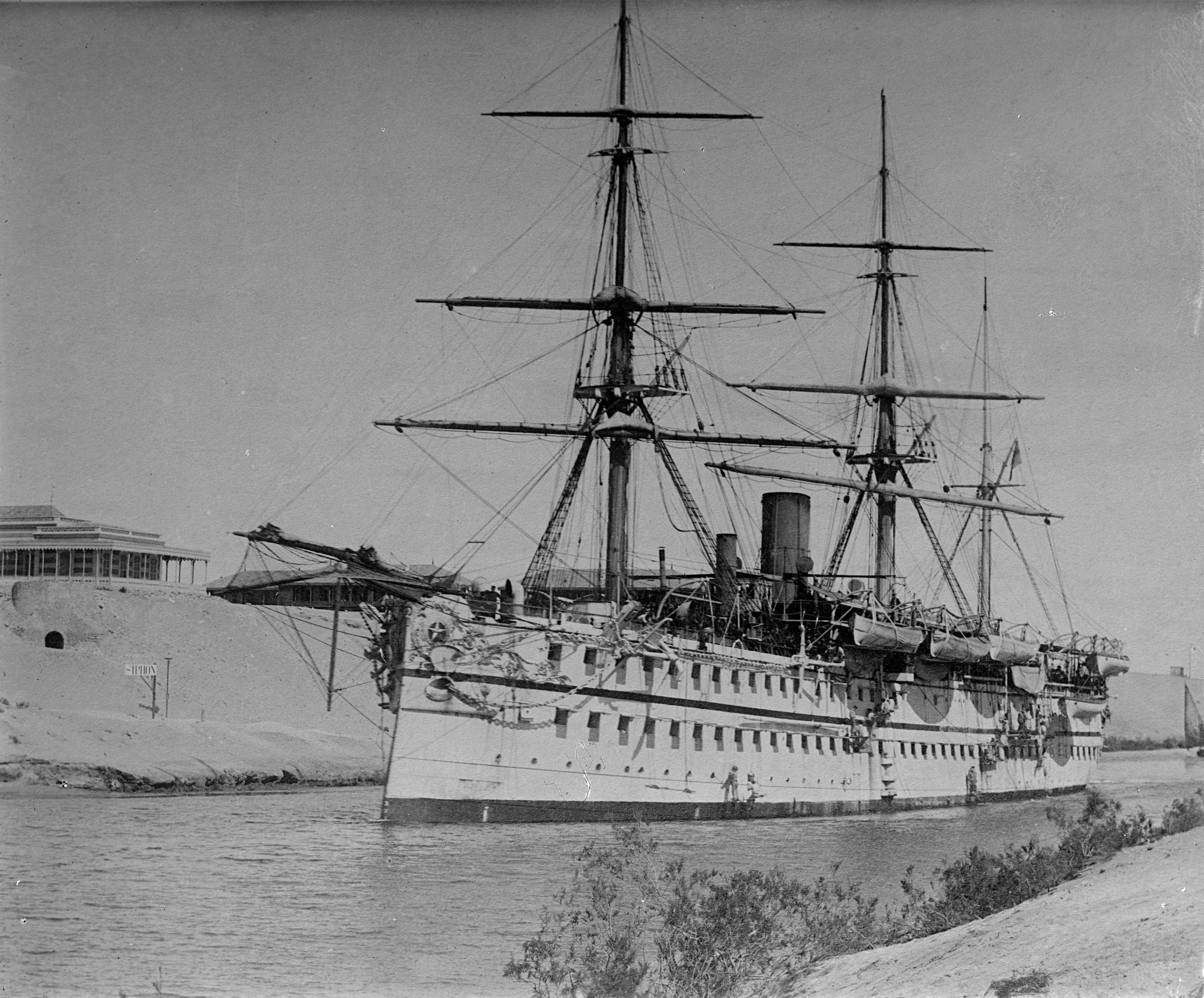
HMS Malabar
