= Euphrates-class troopship =

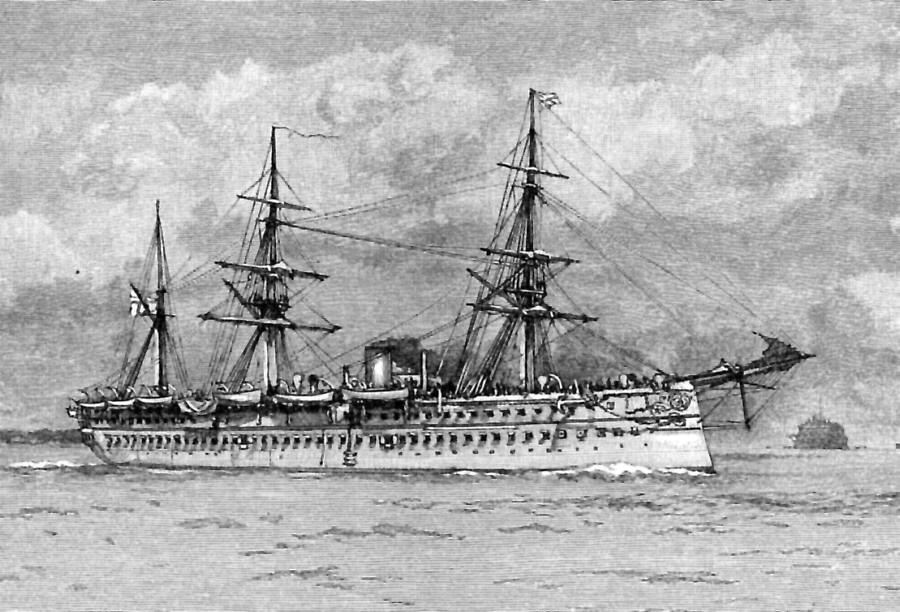
- HMS Jumna

Class overview
- Name: Euphrates-class troopship
- Operators: Royal Navy
- Built: 1865 – 1867
- In service: 1866 – 1922
- Completed: 5
- Retired: 5

General characteristics
- Type: Troopship
- Displacement: 6,211 long tons (6,310.7 t)
- Tons burthen: 4,206 bm; Malabar: 4,189 bm
- Length: 360 ft (109.7 m) (overall)
- Beam: 49 ft 1.5 in (15.0 m)
- Depth of hold: 22 ft 4 in (6.81 m)
- Installed power: Nominal: 700hp; Indicated: Approx 4,000 ihp (3,000 kW) to 5,000 ihp (3,700 kW)
- Propulsion: As built: 2-cylinder horizontal single-expansion trunk engine; Single screw; Except Serapis: 4-cylinder horizontal compound-expansion engine; Single screw
- Sail plan: Barque
- Speed: 11 kn (20 km/h) to 15 kn (28 km/h)
- Armament: Three 4-pounder guns

The Euphrates class was a five-ship class of iron screw troopships built for the Royal Navy during the 1860s. They were used for carrying troops to India, with two of them being later hulked and surviving into the early 20th Century.

== Design ==
The Crimean War and Indian Mutiny in the 1850s both required that large numbers of troops be moved across the globe at short notice. Although for both these conflicts commercial shipping companies were able to fulfil all the immediate requirements, it became apparent that there were severe handicaps to the system; in particular the availability of commercial shipping for trooping could not be guaranteed. It was decided to set up a regular service of Government transports and the Navy was ordered to build five specially designed troopships.

With the Suez Canal due to be opened in 1869, the class was designed within the constraints of the new waterway. Designed to carry an entire battalion of infantry, the result was a magnificent barque-rigged steamer of considerable size; with a top speed of 15 knots, and able to take the direct route via the Suez Canal, they were able to reduce the length of the voyage significantly, but perhaps more importantly, the uncertainty in the time needed to make the journey round the Cape of Good Hope was also reduced.

The five ships were ordered from various British shipbuilders, with Malabar being built to a slightly different and smaller design. They were lightly armed with three 4-pounder guns, and were initially fitted with a single-expansion trunk engine (except Serapis) and single screw, producing 700 nhp. However the engines were refitted on all of these ships during their active careers. Serapis was completed with a 4-cylinder horizontal compound-expansion engine, but was re-engined in 1869 with a 2-cylinder single expansion engine. Jumna's engines were originally 3-cylinder versions, and were modified to the compound type in 1873. The two-cylinder engines of Euphrates and Malabar were also replaced with compound engines in 1873. Crocodile was also re-engined, albeit somewhat later than her sisters. (Note: Winfield does not show a re-engining of Crocodile; this is a misprint and the Errata should be consulted.)

== Career ==
The ships spent most of their active careers conveying British troops to and from the Indian subcontinent, although other voyages were made, most notably to Canada. Obsolete by the mid-1890s, Serapis, Euphrates and Crocodile were sold for breaking up. Malabar became a base ship at Bermuda in 1897, and was renamed HMS Terror in 1901. She was put on the disposal list in 1914 and was sold off in 1918, while Jumna survived as a coal hulk, eventually being sold off in 1922.

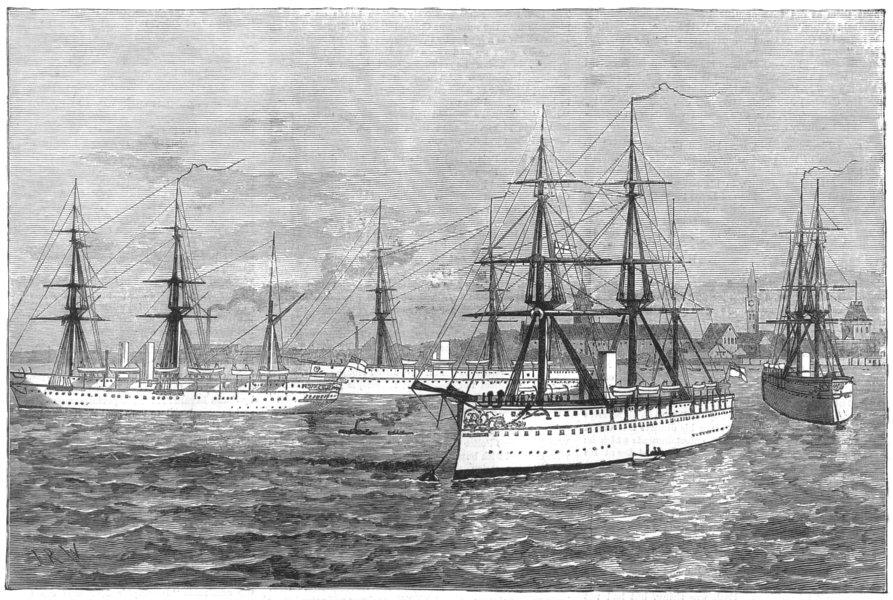
Jumna, Malabar and Euphrates at Bombay c.1880. The vessel on the extreme left is HMS Orontes

== Ships ==
Name	Ship Builder	Ordered	Launched	Fate
Jumna	Palmers Shipbuilding and Iron Company	1865	24 September 1866	Became coal hulk C110 in 1893; Sold as hulk Oceanic in July 1922
Serapis	Thames Ironworks and Shipbuilding Company	1865	26 September 1866	Sold for breaking up on 23 November 1894
Euphrates	Laird Brothers	1865	24 November 1866	Sold on 23 November 1894; Resold for breaking up in August 1895
Malabar	Robert Napier and Sons	1865	8 December 1866 (Note: Although Winfield has 1865, this is a misprint and should read 1866. Copies of the Errata may be requested from the author.)	Became a base ship in 1897; Renamed HMS Terror on 1 May 1901; Sold for breaking up in January 1918.
Crocodile	Money Wigram and Sons	1865	7 January 1867	Sold for breaking up on 11 May 1894.

== Identification ==
All the ships of the class could be distinguished by a different coloured hull band, with Crocodile wearing yellow, Euphrates blue, Jumna red, Malabar black and Serapis green. Jumna’s blue hull band was to become the traditional identification feature for HM troopships.
