= HMS Euphrates (1866) =

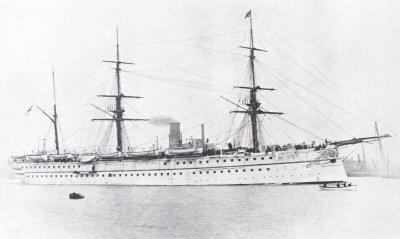

History

United Kingdom
- Name: HMS Euphrates
- Ordered: 1865
- Builder: Laird Brothers of Birkenhead
- Yard number: 325
- Launched: 24 November 1866
- Fate: Sold on 23 November 1894; Resold for breaking in August 1895

General characteristics
- Class & type: Euphrates-class troopship
- Displacement: 6,211 tons
- Tons burthen: 4,173 tons BM
- Length: 360 ft (109.7 m) (overall)
- Beam: 49 ft 1.5 in (15.0 m)
- Depth of hold: 22 ft 4 in (6.81 m)
- Installed power: At build: 5,004 ihp (3,731 kW); After 1873: 1,739 ihp (1,297 kW)
- Propulsion: 2-cylinder horizontal single-expansion (later, compound-expansion) trunk engine; Single screw
- Sail plan: Barque
- Speed: 15 kn (28 km/h)
- Armament: Three 4-pounder guns

HMS Euphrates was an iron-hulled troopship of the Euphrates class. She was designed for the transport of British troops to India, and launched in the River Mersey on 24 November 1866 by Laird Brothers of Birkenhead. She was the fourth and last Royal Navy ship to bear the name.

== Design ==
Euphrates was one of five iron-hulled vessels of the Euphrates class. All five were built to a design of 360 feet (110 m) overall length by about 49 feet (15 m) breadth, although Malabar was very slightly smaller than the rest of the class. They had a single screw, a speed of 14 knots (26 km/h; 16 mph), one funnel, a barque-rig sail plan, three 4-pounder guns, and a white painted hull. Her bow was a "ram bow" which projected forward below the waterline.

== History ==
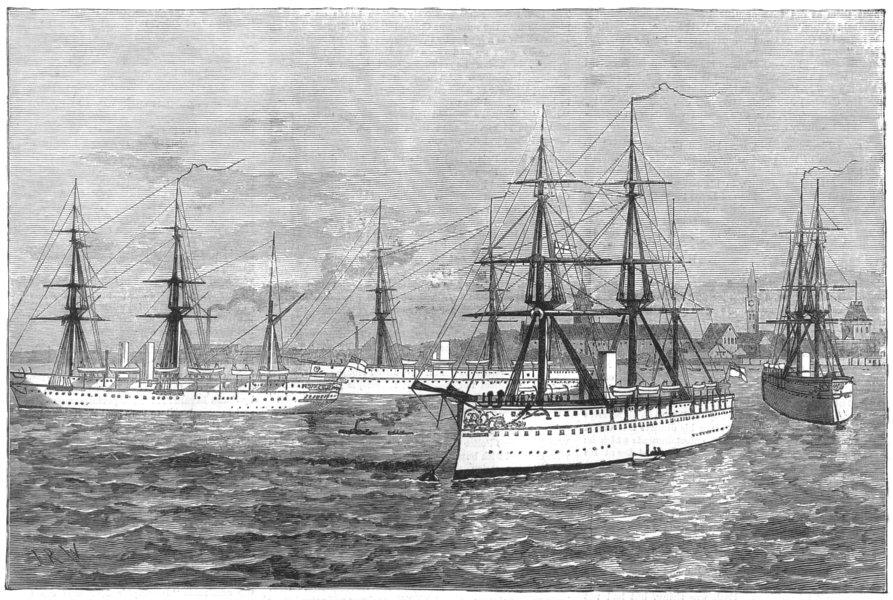
The troopships Orontes, Jumna, Malabar, and Euphrates at Bombay, waiting to bring home troops from the Afghan War in 1880

She was operated by the Royal Navy to transport up to 1,200 troops and family from Portsmouth to Bombay. The return trip after the completion and opening of the Suez Canal took 70 days. Her two-cylinder single-expansion steam engines were replaced in 1873 with a more efficient but less powerful 2-cylinder compound-expansion engine, giving her a reduced top speed under steam of about 11 knots (20 km/h; 13 mph).

On 28 February 1870, she was damaged in a collision with the British merchant ship Bates Family at Bombay, British Raj. On 19 December 1883, she ran aground off Gibraltar. She was refloated the next day. On 6 February 1892, she collided with the German steamer Gutenfels in the Suez Canal. Gutenfels suffered several broken plates and some damage to her upperworks.

== Fate ==
She was sold to I Cohen in Portsmouth on 23 November 1894 and resold to Henry Castle and Son for breaking in August 1895.
