= HMS Jumna (1866) =

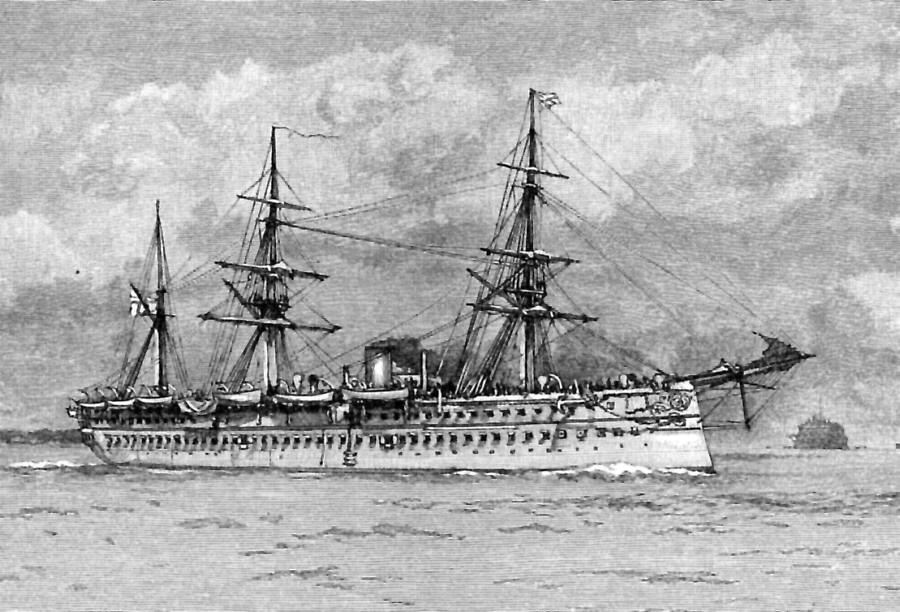
- HMS Jumna about 1885

History

United Kingdom
- Name: HMS Jumna
- Ordered: 1865
- Builder: Palmers Shipbuilding and Iron Company, Hebburn
- Yard number: 190
- Launched: 24 September 1866
- Fate: Became coal hulk C110 in 1893; Sold as hulk Oceanic in July 1922

General characteristics
- Class & type: Euphrates-class troopship
- Displacement: 6,211 tons
- Tons burthen: 4,173 tons BM
- Length: 360 ft (109.7 m) (overall)
- Beam: 49 ft 1.5 in (15.0 m)
- Depth of hold: 22 ft 4 in (6.81 m)
- Installed power: As built: 4,894 ihp (3,649 kW); From 1873: 3,044 ihp (2,270 kW)
- Propulsion: 3-cylinder horizontal single-expansion steam (later, compound-expansion) steam engine; Single screw
- Sail plan: Barque-rigged
- Speed: 15 kn (28 km/h)
- Armament: Three 4-pounder guns

HMS Jumna was a Euphrates-class troopship launched at Palmers Shipbuilding and Iron Company at Hebburn on 24 September 1866. She was the third vessel of the Royal Navy to carry the name.

== Design ==
Jumna was one of five iron-hulled vessels of the Euphrates class. All five were built to a design of 360 ft overall length by about 49 ft breadth, although Malabar was very slightly smaller than the rest of the class. They had a single screw, a speed of 14 knots, one funnel, a barque-rig sail plan, three 4-pounder guns, and a white painted hull. Her bow was a "ram bow" which projected forward below the waterline.

She was commissioned jointly by the British Admiralty and the Indian government.

== Identification ==
The Euphrates-class troopships could each be identified by a different coloured hull band. The Jumna's hull band was red. The blue hull band of her sister Euphrates became the standard for all HM Troopships.

== History ==
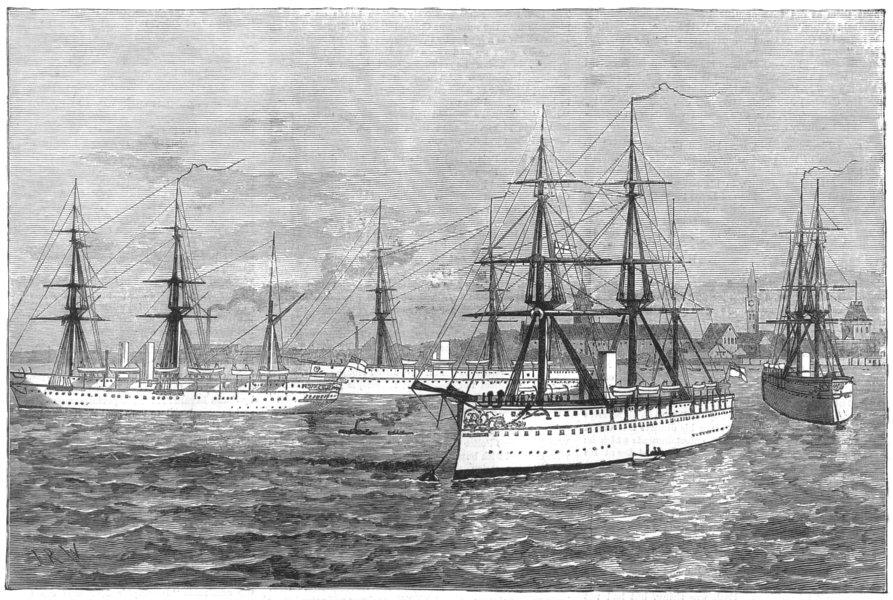
Troop-Ships Orontes, Jumna, Malabar, and Euphrates at Bombay, waiting to bring Home Troops from the Afghan War in 1880

She spent most of her active career conveying British troops to and from the Indian subcontinent. In 1870 she transported The Connaught Rangers from India back to Britain.

In 1873 her Maudslay, Sons and Field 3-cylinder single-expansion steam engine was modified at Portsmouth by the replacement of one low-pressure cylinder with a smaller, high-pressure one, giving her a more efficient compound-expansion engine, albeit with less power and a new top speed of 13 knots (24 km/h).

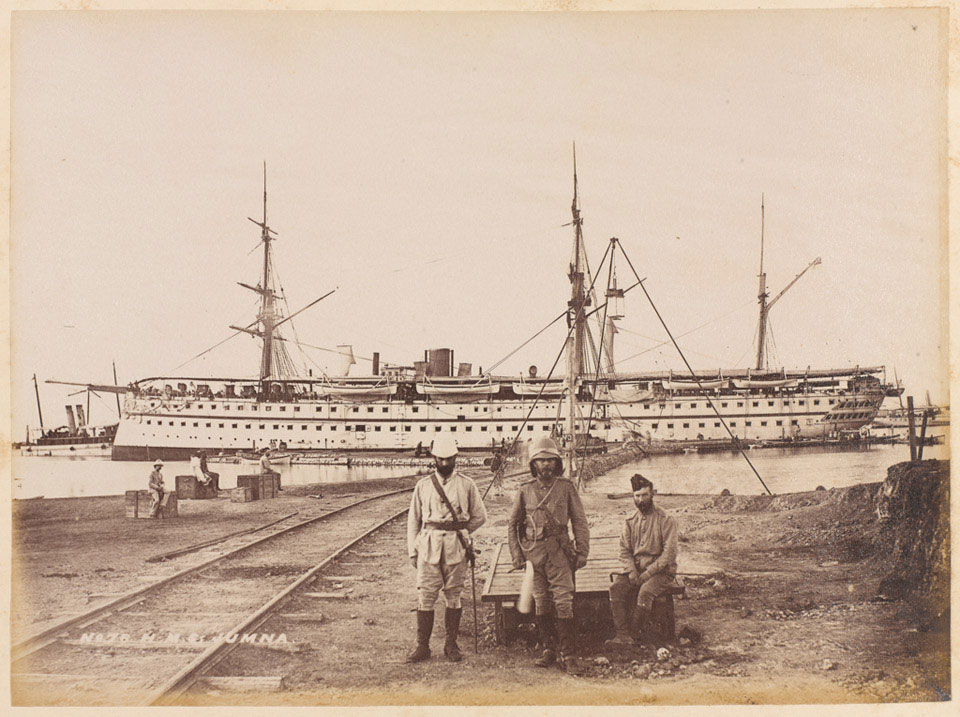
Jumna circa 1884 on operations for the 1st Sudan War

On 25 August 1883 she collided with HMS Minotaur at Plymouth and ran aground. She shipped back the York and Lancaster Regiment to England from Sudan 29 March to April 1884 In March 1886 she collided with the German steamship Hesperia in the Suez Canal but was not damaged.

There are references among Royal Navy Seamen's Services, 1848-1939 that HMS Jumna was "Depot ship" in Bombay in 1909 and used as training vessel.

== Fate ==
In December 1902 she was still listed as HMS Jumna as she relieved HMS Caledonia as training ship for boys at Queensferry, taking the crew from that ship. A chart showing the moorings in the Firth of Forth adjacent to the Rosyth Naval Base in September 1918 has a mooring marked 'Jumna', and it is possible that this was HMS Jumna, serving as a coal hulk for the fleet.

She became the coal hulk C110 and was sold as the hulk Oceanic in July 1922.
