= HMS Northumberland (1866) =

1866 ship

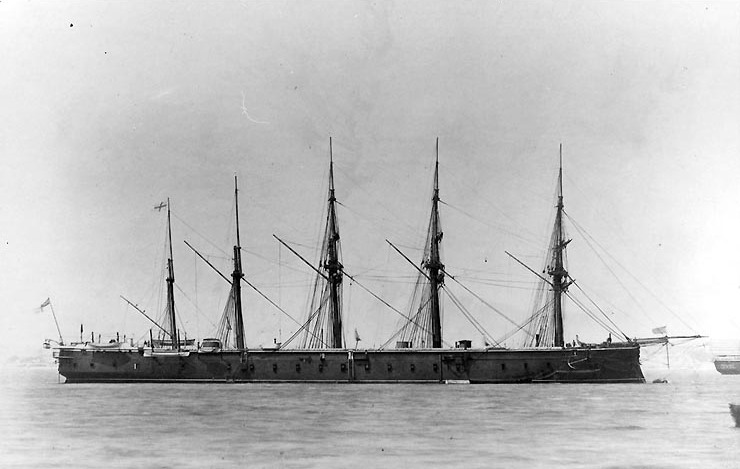
- Northumberland in her original 5-masted configuration

History

United Kingdom
- Name: HMS Northumberland
- Namesake: Northumberland
- Ordered: 2 September 1861
- Builder: Millwall Iron Works, Millwall, London
- Cost: £444,256
- Laid down: 10 October 1861
- Launched: 17 April 1866
- Completed: 8 October 1868
- Commissioned: October 1868
- Decommissioned: 1898
- Out of service: Hulked, 1909
- Renamed: Acheron, 1898; C.8, 1909; C.68, 1926; Stedmound, 1927
- Reclassified: Training ship, 1898
- Stricken: 1927
- Fate: Sold, 1927; Scrapped, 1935

General characteristics (as completed)
- Class & type: Minotaur-class armoured frigate
- Displacement: 10,584 long tons (10,754 t)
- Length: 400 ft 4 in (122.0 m) p/p
- Beam: 59 ft 5 in (18.1 m)
- Draught: 27 ft 9 in (8.5 m)
- Installed power: 6,558 ihp (4,890 kW); 10 rectangular fire-tube boilers
- Propulsion: 1 shaft, 1 Trunk steam engine
- Sail plan: 5-masted
- Speed: 14 knots (26 km/h; 16 mph)
- Range: 2,825 nmi (5,232 km; 3,251 mi) at 10 knots (19 km/h; 12 mph)
- Complement: 800
- Armament: 4 × 9-inch (230 mm) rifled muzzle-loading guns; 22 × 8-inch (200 mm) rifled muzzle-loaders; 2 × 7-inch (180 mm) rifled muzzle-loaders
- Armour: Belt: 4.5–5.5 in (114–140 mm); Bulkheads: 5.5 in (140 mm); Battery: 5.5 in (140 mm)

HMS Northumberland was the last of the three Minotaur-class armoured frigates built for the Royal Navy during the 1860s. She had a different armour scheme and heavier armament than her sister ships, and was generally regarded as a half-sister to the other ships of the class. The ship spent her career with the Channel Squadron and occasionally served as a flagship. Northumberland was placed in reserve in 1890 and became a training ship in 1898. She was converted into a coal hulk in 1910 [see below] and sold in 1927, although the ship was not scrapped until 1935.

== Design and description ==
The Minotaur-class armoured frigates (Note: Ironclad is the all-encompassing term for armoured warships of this period. Armoured frigates were basically designed for the same role as traditional wooden frigates, but this later changed as the size and expense of these ships forced them to be used in the line of battle.) were essentially enlarged versions of the ironclad HMS Achilles with heavier armament, armour, and more powerful engines. They retained the broadside ironclad layout of their predecessor, but their sides were fully armoured to protect the 50 guns they were designed to carry. Their plough-shaped ram was also more prominent than that of Achilles.

Northumberland was 400 feet 4 inches (122.0 m) long between perpendiculars and had a beam of 58 feet 5 inches (17.8 m) and a draught of 27 feet 9 inches (8.5 m). The ship displaced 10,584 long tons (10,754 t) and had a tonnage of 6,621 tons burthen. Her hull was subdivided by 15 watertight transverse bulkheads and had a double bottom underneath the engine and boiler rooms. The ship was considered "a steady gun platform, able to maintain her speed in a seaway and satisfactory in manoeuvre". She was authorized a crew of 705 officers and ratings, but actually carried 800 men.

=== Propulsion ===
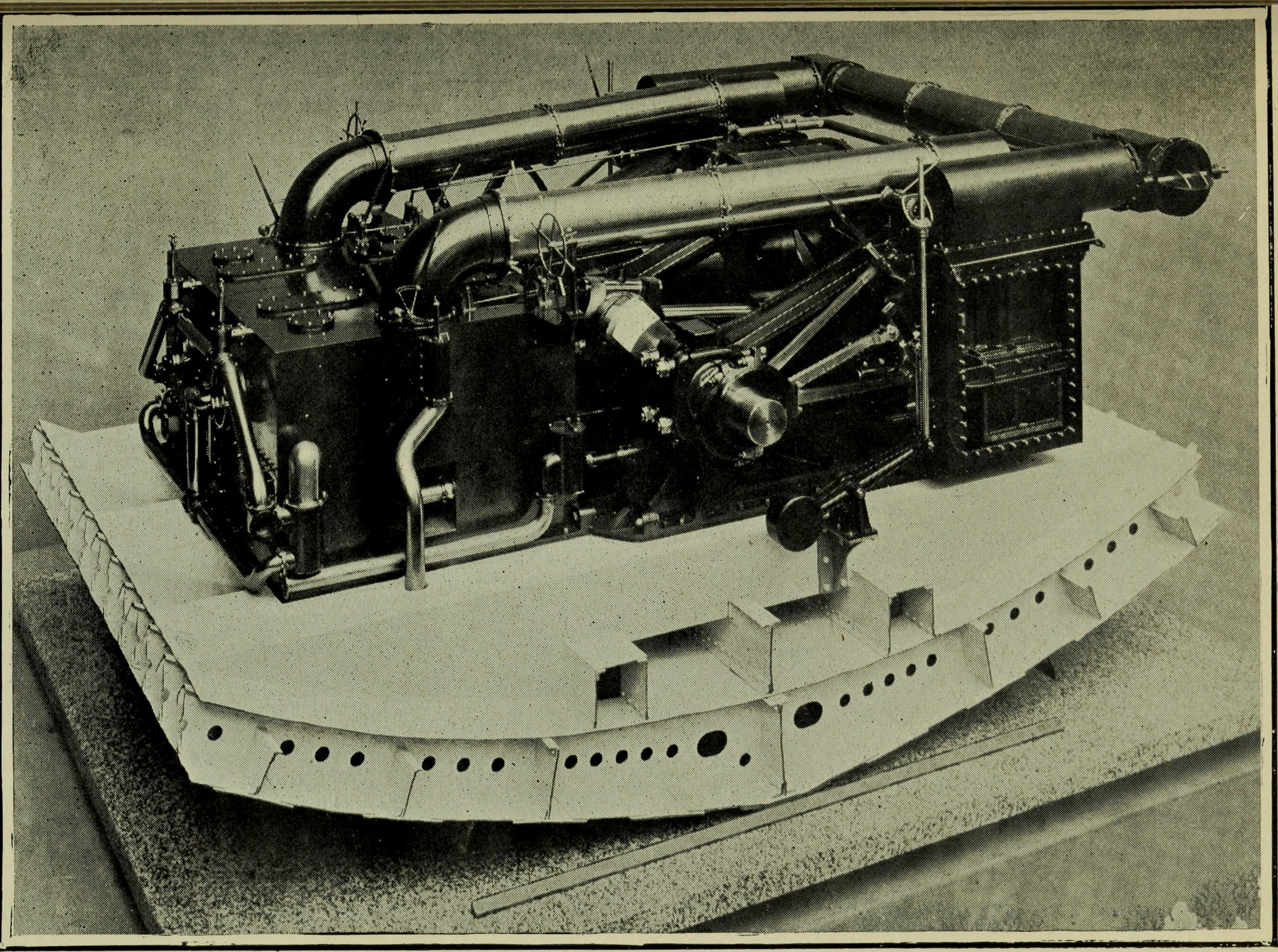
Model of her engines

Northumberland had a two-cylinder trunk steam engine, made by John Penn and Sons, driving a single propeller using steam provided by 10 rectangular fire-tube boilers. It produced a total of 6,558 indicated horsepower (4,890 kW) during the ship's sea trials on 15 September 1868 and Northumberland had a maximum speed of 14.1 knots (26.1 km/h; 16.2 mph). The ships normally carried 750 long tons (760 t) of coal, but had a maximum capacity of 1,400 long tons (1,400 t), enough to steam 2,825 nautical miles (5,232 km; 3,251 mi) at 10 knots (19 km/h; 12 mph).

Originally designed with three masts, Northumberland was fitted with five masts until her 1875–79 refit when two were removed and she was re-rigged as a barque. Northumberland only made 7 knots (13 km/h; 8.1 mph) under sail, mainly because the ship's propeller could only be disconnected and not hoisted up into the stern of the ship to reduce drag, the worst speed of any ironclad of her era. Admiral George A. Ballard described the Minotaur-class ships as "the dullest performers under canvas of the whole masted fleet of their day, and no ships ever carried so much dress to so little purpose."

=== Armament ===
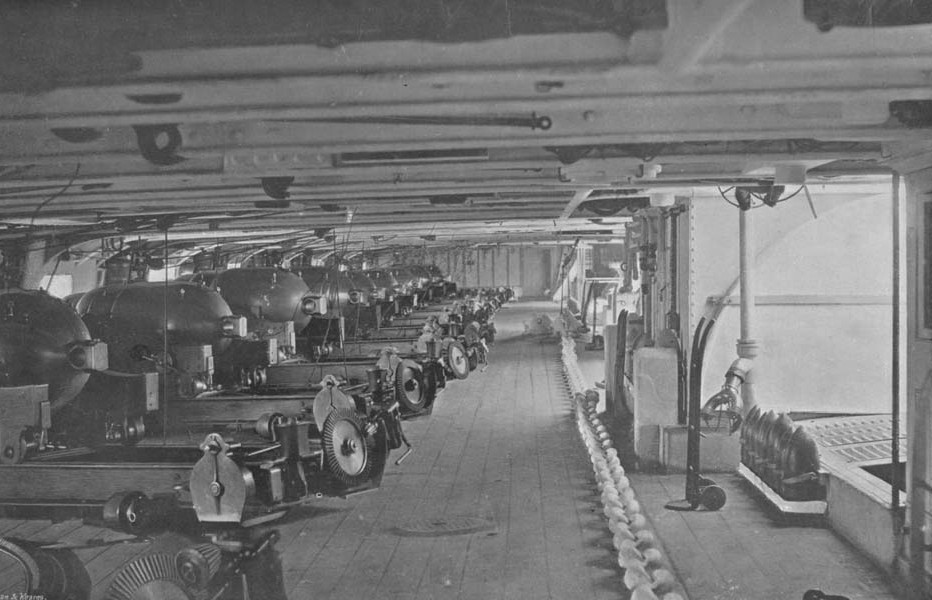
Northumberland's gun deck, showing her eight-inch guns

Unlike her half-sisters, Northumberland was armed with a mix of seven-inch (178 mm), eight-inch (203 mm), and nine-inch (229 mm) rifled muzzle-loading guns. All 4 nine-inch and 18 eight-inch were mounted on the main deck while 4 eight-inch guns were fitted on the upper deck as chase guns. Both seven-inch guns were mounted in the stern on the main deck, also as chase guns.

The nine-inch gun was credited with the ability to penetrate 11.3 inches (287 mm) of wrought iron armour at the muzzle. The eight-inch gun could penetrate 9.6-inch (244 mm) of armour and the seven-inch gun could penetrate 7.7 inches (196 mm).

Northumberland was partially rearmed in 1875 with an armament of 7 nine-inch guns, 4 on the main deck, 2 forward chase guns and 1 rear chase gun. Two eight-inch guns replaced the seven-inchers on the main deck at the stern; the other 18 eight-inch guns remained where they were. In 1886 two six inches (152 mm) breech-loading guns replaced two eight-inch guns. Six quick-firing (QF) 4.7-inch (120-mm) guns, 10 QF 3-pounder Hotchkiss guns, and six machine guns were later added.

=== Armour ===
Unlike her half-sisters, the entire side of Northumberland's hull was not covered with wrought iron armour. To compensate for the additional weight of her armament, only her battery was protected above the main deck. The ship was fitted with a complete waterline armour belt that tapered from 4.5 inches (114 mm) at the ends to 5.5 inches (140 mm) amidships. The armour extended 5 feet 9 inches (1.8 m) below the waterline. The sides of the battery were 184.5 feet (56.2 m) long and it was protected by 5.5-inch armour on all sides, including transverse bulkheads fore and aft of the guns. The two forward chase guns on the upper deck were also protected by armoured bulkheads, but the stern chase guns on that same deck were entirely unprotected. The armour was backed by 10 inches (254 mm) of teak. The ship also had a conning tower protected by 4.5-inch armour plates.

== Construction and service ==
Northumberland, named after the ceremonial county, was ordered on 2 September 1861 from the Millwall Ironworks. She was laid down on 10 October 1861 at its shipyard in Millwall, London. She was altered while on the building slip after Sir Edward Reed succeeded Isaac Watts as Chief Constructor. Unlike her half-sisters, the ship spent five years on the stocks before she was ready to be launched, partially due to frequent changes in design, although Northumberland was much closer to completion. The additional weight caused her stick for an hour on the slipway before she slid halfway down with her stern only supported by air, threatening to buckle the ship. Efforts by hydraulic jacks and tugboats failed to get her into the water on the next spring tide failed, but the use of pontoons on 17 April 1866 proved successful. Her builders went into bankruptcy while the ship was being launched and the liquidators seized Northumberland as a company asset once she was in the water. Eight months passed before the Admiralty could take possession and begin fitting out the ship. She was commissioned in October 1868 and completed on 8 October for a cost a total of £444,256.

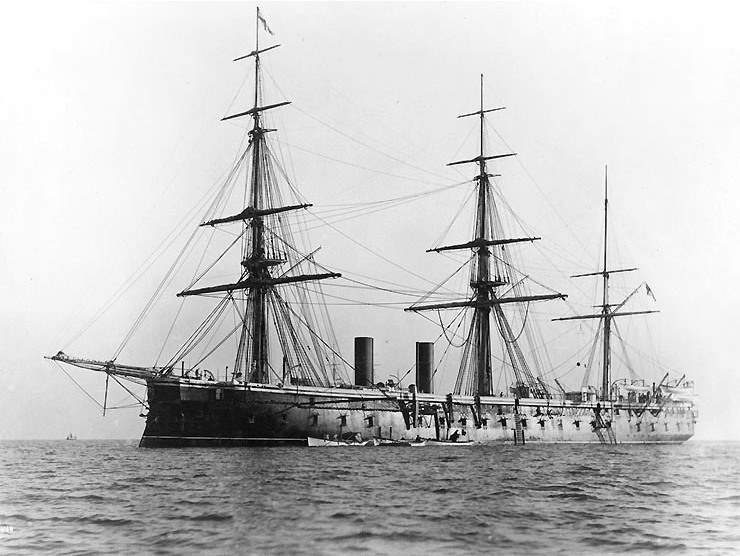
Northumberland in three-masted configuration, 1890

The ship's first posting was to the Channel Squadron, where she remained until 1873. Her first captain, Roderick Dew, had all of her yards painted black so that she could be visually distinguished from her half-sisters, whose yards were white. During this time she helped her half-sister Agincourt tow a floating drydock from England to Madeira where it would be picked up by Warrior and Black Prince and taken to Bermuda. The ships departed the Nore on 23 June 1869, loaded down with 500 long tons (510 t) of coal stowed in bags on their gun decks, and transferred the floating dock 11 days later after an uneventful voyage.

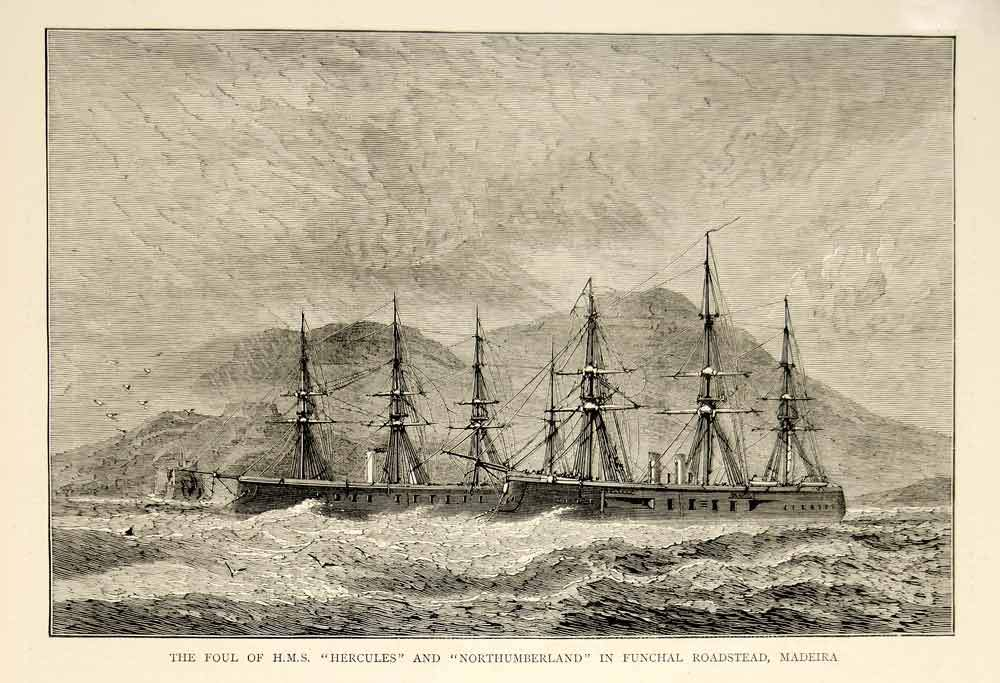
The Foul of HMS 'Hercules' and 'Northumberland' in Funchal Roadstead, Madeira

She was anchored at Funchal, Madeira, on Christmas Day 1872, when a storm parted her anchor chain and the ship drifted onto the ram bow of the ironclad Hercules. Northumberland was seriously damaged below the waterline, with one compartment flooded, though she was able to steam to Malta for repairs.

While her half-sister Minotaur, normally flagship of the Channel Squadron, was refitting in 1873–75, Agincourt, normally the flagship of the fleet second-in-command, replaced her as flagship and Northumberland became flagship of the second-in-command until Minotaur's return to duty. She served as the flagship for Rear Admirals George Hancock and Lord John Hay. Northumberland received her own refit and rearmament from 1875 to 1879 and rejoined the Channel Squadron upon its completion. The ship was paid off in 1885 for another refit and became the flagship of Vice Admirals Sir William Hewett and John Baird, successive commanders of the Channel Squadron, upon her completion in 1887.

Northumberland was assigned to the 1st Reserve Squadron at the Isle of Portland in 1890–91 and then at Devonport from 1891 to 1898. She was hulked in 1898 as a stokers' training ship at the Nore, and renamed Acheron on 1 January 1904.

She struck her pennant on 31 March 1910, following the transfer of the second-class stokers berthed in her to Chatham Naval Barracks, and thereafter served as a coal hulk at Invergordon, initially designated C.8, she was renamed C.68 in 1926. The ship was sold in 1927, but was resold and renamed as Stedmound for service at Dakar until she was scrapped in 1935.

== Relics ==
Two large 1870s scale half-models of the ship are at the Museum of London Docklands.
