= Minotaur-class ironclad =

Class of Royal Navy frigates

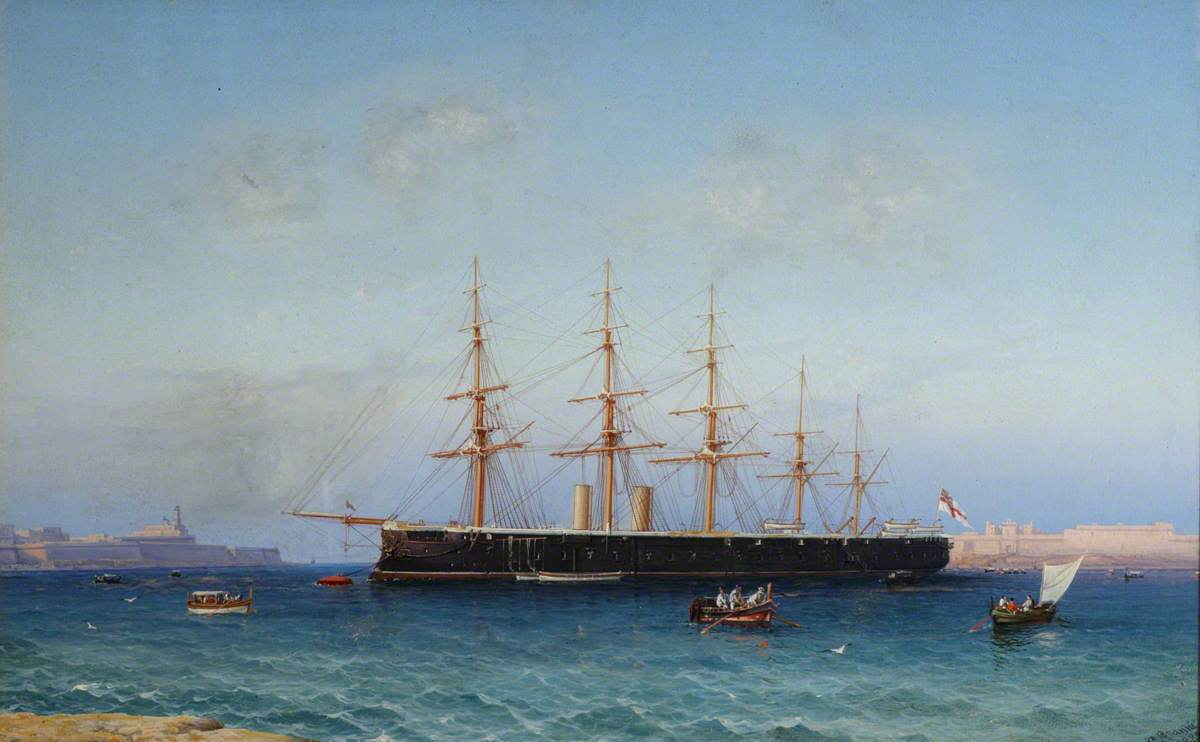
- Agincourt at Malta

Class overview
- Name: Minotaur class
- Operators: Royal Navy
- Preceded by: HMS Achilles
- Succeeded by: Prince Consort class
- Completed: 3
- Scrapped: 3

General characteristics
- Class & type: Armoured frigate
- Displacement: 10,627 long tons (10,798 t)
- Length: 407 ft 0 in (124.05 m) (o/a)
- Beam: 59 ft 6 in (18.1 m)
- Draught: 27 ft 9 in (8.5 m)
- Installed power: 10 fire-tube boilers; 6,949 ihp (5,182 kW)
- Propulsion: 1 shaft, 1 trunk steam engine
- Sail plan: 5-masted
- Speed: 14 knots (26 km/h; 16 mph)
- Range: 1,500 nmi (2,800 km; 1,700 mi) at 7.5 knots (13.9 km/h; 8.6 mph)
- Complement: 800 actual
- Armament: 4 × 9-inch (229 mm) rifled muzzle-loading (RML) guns; 24 × 7-inch (178 mm) RMLs
- Armour: Belt: 4.5–5.5 in (114–140 mm); Bulkheads: 5.5 in (140 mm)

The Minotaur-class ironclads consisted of three armoured frigates built for the Royal Navy during the 1860s. They were enlarged versions of HMS Achilles with heavier armament, thicker armour, and more powerful engines. The ships of this class were unique among ironclad warships in possessing on completion five masts, named fore-, second-, main-, fourth- and mizzen-.

== Design ==
The Minotaur-class ironclads were the final class of the first generation of British ironclads that had begun with HMS Warrior in 1860. The new ships were in many respects an enlarged version of Achilles, which was in turn an improvement upon the Warrior design.

They were originally intended to mount forty Armstrong 110-pounder breech-loading guns on the main deck, with ten more on pivot mountings on the upper deck. The failure of these guns in service led to a complete re-evaluation of their armament, with a concomitant delay in the arming of the whole class. The ships were armed with a combination of 9-inch muzzle-loading rifles (MLR) on metal carriages and 7-inch MLRs on rope-worked carriages. In a moderate swell these 7-inch guns were virtually unworkable, making the Minotaurs both the heaviest and the worst armed of the Victorian battleships.

=== Characteristics ===
The ships of the Minotaur class were 400 feet 3 inches (122.00 m) long between perpendiculars and 407 ft (124 m) long overall, and they were fitted with a ram bow. They had a beam of 59 ft 6 in (18.14 m) and a draught of 27 ft 9 in (8.46 m). Their displacement varied from 10,600 to 10,784 long tons (10,770 to 10,957 t), the lightest being Agincourt and the heaviest being Northumberland. Their hulls were subdivided into sixteen watertight compartments, and they had a double bottom underneath the engine and boiler rooms. The ships had a crew of 800 officers and ratings.

Each ship's propulsion system consisted of a 2-cylinder marine steam engines with steam provided by ten coal-fired fire-tube boilers, which were vented through a pair of funnels. Their engines provided a top speed from 14.13 to 14.8 knots (26.17 to 27.41 km/h; 16.26 to 17.03 mph) from 6,545 to 6,868 indicated horsepower (4,881 to 5,121 kW); of the three, Northumberland was the slowest and Agincourt was the fastest. The ships carried 750 long tons (760 t) of coal, enough to steam for 1,500 nautical miles (2,800 km; 1,700 mi) at 7.5 knots (13.9 km/h; 8.6 mph). The Minotaur-class ships were the largest warships to rely on a single screw for propulsion.

To supplement the steam engines, the ships were fitted with a five-masted full-ship rig. Minotaur was completed with a square rig on the first four masts and a spanker on the fifth. During sea trials, this arrangement was found to be unsatisfactory, so the yards were removed from the fourth mast. The other two ships were completed with the modified rig. The total sail area was 32,377 square feet (3,007.9 m^{2}). In service, the ships proved to be fairly poor sailers, making around 9 to 10 knots (17 to 19 km/h; 10 to 12 mph) under sail alone. This was primarily the result of the ships' screws, which could be disconnected from the engines to rotate freely, but they could not be retracted, so they still imparted drag on the hull. The funnels could be partially withdrawn into the hull to reduce wind resistance, however. The ships also handled poorly, though they had good seakeeping qualities.

The first two ships—Minotaur and Agincourt—were armed with a battery that consisted of four RML 9 in (229 mm) rifled guns, twenty-four RML 7 in (178 mm) rifled guns, and eight 24-pounder smoothbore guns. Northumberland received a slightly different armament that included four RML 9-inch guns, twenty-two RML 8 in (203 mm) rifled guns, and two RML 7-inch guns. Most of the ships' guns were carried on the broadside, but four were carried as chase guns in the bow and stern.

Armour protection consisted of 5.5 in (140 mm) of iron plate on the belt and above along the length of the battery. On either end of the ships, the side armour was reduced to 4.5 in (110 mm) thickness. The side armour extended from upper-deck level down to 5 feet 9 inches (1.75 m) below the waterline. Transverse bulkheads that were 5.5 in thick connected the forward end of the battery sides, which extended far enough to protect the forward chase guns. All of the side armour was backed by 10 in (254 mm) of timber. Because Northumberland's battery had fewer guns, its armoured battery could be shortened. Unlike her sisters, she also received an armoured conning tower that had 4.5 in of iron plate on the sides.

== Ships ==
Construction data
Ship	Original Name	Builder	Laid down	Launched	Completed
Minotaur	Elephant	Thames Ironworks and Shipbuilding Company	12 September 1861	12 December 1863	19 December 1868
Agincourt	Captain	Laird, Son & Co.	30 October 1861	27 March 1865	1 June 1867
Northumberland	—	Millwall Iron Works	10 October 1861	17 April 1866	8 October 1868
