= HMS Minotaur (1863) =

Lead ship of the British Minotaur-class armoured frigates

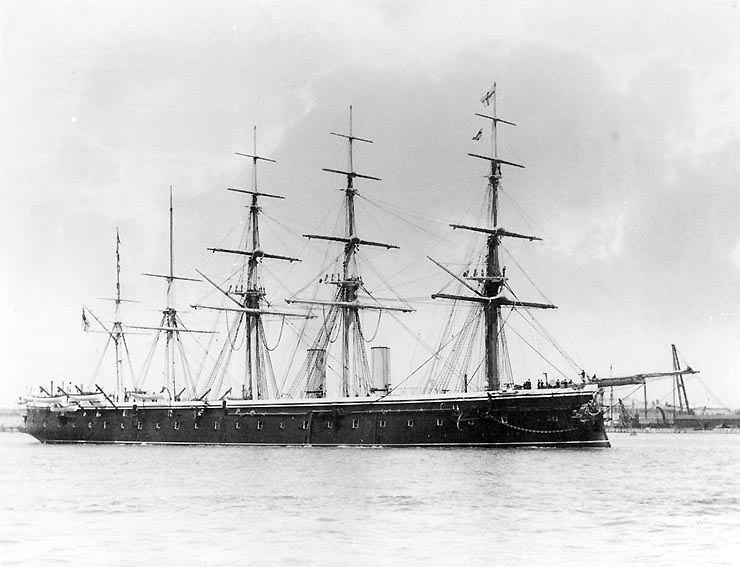
- Minotaur at anchor

History

United Kingdom
- Name: HMS Minotaur
- Namesake: Minotaur
- Ordered: 2 September 1861
- Builder: Thames Ironworks and Shipbuilding Company
- Laid down: 12 September 1861
- Launched: 12 December 1863
- Completed: 1 June 1867
- Commissioned: April 1867
- Fate: Sold for scrap, 1922

General characteristics (as completed)
- Class & type: Minotaur-class armoured frigate
- Displacement: 10,627 long tons (10,798 t)
- Length: 400 ft (121.9 m) between perpendiculars; 407 ft 0 in (124.05 m) overall
- Beam: 59 ft 6 in (18.1 m)
- Draught: 27 ft 9 in (8.5 m)
- Installed power: 6,949 ihp (5,182 kW)
- Propulsion: 1 shaft, 1 Trunk steam engine; 10 rectangular fire-tube boilers
- Sail plan: 5-masted
- Speed: 14 knots (26 km/h; 16 mph)
- Range: 1,500 nmi (2,800 km; 1,700 mi) at 7.5 kn (13.9 km/h; 8.6 mph)
- Complement: 800 actual
- Armament: 4 × 9-inch (230 mm) rifled muzzle-loading guns; 24 × 7-inch (180 mm) rifled muzzle-loaders
- Armour: Belt: 4.5–5.5 in (114–140 mm); Bulkheads: 5.5 in (140 mm)

HMS Minotaur was the lead ship of the Minotaur-class armoured frigates built for the Royal Navy during the 1860s. Minotaur took nearly four years between her launching and commissioning because she was used for evaluations of her armament and different sailing rigs.

The ship spent the bulk of her active career as flagship of the Channel Squadron, including during Queen Victoria's Golden Jubilee Fleet Review in 1887. She became a training ship in 1893 and was then hulked in 1905 when she became part of the training school at Harwich. Minotaur was renamed several times before being sold for scrap in 1922 and broken up the following year.

== Design and description ==
The Minotaur-class armoured frigates (Note: Ironclad is the all-encompassing term for armoured warships of this period. Armoured frigates were basically designed for the same role as traditional wooden frigates, but this later changed as the size and expense of these ships forced them to be used in the line of battle.) were essentially enlarged versions of the ironclad HMS Achilles with heavier armament, armour, and more powerful engines. They retained the broadside ironclad layout of their predecessor, but their sides were fully armoured to protect the 50 guns they were designed to carry. Each was equipped with a plough-shaped ram that was also more prominent than that of Achilles.

The Minotaur-class ships were 400 feet (121.9 m) long between perpendiculars and 411 feet (125.3 m) long overall. They had a beam of 58 feet 6 inches (17.8 m) and a draft of 26 feet 10 inches (8.2 m). The ships displaced 10,627 long tons (10,798 t). The hull was subdivided by 15 watertight transverse bulkheads and had a double bottom underneath the engine and boiler rooms.

Minotaur was considered "an excellent sea-boat and a steady gun platform, but unhandy under steam and practically unmanageable under sail" as built. Steam-powered steering improved her manoeuvring qualities significantly when it was installed in 1875 and she was judged "one of our very best manoeuvrers we have in the Navy" by Vice Admiral Philip Colomb in 1890. The ship's steadiness was partially a result of her metacentric height of 3.87 feet (1.2 m).

=== Propulsion ===
Minotaur had a two-cylinder trunk steam engine, made by John Penn and Sons, that drove a single 24-foot (7.3 m) propeller. Ten rectangular fire-tube boilers provided steam to the engine at a working pressure of 25 psi (172 kPa; 2 kgf/cm^{2}). The engine produced a total of 6,949 indicated horsepower (5,182 kW) during the ship's sea trials on 10 May 1867 and Minotaur had a maximum speed of 14.33 knots (26.54 km/h; 16.49 mph). The ships carried 750 long tons (760 t) of coal, enough to steam 1,500 nmi (2,800 km; 1,700 mi) at 7.5 knots (13.9 km/h; 8.6 mph). Minotaur was reboilered in 1893 and reached 14 knots (26 km/h; 16 mph) with 6,288 ihp (4,689 kW).

The ship had five masts and a sail area of 32,377 square feet (3,008 m^{2}). Because her propeller could only be disconnected and not hoisted up into the stern of the ship to reduce drag, Minotaur only made 9.5 knots (17.6 km/h; 10.9 mph) under sail. Both funnels were semi-retractable to reduce wind resistance while under sail. Admiral George A. Ballard described Minotaur and her sisters as "the dullest performers under canvas of the whole masted fleet of their day, and no ships ever carried so much dress to so little purpose." In 1893–4, after her withdrawal from active service, Minotaur had two masts removed and was re-rigged as a barque.

=== Armament ===
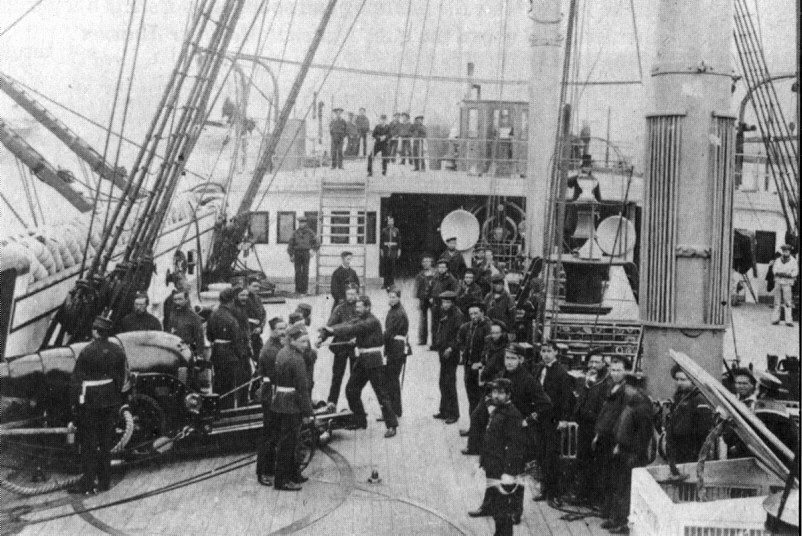
Minotaur's deck in the late 1860s. A 7-inch muzzle-loading rifle on a wrought iron pivot gun carriage is at lower left.

The armament of the Minotaur-class ships was intended to be 40 rifled 110-pounder breech-loading guns on the main deck and 10 more on the upper deck on pivot mounts. The gun was a new design from Armstrong, but proved a failure a few years after its introduction. The gun was withdrawn before any were received by any of the Minotaur-class ships. They were armed, instead, with a mix of seven-inch (178 mm) and nine-inch (229 mm) rifled muzzle-loading guns. All four nine-inch and 20 seven-inch guns were mounted on the main deck while four seven-inch guns were fitted on the upper deck as chase guns. The ship also received eight brass howitzers for use as saluting guns. The gun ports were 30 inches (0.8 m) wide which allowed each gun to fire 30° fore and aft of the beam.

The shell of the 14-calibre 9-inch gun weighed 254 pounds (115.2 kg) while the gun itself weighed 12 long tons (12 t). It had a muzzle velocity of 1,420 ft/s (430 m/s) and was credited with the ability to penetrate a 11.3 inches (287 mm) of wrought iron armour at the muzzle. The 16-calibre 7-inch gun weighed 6.5 long tons (6.6 t) and fired a 112-pound (50.8 kg) shell. It was credited with the ability to penetrate 7.7-inch (196 mm) armour.

Minotaur was rearmed in 1875 with a uniform armament of 17 nine-inch guns, 14 on the main deck, two forward chase guns and one rear chase gun. The gun ports had to be enlarged to accommodate the larger guns by hand, at a cost of £250 each. About 1883 two 6 inches (152 mm) breech-loading guns replaced two 9-inch muzzle-loading guns. Four quick-firing (QF) 4.7-inch (120-mm) guns, eight QF 3-pounder Hotchkiss guns, eight machine guns and two torpedo tubes were installed in 1891–2.

=== Armour ===
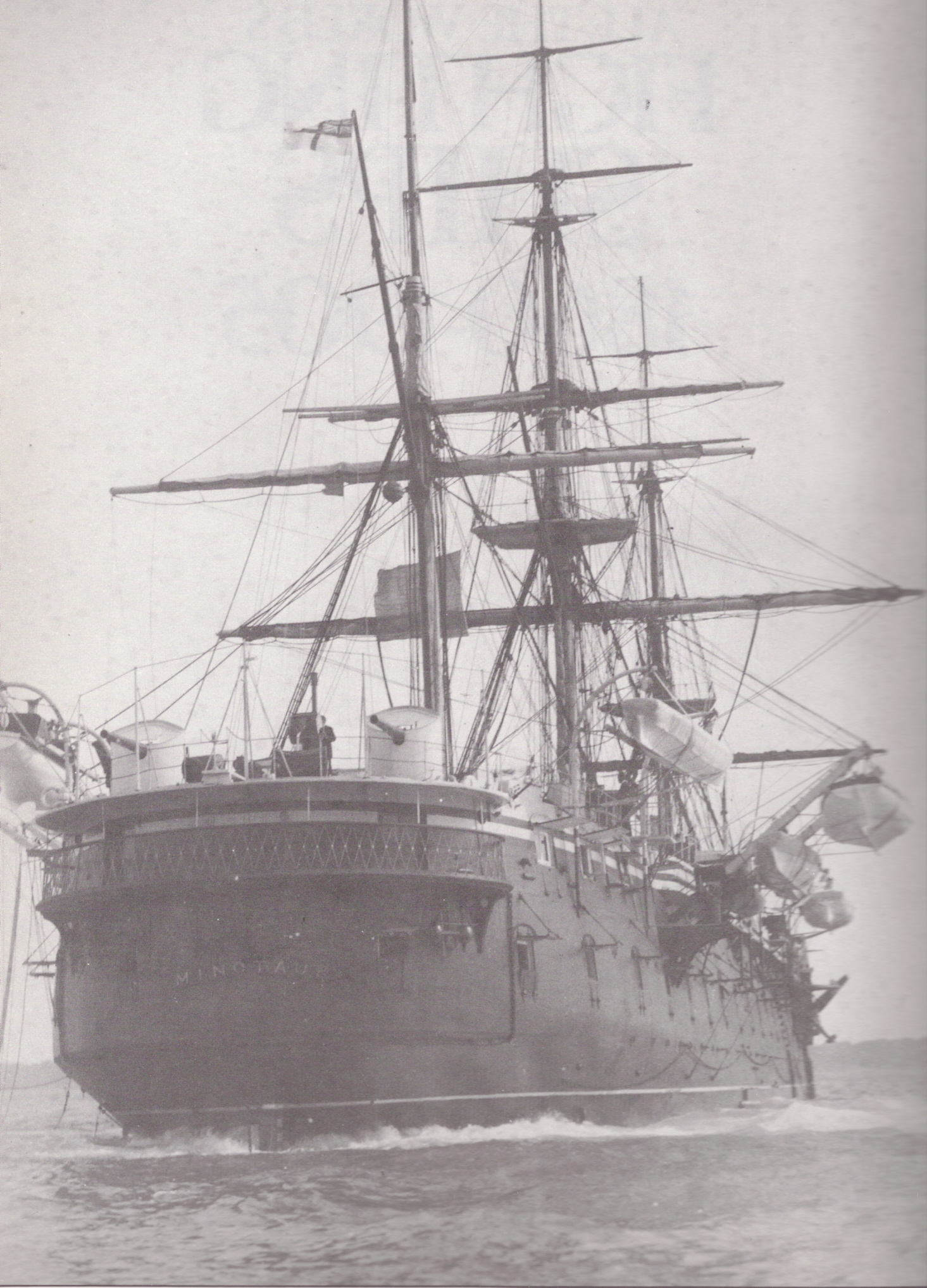
A stern view of Minotaur; note the two prominent 4.7-inch guns on the poop deck

The entire side of the Minotaur-class ships was protected by wrought iron armour that tapered from 4.5 inches (114 mm) at the ends to 5.5 inches (140 mm) amidships, except for a section of the bow between the upper and main decks. The armour extended 5 feet 9 inches (1.8 m) below the waterline. A single 5.5-inch transverse bulkhead protected the forward chase guns on the upper deck. The armour was backed by 10 inches (254 mm) of teak.

== Construction and service ==
HMS Minotaur was originally ordered on 2 September 1861 as HMS Elephant, in honour of the ship once commanded by Nelson seventy years before, but her name was changed to Minotaur during construction. She was laid down on 12 September 1861 by the Thames Ironworks in Blackwall, London. She was launched on 12 December 1863, commissioned in April 1867 and completed on 1 June 1867. The lengthy delay in completion was due to frequent changes in design details, and experiments with her armament and with her sailing rig. The ship cost a total of £478,855.

Minotaur finally commissioned in Portsmouth as the flagship of the Channel Squadron, a position which she retained until 1873. In 1872 the ship nearly rammed the ironclad HMS Bellerophon as they were leaving Belfast Lough. Minotaur lost her bowsprit and fore topgallant mast, but Bellerophon only suffered some minor flooding. She paid off for a long refit in 1873 and resumed her position in 1875 when she rejoined the Channel Squadron. Minotaur became the first ship in the Royal Navy to receive a permanent installation of an electric searchlight in 1876.

In 1882, she took part in naval operations off Egypt during the British invasion of the country, arriving in Alexandria just after the British squadron there had bombarded the port's defences on 11 July. She remained on active service off Egypt, sometimes shelling shore positions, until October 1882 when she sailed for Malta.

On 24 December 1886, she collided with HMS Monarch in the Tagus, severely damaging HMS Monarch.

On 28 February 1887, she rescued the passengers and crew of the British steamship Valparaiso, which was wrecked on a reef off Vigo, Spain. The ship was the flagship of Vice Admiral Sir William Hewett, who had earned the Victoria Cross in the siege of Sevastopol in 1854, during Queen Victoria's Golden Jubilee Fleet Review on 23 July 1887. Minotaur was paid off at the end of 1887 in Portsmouth and assigned to the Reserve until 1893 when she became a training ship at Portland. She was renamed HMS Boscawen II in March 1904 and transferred in 1905 to Harwich as part of the training school HMS Ganges. The ship was renamed 11 June 1906 as HMS Ganges and then to Ganges II on 25 April 1908. She was sold on 30 January 1922 for scrap.
