= HMS Bellerophon (1865) =

British naval ironclad (1866–1914)

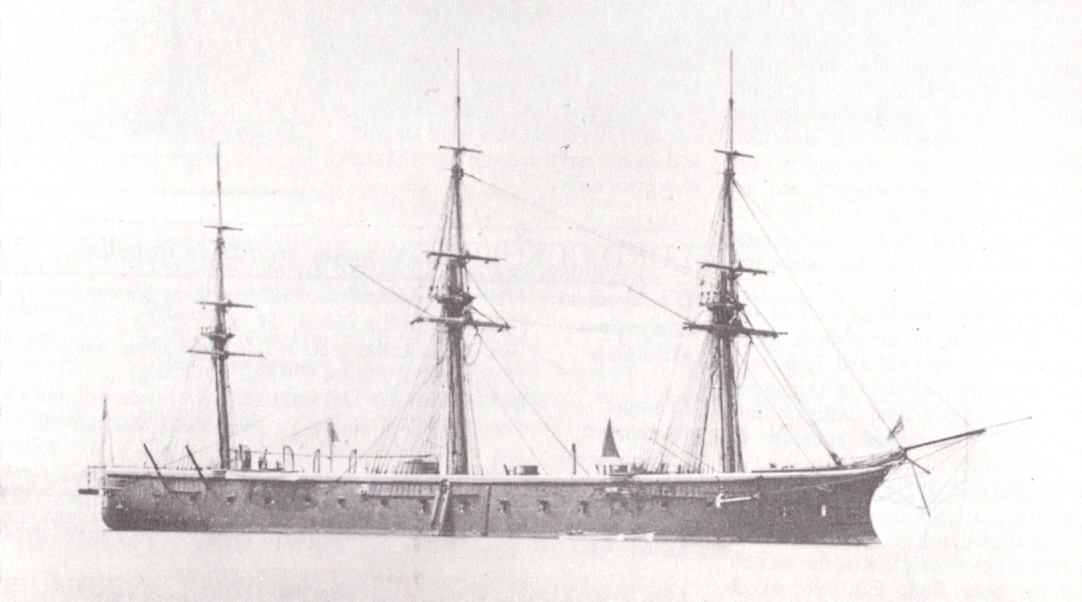
- HMS Bellerophon as she appeared when completed in 1866.

History

United Kingdom
- Name: HMS Bellerophon
- Namesake: Bellerophon
- Ordered: 23 July 1863
- Builder: Chatham Dockyard
- Cost: £356,493
- Laid down: 28 December 1863
- Launched: 18 April 1865
- Completed: 11 April 1866
- Commissioned: March 1866
- Renamed: Indus III in 1904
- Reclassified: Training hulk in 1904
- Stricken: 1914
- Nickname(s): "Old Billy"
- Fate: Sold for scrap 12 December 1922

General characteristics
- Type: Central battery ironclad
- Displacement: 7,551 long tons (7,672 t)
- Length: 300 ft (91.4 m)
- Beam: 56 ft 1 in (17.1 m)
- Draught: 26 ft 7 in (8.1 m)
- Installed power: 6,521 ihp (4,863 kW)
- Propulsion: 1 shaft, 1 Trunk steam engine
- Sail plan: Ship rigged
- Speed: 14 kn (26 km/h; 16 mph); 10 kn (19 km/h; 12 mph) under sail
- Range: 1,500 nmi (2,800 km; 1,700 mi) at 8 kn (15 km/h; 9.2 mph)
- Complement: 650
- Armament: 1866: 10 × 9-inch (229 mm) muzzle-loading rifles; 5 × 7-inch (178 mm) muzzle-loading rifles; 1885: 10 × BL 8-inch (203 mm) Mk III guns; 4 × 6 in (152 mm) breech loaders; 6 × 4 in (102 mm) breech loaders; 2 × 16-inch (406 mm) torpedo carriages
- Armour: Belt: 5–6 in (127–152 mm); Battery: 6 in (152 mm); Conning tower: 6–8 in (152–203 mm); Bulkheads: 5 in (127 mm); Deck: .5–1 in (13–25 mm)

HMS Bellerophon was a central battery ironclad built for the Royal Navy in the mid-1860s.

== Design and description ==
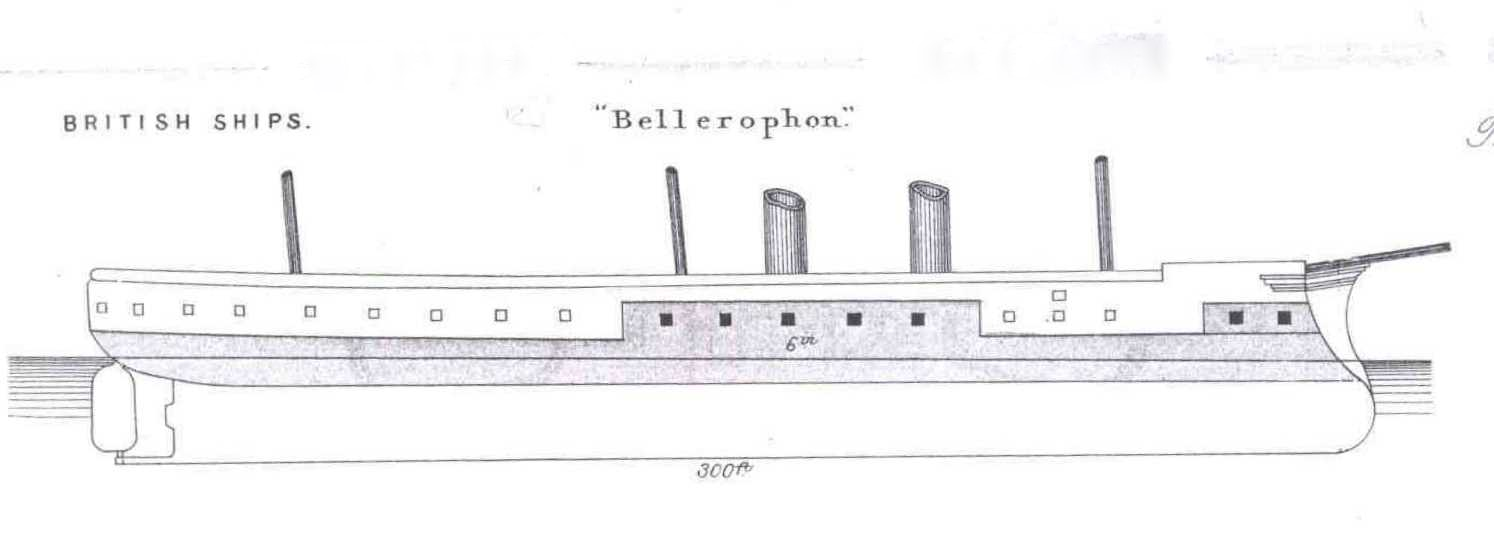
Right elevation drawing. The shaded areas represent the ship's armour.

In this ship, designed by Sir Edward Reed, the power-to-weight ratio was increased; the long rows of guns on the broadside were replaced by a small number of guns, centrally placed, of the largest possible calibre; the armour was increased in thickness but reduced in length, and a sharp beak ram was combined with a classical style plough bow.

This double bottom had the added advantage of allowing the engine to be carried higher, raising the centre of gravity of the whole ship and making her thereby a steadier gun platform. Unlike earlier classes, Bellerophon's bow and stern had a U-shaped profile, giving increased buoyancy at the ends noticeably absent in some earlier battleships. Bellerophon carried the first balanced rudder in Royal Navy service. Full helm could be applied by eight men in about 27 seconds, whereas in HMS Warrior it took forty men 90 seconds to perform the same manoeuvre.

HMS Bellerophon was 280 feet (85.3 m) long between perpendiculars. She had a beam of 56 feet 1 inch (17.1 m) and a maximum draught of 26 feet 7 inches (8.1 m).

=== Propulsion ===
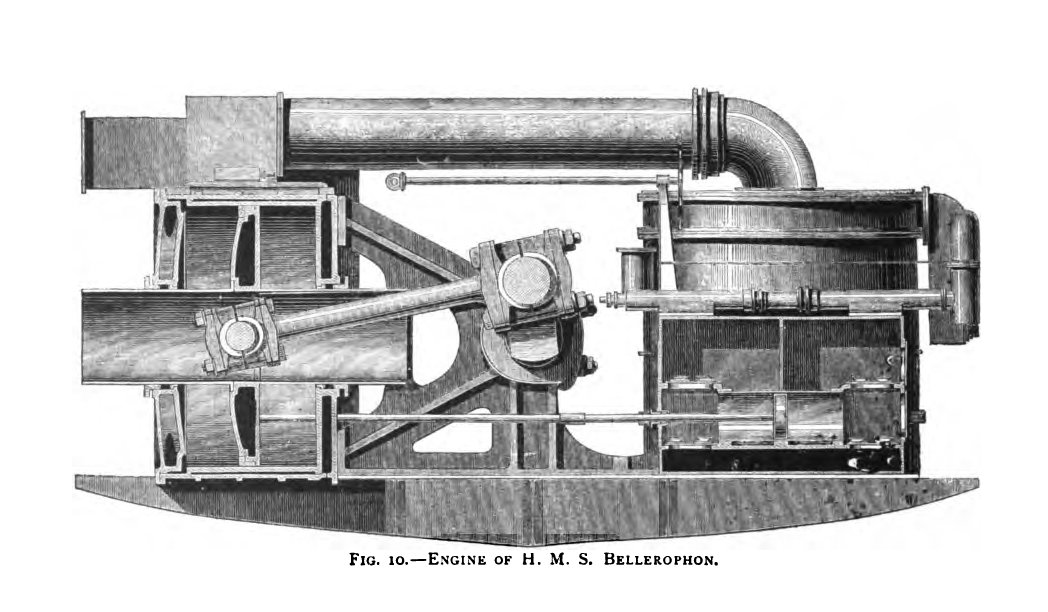
Cutaway view of Bellerophon's trunk engine

Bellerophon had one 2-cylinder trunk steam engine made by John Penn and Sons driving a single 23-foot-6-inch (7.2 m) propeller. Eight rectangular boilers provided steam to the engine at a working pressure of 27 psi (186 kPa; 2 kgf/cm^{2}). The engine produced a total of 6,521 indicated horsepower (4,863 kW) during the ship's sea trials in August 1864 and the ship had a maximum speed 14.17 knots (26.24 km/h; 16.31 mph). Bellerophon carried 640 long tons (650 t) of coal, enough to steam 1,500 nmi (2,800 km; 1,700 mi) at 8 knots (15 km/h; 9.2 mph).

The ironclad was ship rigged and had a sail area of 23,800 square feet (2,211 m^{2}). Bellerophon was "dull under canvas" and only made 10 knots (19 km/h; 12 mph) under sail in a moderate gale. The ship's propeller could be disconnected to reduce drag while under sail.

=== Armament ===
Bellerophon was the first British ironclad to carry the 9-inch rifled muzzle-loading gun. All ten of the 9-inch (229 mm) guns were mounted on the main deck, five on each side. Five 7-inch rifled muzzle-loaders were mounted outside the battery as chase guns. Four of these were mounted in pairs fore and aft on the main deck; the last gun was mounted on the upper deck at the stern. The ship also had four breech-loading 12-pounder Armstrong guns for use as saluting guns.

The shell of the 14-calibre 9-inch gun weighed 254 pounds (115.2 kg) while the gun itself weighed 12 long tons (12 t). It had a muzzle velocity of 1,420 ft/s (430 m/s) and was credited with the ability to penetrate a nominal 11.3 inches (287 mm) of wrought iron armour at the muzzle. The 16-calibre 7-inch (178 mm) gun weighed 6.5 long tons (6.6 t) and fired a 112-pound (50.8 kg) shell. It was credited with the nominal ability to penetrate 7.7-inch (196 mm) armour.

When the ship was refitted in 1881–85, she became the only British ironclad to have her entire muzzle-loading armament replaced by breech-loaders. Bellerophon received ten BL Mk III guns, mounted in the central battery and four 6-inch (152 mm) guns as chase guns fore and aft. The forward guns were mounted in new embrasures in the forecastle on the upper deck as the original guns were too low and were usually washed out in a head sea. Eight 4-inch breech-loading guns as well as four quick-firing 6-pounder Hotchkiss and 12 machine guns were fitted for defence against torpedo boats. The ship also received two 16-inch (406 mm) Whitehead torpedo launchers that were carried on the main deck, outside the armoured battery. The new eight-inch guns were some 7 feet (2.1 m) longer than the original nine-inch guns and the central battery proved to be too small for effective use of the guns.

=== Armour ===
Bellerophon had a complete waterline belt of wrought iron that was 6 inches (152 mm) thick amidships and tapered to 5 inches (127 mm) thick at the bow and stern. From the height of the main deck, it reached 6 feet (1.8 m) below the waterline. The central battery were protected by a section of 6-inch armour, 98 feet (29.9 m) long, with 5-inch (127 mm) transverse bulkheads at each end. The forward chase guns were protected by a strake of 4.5-inch (114 mm) armour. The upper deck was 1 inch (25 mm) thick over the battery and the main deck was 0.5 inches (13 mm) thick. The armour was backed by 8–10 inches (200–250 mm) of teak and the skin of the ship was 1.5 inches (38 mm) thick. The total weight of her armour was 1,093 long tons (1,111 t).

== Construction ==
For the first time since the construction of HMS Warrior, the basic method of construction of an ironclad's hull was altered. The usage of longitudinal girders to impart strength and resistance to the hull was discarded, and a "bracket frame" system devised by Nathaniel Barnaby was adopted. This system allowed for the inclusion into the ship of a double bottom, with clear survival implications if damaged, while at the same time allowing for a saving in weight so that 100 feet (30 m) of the hull of Bellerophon weighed 1,123 long tons (1,141 t), versus 1,303 long tons (1,324 t) for 100 feet (30 m) of HMS Black Prince. Some steel was used in the hull to save weight.

HMS Bellerophon was ordered on 23 July 1863 from the Royal Dockyard in Chatham, Kent. She was laid down on 28 December 1863 and launched on 26 April 1865. The ship was commissioned in March 1866 and completed on 11 April 1866. Bellerophon cost £356,493. (Note: Adjusted for inflation to 2026 pounds, £38,726,360.)

== Service history ==
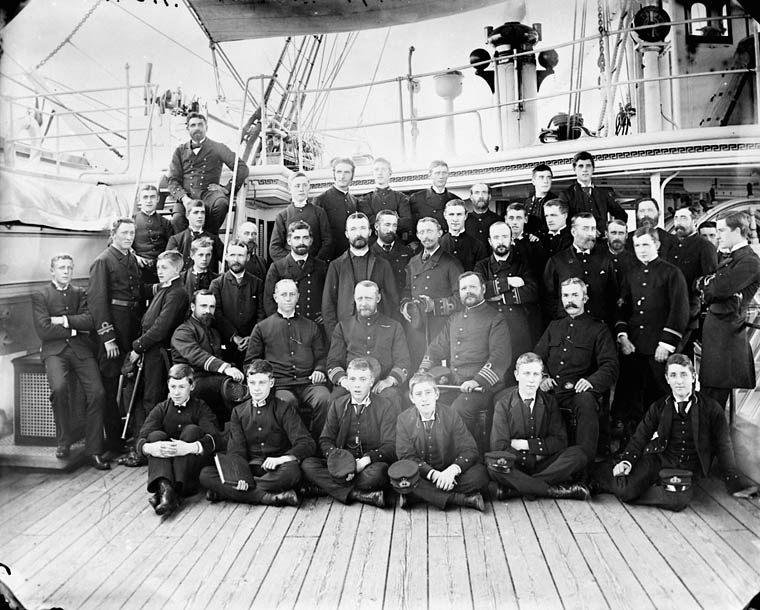
Bellerophon's officers at Halifax, Nova Scotia, Canada, while with the North America and West Indies Squadron, circa. 1889–1892

Bellerophon was commissioned at Chatham, and served in the Channel Fleet until 1871. She was struck by Minotaur in 1868 while leaving Belfast Lough, but only suffered minimal damage. The ship served with the Mediterranean Fleet from 1871 to 1872, and then paid off for refit where she was given a poop deck. Bellerophon relieved HMS Royal Alfred as flagship on the North America and West Indies Station in 1873, based at the Royal Naval Dockyard in the Imperial fortress colony of Bermuda. On 24 November 1873, Bellerophon collided with the Liverpool, Brazil and River Plate Steam Navigation Company's steamship Flamsteed, which sank. All on board Flamsteed were rescued by the Portuguese ship Blimani. Bellerophon remained on the North America and West Indies Station until 1881. An extensive refit, including new boilers and new armament was followed by a further period on the North America and West Indies Station until 1892, when she paid off at Plymouth. She was re-commissioned as port guardship at Pembroke until 1903. Bellerophon was converted into a stokers' training ship in 1904, and renamed HMS Indus III. The ship was sold on 12 December 1922 to P. and W. McLellan for scrap, although she did not arrive in Bo'ness for breaking-up until March 1923.
