= RML 7-inch gun =

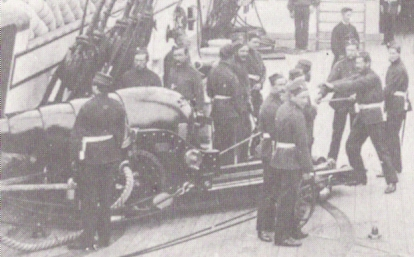
- 7-inch 6½ ton Mk I gun and crew on HMS Minotaur
- Type: Naval gun Coast defence gun
- Place of origin: United Kingdom

Service history
- Used by: Royal Navy; Ottoman Empire

Production history
- Designer: Royal Gun Factory
- Designed: 1865 (7 & 6½ ton); 1874 (90 cwt)
- Manufacturer: Royal Arsenal
- Unit cost: £425
- Variants: 7 ton Mks I – IV; 6½ ton Mks I – III; 90 cwt

Specifications
- Barrel length: 7 ton : 126 inches (3,200 mm); 6½ ton & 90 cwt : 111 inches (2,800 mm)
- Shell: 112 to 115 pounds (51 to 52 kg) Palliser, Common, Shrapnel; 160 pounds (73 kg) double common shell
- Calibre: 7-inch (177.8 mm)
- Muzzle velocity: 7 ton : 1,561 feet per second (476 m/s); 6½ ton : 1,525 feet per second (465 m/s); 90 cwt : 1,325 feet per second (404 m/s)
- Maximum firing range: 5,500 yards (5,000 m)

The RML 7-inch guns were various designs of medium-sized rifled muzzle-loading guns used to arm small to medium-sized British warships in the late 19th century, and some were used ashore for coast defence.

== Design and history ==
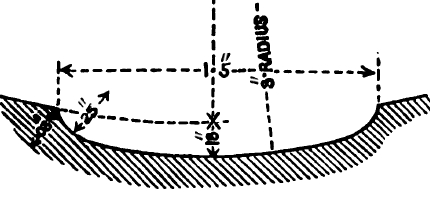
"Woolwich" rifling introduced in 1865

These guns were the first to incorporate the new "Woolwich" rifling system, a modification of the French system, of from 3 – 9 broad shallow grooves after Britain abandoned the Armstrong "shunt" rifling system in May 1865 : "...M.L. 7 in (18 cm) guns in course of manufacture were rifled on this principle, upon which all of our heavy pieces since have been rifled. The 7 in (18 cm) referred to, and introduced into the service in 1865, were the first of the so-called Woolwich guns, which then meant "wrought iron M.L. guns built up on Sir W. Armstrong's principle, improved upon by hooking the coils over one another, and having solid ended steel barrels, rifled on the system shown above, for studded projectiles".

All versions were constructed of a steel A tube surrounded by various numbers and thicknesses of wrought-iron coils. Rifling was 3 grooves with a uniform 1 turn in 35 calibres i.e. in 245 in (620 cm).

The diagrams below show the progression from the original expensive Armstrong construction in Mk I of multiple relatively thin coils, through to the simplified and cheaper Woolwich design of Mk III.

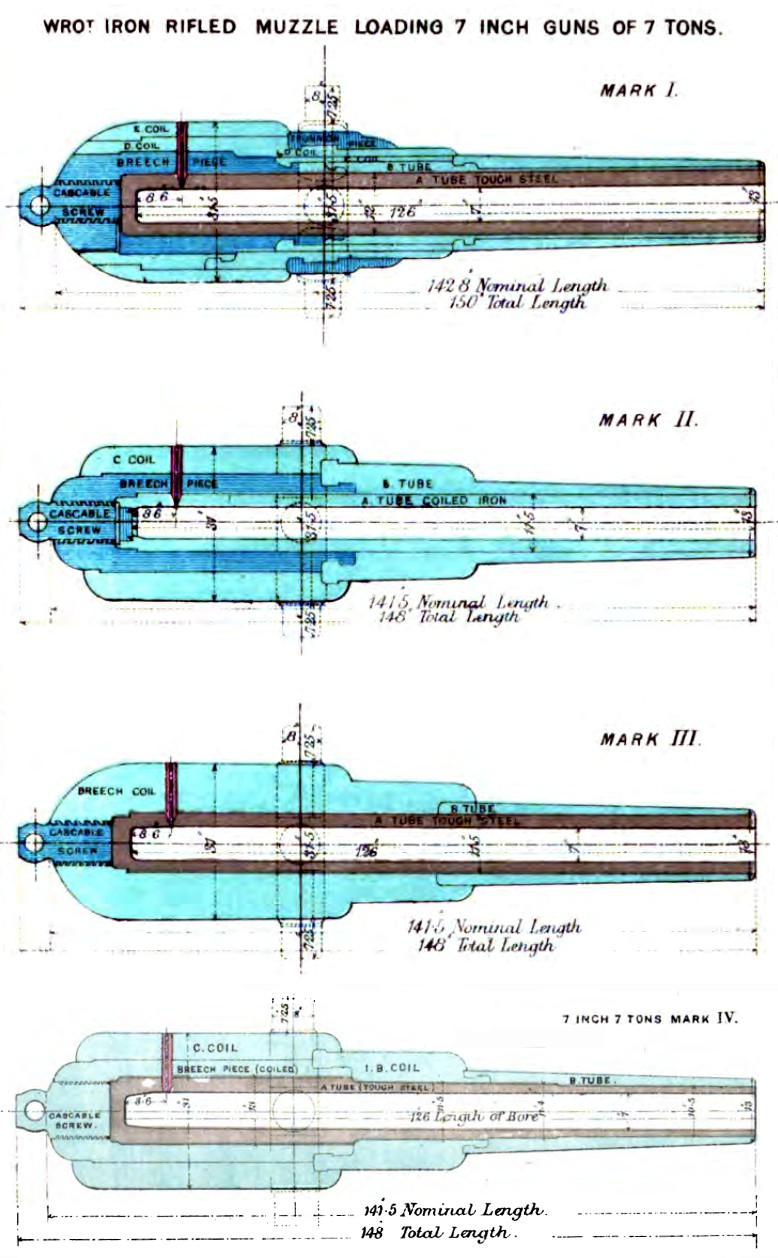
The 4 Marks of 7 ton gun

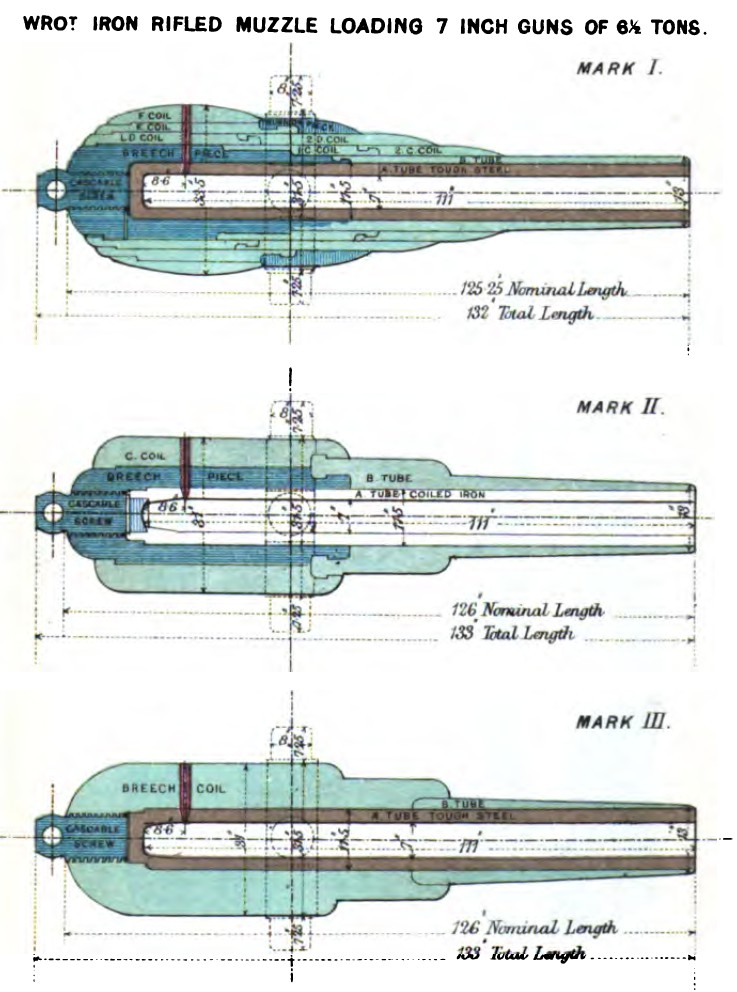
The 3 Marks of 6½ ton gun

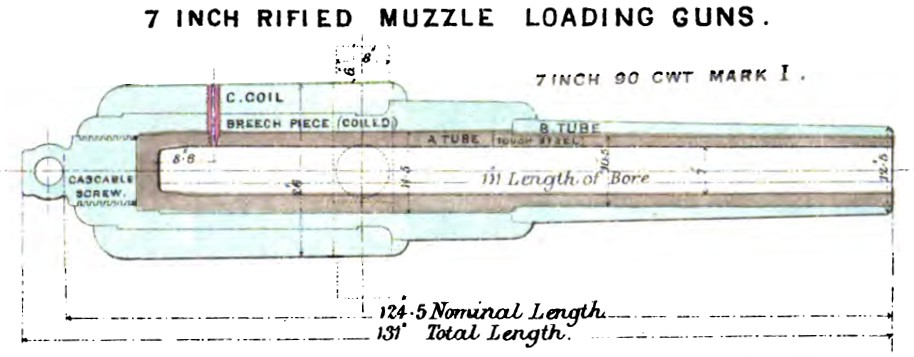
90 cwt gun

=== RML 7-inch 7 ton gun ===
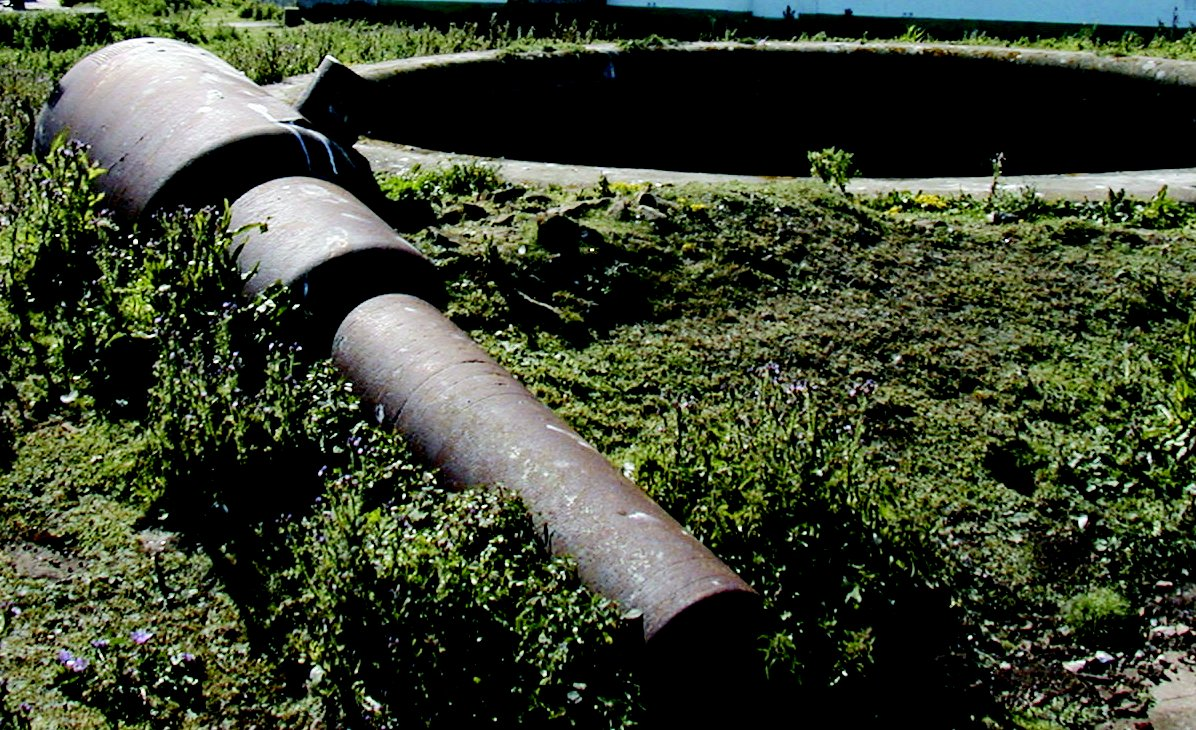
Remains of a 7-ton Mk III gun on Flat Holm island, UK

This was a coast defence gun introduced in 1865 to replace the failed RBL 7-inch Armstrong gun.Three marks were produced.

=== RML 7-inch 6½ ton gun ===
This was a naval gun introduced in 1865 "...as a broadside or pivot gun for frigates, to replace the 7-inch B.L. and 68-pr S.B. guns, and is now very extensively used, 331 having been made... These guns are in total length 18 in (46 cm) shorter than the land service [i.e. 7-ton] 7 in (18 cm) gun, being a length more suited to the requirements of the Navy". Some sources credit these weapons with the ability to pierce up to 7.7 inches (196 mm) of armour.

The following warships were armed with the gun :

- Amazon-class sloops in commission from 1865
- HMS Bellerophon commissioned in 1866
- HMS Vixen commissioned 1866
- HMS Viper commissioned 1866
- Minotaur-class ironclads commissioned 1867
- Eclipse-class sloops in commission from 1867
- Defence-class ironclads (as re-gunned in 1867)
- HMS Enterprise & HMS Research (as re-gunned in 1868)
- Warrior-class ironclads (as re-gunned in 1867–1868)
- Hector-class ironclads (from 1868)
- HMS Achilles (as re-gunned in 1868)
- HMS Inconstant in commission from 1869
- HMS Shah in commission from 1876
- Briton-class screw corvettes in commission from 1871

=== RML 7-inch 90 cwt gun ===
This was a lighter (90 cwt = 4½ tons) low-powered naval gun introduced in 1874 as a broadside gun on unarmoured vessels, and not intended for attacking armour plate. Early models were made by simply turning off some of the jacket around 7 in (18 cm) 6½ ton guns, as firing with reduced charges placed less strain on the coils. Some new guns were made to similar design.

The following warships were armed with the gun :

- Osprey-class sloops in commission from 1874
- HMS Raleigh in commission from 1874
- Fantome-class sloops in commission from 1874
- Bacchante-class corvettes in commission from 1877
- Condor-class gunvessels in commission from 1877

== Ammunition ==
The primary projectile for 7 ton and 6½ ton guns was Palliser shot or shell for attacking armoured warships, fired with a large "battering" charge for maximum velocity. All guns were also equipped with shrapnel shells for anti-personnel use and explosive common shells for attacking unarmoured targets. The "double" common shell was much longer than the standard common shell, and hence contained approximately twice as much gunpowder. It was unstable in flight and hence inaccurate beyond 2,000 yd (1.8 km) but was considered useful for attacking wooden warships at ranges below 2,000 yd (1.8 km).

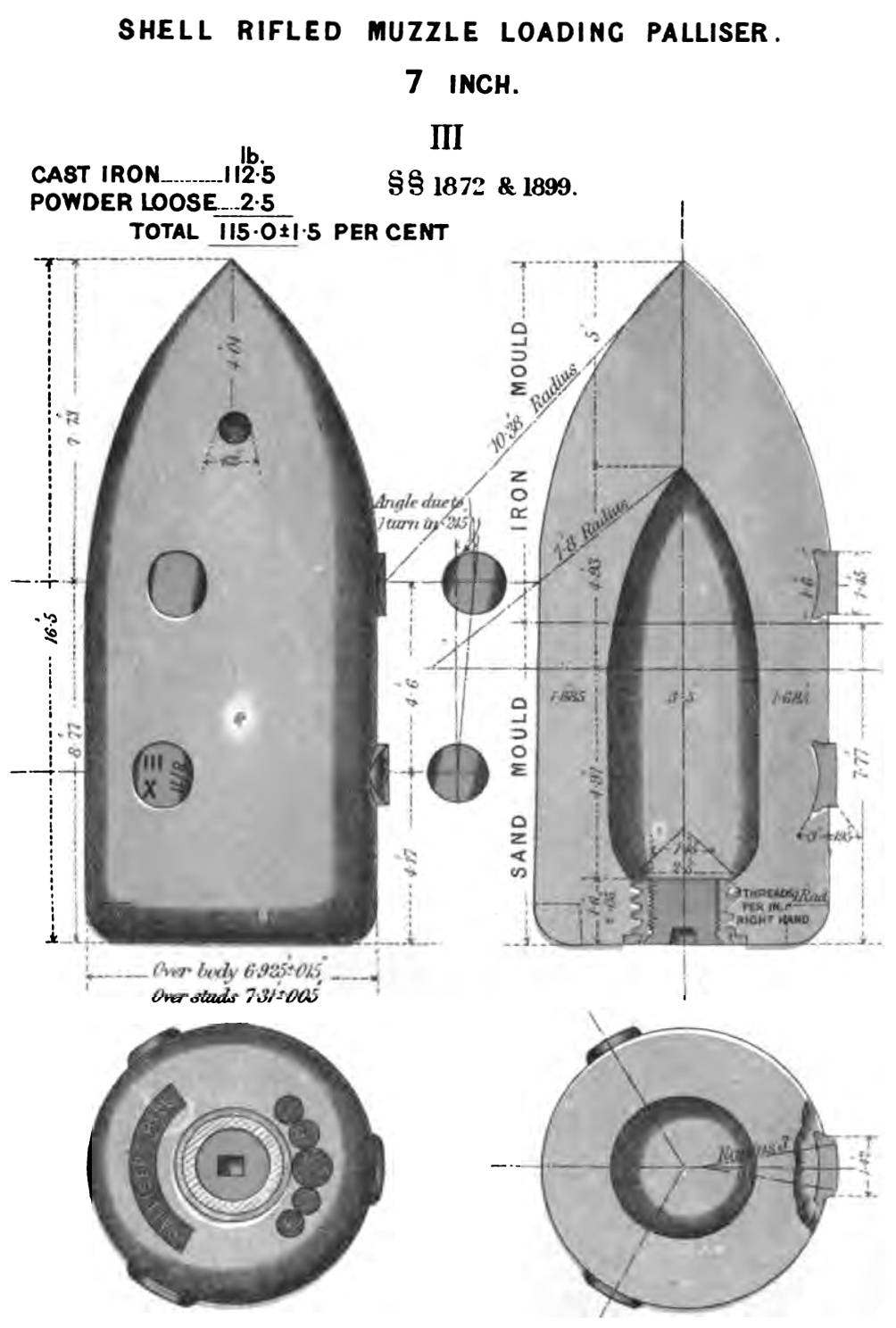
Mk III Palliser shell

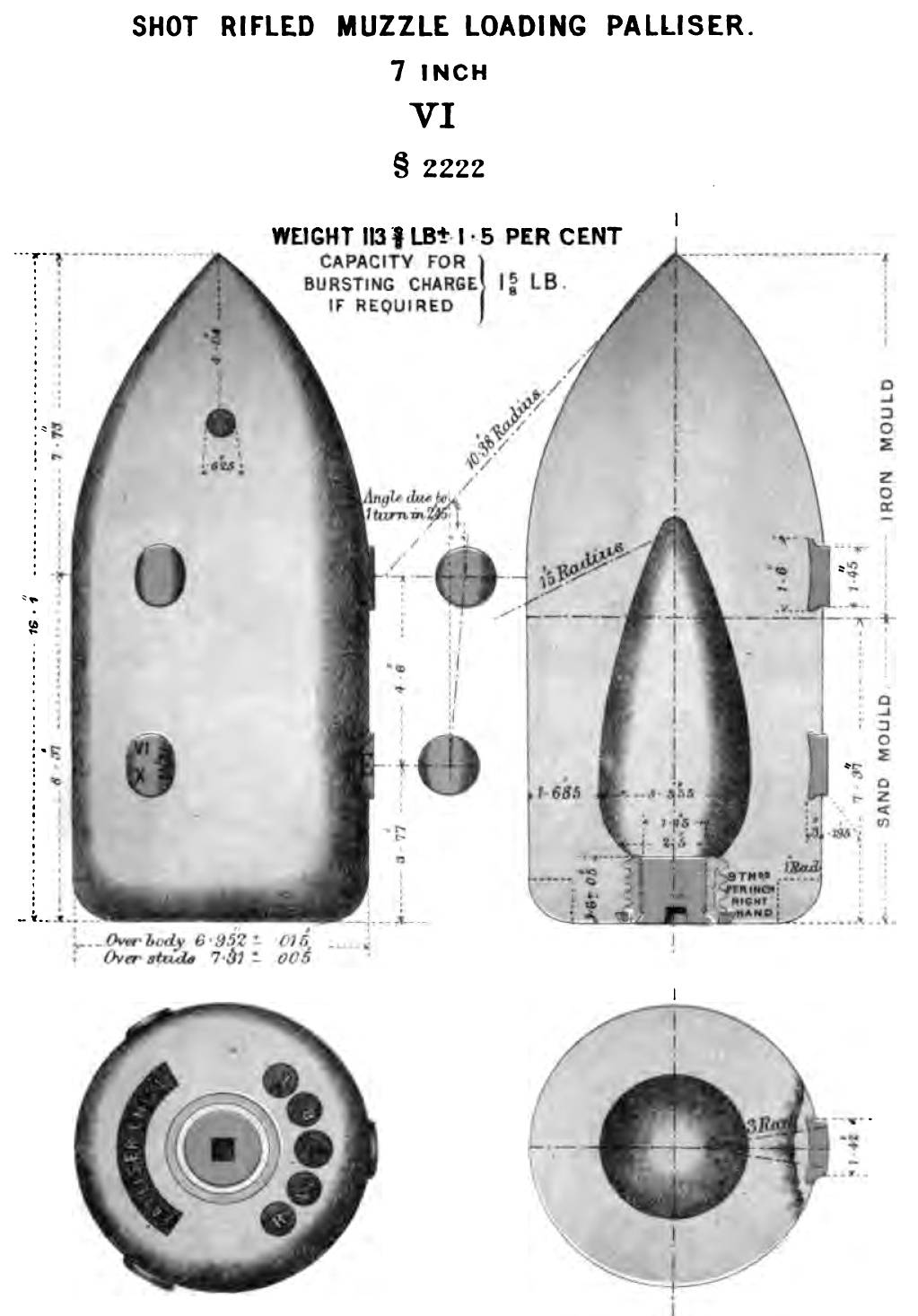
Mk VI Palliser shot

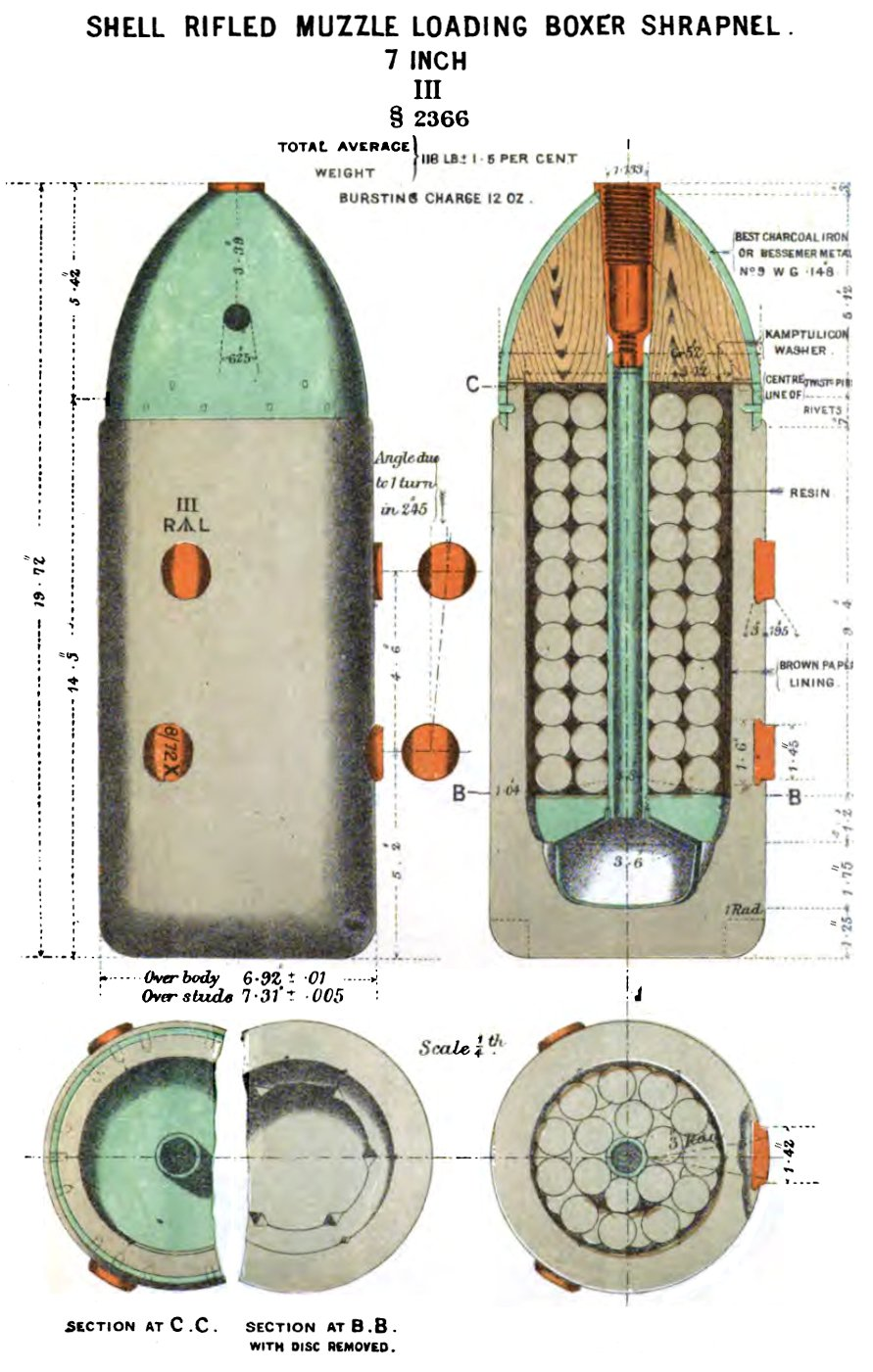
Mk III shrapnel shell

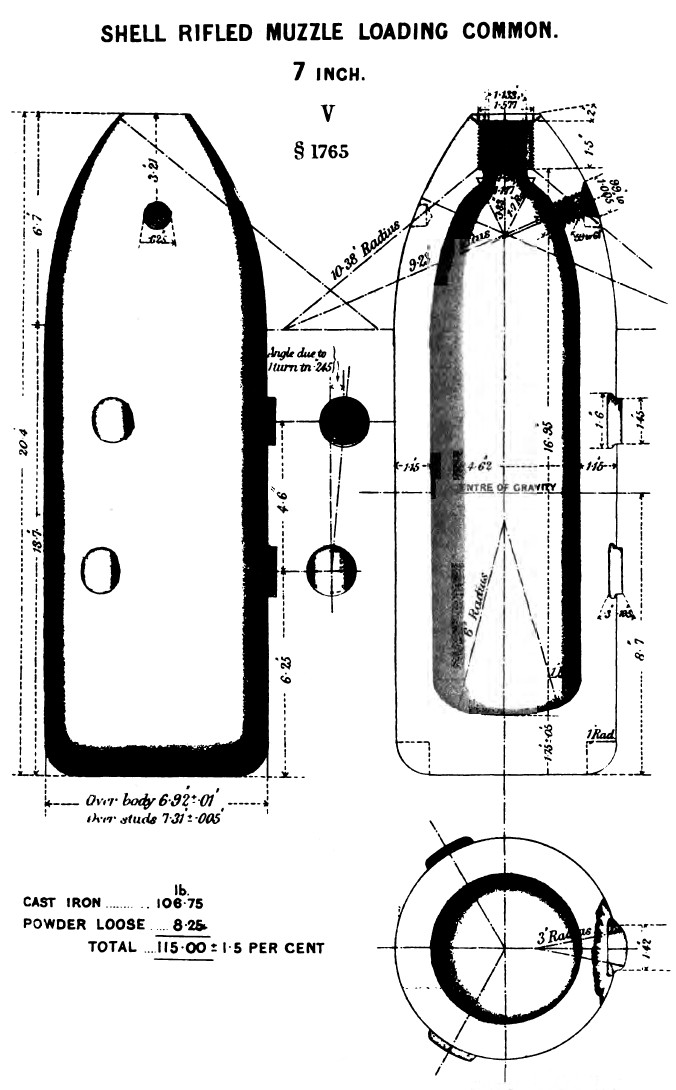
Mk V common shell

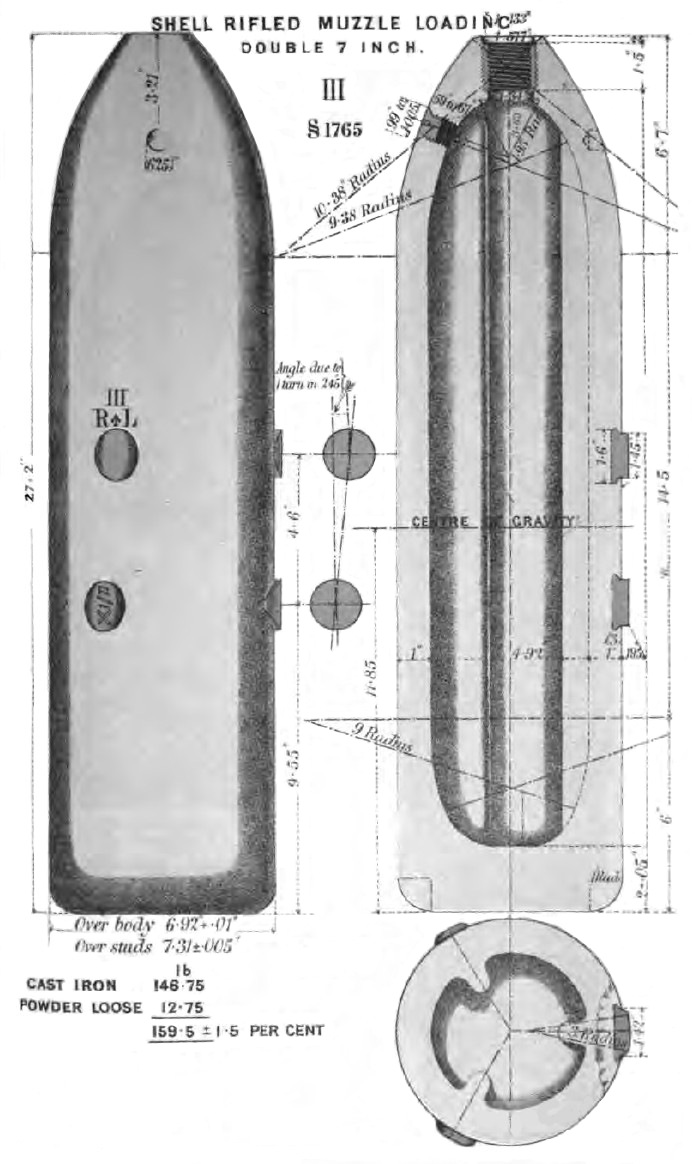
Mk III double common shell

This was the only RML heavy gun not to be issued with gas-checks.

== Surviving examples ==
- Restored 6½ ton Mk I Numbers 148 & 163 at Garden Island Rockingham, Western Australia (Fleet Base West). For restoration story see http://www.defence.gov.au/news/navynews/editions/4719/feature/feature06.htm
- Several 6½ ton Mk I guns on Ascension Island
- 6½ ton Mk I at Fort Siloso, Singapore
- 6½ ton Mk III of 1869, at Elizabeth Castle, Jersey, UK
- Remains of several 7 ton Mk III guns on Flat Holm island, UK
- Nine 7 ton Mk III guns on Steep Holm island, UK
- A 7-ton Mk I gun at The Citadel, Nova Scotia, Canada
- A 6½ ton Mk I gun on Signal Hill (Cape Town), South Africa.

== See also ==
- List of naval guns

== Bibliography ==
- Treatise on the construction and manufacture of ordnance in the British service. War Office, UK, 1877
- Treatise on Ammunition. War Office, UK, 1877
- Victorian Forts Website. Rifled Muzzle Loading Guns
- Sir Thomas Brassey, The British Navy, Volume II. London: Longmans, Green and Co. 1882
- Text Book of Gunnery, 1887. LONDON : PRINTED FOR HIS MAJESTY'S STATIONERY OFFICE, BY HARRISON AND SONS, ST. MARTIN'S LANE
- Brassey's Naval Annual, 1888
- Chesneau, Roger & Kolesnik, Eugene M., eds. (1979). Conway's All the World's Fighting Ships 1860-1905. Greenwich, UK: Conway Maritime Press. ISBN 0-8317-0302-4.
