= HMS Achilles (1863) =

Armoured frigate of the Royal Navy

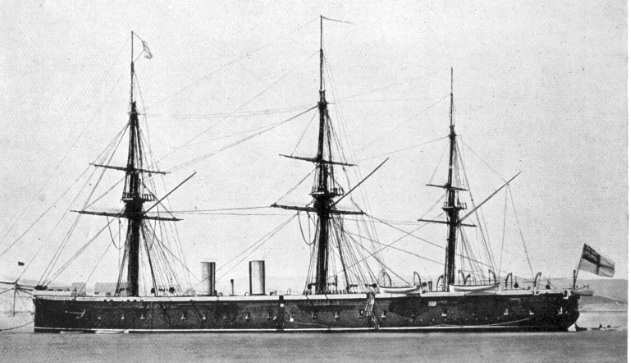
- Achilles, 1867–1877

History

United Kingdom
- Name: Achilles
- Namesake: Achilles
- Ordered: 10 April 1861
- Builder: Chatham Dockyard, England
- Cost: £469,572
- Laid down: 1 August 1861
- Launched: 23 December 1863
- Completed: 26 November 1864
- Renamed: 1902, Hibernia; March 1904, Egmont; 19 June 1916, Egremont; 6 June 1919, Pembroke
- Fate: Sold for scrap, 26 January 1923

General characteristics
- Type: Armoured frigate
- Displacement: 9,820 long tons (9,980 t)
- Length: 380 ft (115.8 m)
- Beam: 58 ft 3 in (17.8 m)
- Draught: 27 ft 2 in (8.3 m)
- Installed power: 10 boilers; 5,720 ihp (4,270 kW)
- Propulsion: 1 shaft, 1 trunk steam engine
- Sail plan: Ship rig
- Speed: 14 knots (26 km/h; 16 mph)
- Range: 1,800 nmi (3,300 km; 2,100 mi) at 6.5 knots (12.0 km/h; 7.5 mph)
- Complement: 709
- Armament: 4 × 7-inch (178 mm) Armstrong breech-loaders; 16 × 100-pounder (234 mm) Somerset smoothbore cannons; 6 × 68-pounder (206 mm) smoothbore guns; From 1868: 22 × 7-inch (178 mm) 6½ ton rifled muzzle-loading guns; 4 × 8-inch (203 mm) rifled muzzle-loading guns; From 1874: 2 × 7-inch (178 mm) 6½ ton muzzle-loading rifles; 14 × 9-inch (229 mm) 12 ton muzzle-loading rifles; From 1889: 2 × 6-inch (152 mm) 5 ton breech-loaders; 14 × 9-inch (229 mm) 12 ton muzzle-loading rifles; 6 × landing (boat and field) guns; 8 × QF 3-pounder (47 mm) guns; 16 × machine guns
- Armour: Belt: 2.5–4.5 in (64–114 mm); Bulkheads: 4.5 in (114 mm)

HMS Achilles was an armoured frigate (Note: Ironclad is the all-encompassing term for armoured warships of this period. Armoured frigates were basically designed for the same role as traditional wooden frigates, but this later changed as the size and expense of these ships forced them to be used in the line of battle.) built at Chatham for the Royal Navy in the 1860s to a design by Oliver Lang. Upon her completion in 1864 she was assigned to the Channel Fleet. The ship was paid off in 1868 to refit and be re-armed. When she recommissioned in 1869, she was assigned as the guard ship of the Fleet Reserve in the Portland District until 1874. Achilles was refitted and re-armed again in 1874 and became the guard ship of the Liverpool District in 1875. Two years later, she was rejoined the Channel Fleet before going to the Mediterranean in 1878. The ship returned to the Channel Fleet in 1880 and served until she was paid off in 1885.

Achilles was recommissioned in 1901 as a depot ship at Malta under a succession of different names. She was transferred to Chatham in 1914 and was again renamed multiple times before she was sold for scrap in 1923. Achilles had more changes of her rigging and armament than any other British warship, before or since.

== Design and description ==
Achilles was the third member of the 1861 Naval Programme and was designed as an improved version of the earlier Warrior-class armoured frigates with a complete waterline armour belt.

The ship was 380 feet 2 inches (115.9 m) long between perpendiculars, had a beam of 58 feet 3 inches (17.8 m) and a draft of 27 feet 2 inches (8.3 m). She displaced 9,820 long tons (9,980 t) and had a tonnage of 6,121 bm. The hull was subdivided by watertight transverse bulkheads into 106 compartments and had a double bottom. Achilles was designed with a high centre of gravity and was very stiff. So much so that the ship only rolled 10 degrees during one storm that ripped the main and mizen topgallant masts off and split her topsails. Because of her great length she was not very manoeuvrable. Achilles had a crew of 709 officers and ratings.

=== Propulsion ===
The ship had a single two-cylinder trunk steam engine made by John Penn and Sons driving a single 24-foot (7.3 m) propeller. Ten rectangular boilers provided steam to the engine at a working pressure of 25 psi (172 kPa; 2 kgf/cm^{2}). During her sea trials on 15 March 1865, Achilles had a maximum speed of 14.32 knots (26.52 km/h; 16.48 mph) from 5,722 indicated horsepower (4,267 kW). The ship carried 750 long tons (760 t) of coal, enough to steam 1,800 nautical miles (3,300 km; 2,100 mi) at 6.5 knots (12.0 km/h; 7.5 mph).

As built, Achilles was ship-rigged with four masts, called bow, fore, main and mizen from fore to aft, and she was the only British warship ever to have four masts. They carried a total of 44,000 square feet (4,088 m^{2}) of sail area, excluding the stunsails, the greatest area ever spread in a British warship. Her performance was unsatisfactory when the wind was before the beam and her bowsprit and bowmast were removed in June 1865 in an attempt to correct this problem. However, now she had too much weather helm so the bowsprit was replaced and the foremast was moved forward 25 feet (7.6 m) in July 1866. This reduced her sail area to 30,133 square feet (2,799 m^{2}). In 1877 Achilles was rerigged as a barque. Both of her funnels were retractable to reduce wind resistance while under sail alone.

=== Armament ===
The intended armament of Achilles changed no less than five times before it was finally mounted. She received four rifled 110-pounder breech-loading guns mounted on the upper deck, two of which served as chase guns at the bow and stern, and 16 smoothbore, muzzle-loading 100-pounder Somerset cannon, eight on each side on the main deck. The breech-loading guns were a new design from Armstrong and much was hoped for them. Firing tests carried out in September 1861 against an armoured target, however, proved that the 110-pounder was inferior to the 68-pounder smoothbore gun in armour penetration and repeated incidents of breech explosions during the Battles for Shimonoseki and the Bombardment of Kagoshima in 1863–1864 caused the navy to withdraw the gun from service shortly afterwards. In 1865, six 68-pounder smoothbores were added, three on each side of the main deck, although she was not comprehensively rearmed until her 1868 refit.

Detailed data for the Somerset cannon is not available, but the 7.9-inch (201 mm) solid shot of the 68-pounder gun weighed approximately 68 pounds (30.8 kg) while the gun itself weighed 10,640 pounds (4,826 kg). The gun had a muzzle velocity of 1,579 ft/s (481 m/s) and had a range of 3,200 yards (2,900 m) at an elevation of 12°. The seven-inch (178 mm) shell of the 110-pounder Armstrong breech-loader weighed 107–110 pounds (48.5–49.9 kg). It had a muzzle velocity of 1,150 ft/s (350 m/s) and, at an elevation of 11.25°, a maximum range of 4,000 yards (3,700 m). The 110-pounder gun weighed 9,520 pounds (4,318 kg). All of the guns could fire both solid shot and explosive shells.

Achilles was rearmed during her 1867–68 refit with 22 seven-inch and eight 8-inch (203 mm) rifled muzzle-loading guns. The eight-inch guns and 18 seven-inch guns were mounted on the main deck and the remaining seven-inch guns replaced the 110-pounders on the upper deck. The shell of the 15-calibre eight-inch gun weighed 175 pounds (79.4 kg) while the gun itself weighed nine long tons (9.1 t). It had a muzzle velocity of 1,410 ft/s (430 m/s) and was credited with the ability to penetrate 9.6 inches (244 mm) of wrought iron armour at the muzzle. The 16-calibre seven-inch gun weighed 6.5 long tons (6.6 t) and fired a 112 pounds (50.8 kg) shell. It was credited with the ability to penetrate 7.7-inch (196 mm) armour.

In 1874 the ship was rearmed with 16 nine-inch rifled muzzle-loaders replacing the 4 eight-inch and 20 of the 22 seven-inch guns. Fourteen of the nine-inch (229 mm) guns were mounted on the main deck and the other two replaced the seven-inch chase guns. The two remaining seven-inch guns stayed in their position on the quarterdeck. As the nine-inch guns were considerably bigger than their predecessors, the gun ports had to be widened to accommodate them. The shell of the 14-calibre nine-inch gun weighed 254 pounds (115.2 kg) while the gun itself weighed 12 long tons (12 t). It had a muzzle velocity of 1,420 ft/s (430 m/s) and was rated with the ability to penetrate a 11.3 inches (287 mm) of wrought iron armour at the muzzle.

=== Armour ===
The ship had a wrought-iron waterline armour belt that ran the full length of the ship. Amidships, it was 4.5 inches (114 mm) thick for a length of 212 feet (64.6 m) and tapered to a thickness of 2.5 inches (64 mm) to the ends of the ship. The armour extended 5 feet 6 inches (1.7 m) below the waterline. The main deck was protected by a strake of armour, also 4.5-inch thick and 212 feet long. To protect against raking fire the upper strake was closed off by 4.5-inch transverse bulkheads at each end.

== Construction and career ==
Achilles, named after the Greek mythological hero, was ordered on 10 April 1861 from the Chatham Dockyard. She was the first iron-hulled warship to be built at a royal dockyard and her construction was delayed by the need to acquire the necessary machinery to handle iron and to train the workers to use it. The ship was laid down on 1 August 1861 in a drydock and was floated out rather than being launched on 23 December 1863. Achilles was completed on 26 November 1864 at the cost of £469,572.

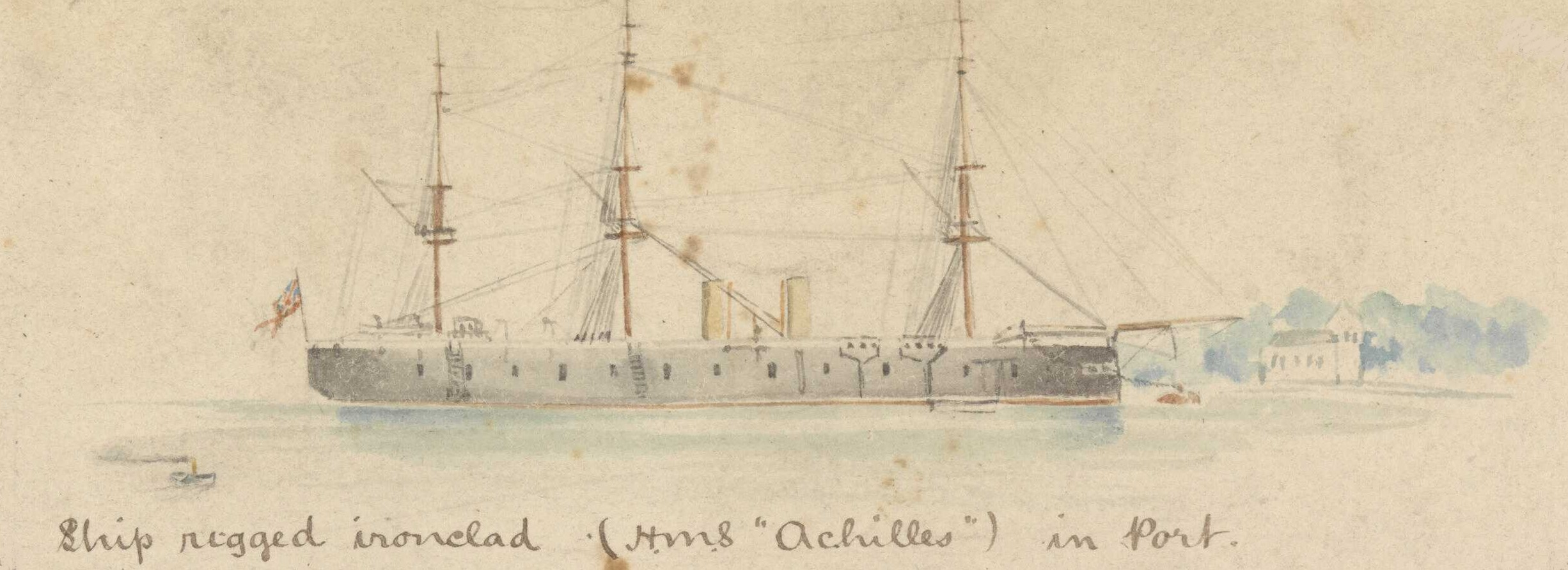
A watercolor drawing of Achilles, 1881

She served in the Channel Fleet until 1868. After a refit and her first major re-armament, Achilles became the guardship at Portland until 1874 when she was again re-armed. Upon its completion in 1875, the ship became guardship at Liverpool until 1877 when Captain William Hewett, VC, assumed command. In 1878 she was one of the ships in the Particular Service Squadron which Admiral Geoffrey Hornby took through the Dardanelles at the time of the Russian war scare in June–August 1878 during the Russo-Turkish War. Achilles accidentally collided with the flagship of the Mediterranean Fleet, HMS Alexandra, on 4 October 1879, but was only lightly damaged by Alexandra's propeller. The ship rejoined the Channel Fleet in 1880 and was paid off in 1885.

She lay derelict in the Hamoaze until April 1901, when she was sent to Malta as a depot ship. To release her name for the new armoured cruiser, Achilles was renamed Hibernia in 1902. She was renamed Egmont in March 1904, and remained in Malta until 1914. Her role in Malta was assumed by the stone frigate Fort St Angelo. She was brought home to Chatham that year, and served there as a depot ship under the successive names of Egremont (19 June 1916) and Pembroke (6 June 1919). The ship was sold for scrap on 26 January 1923 to the Granton Shipbreaking Co.

== The Achilles in Literature ==
Charles Dickens offered a short meditation on the construction of HMS Achilles following a visit to Chatham Dockyard in 1863, first published in the weekly magazine All the Year Round on 29 August 1863, and then included in his collection The Uncommercial Traveller. Dickens came away impressed by the experience, and the idea that such a large iron construction could float or move. "To think that this Achilles, monstrous compound of iron tank and oaken chest, can ever swim or roll! To think that any force of wind and wave could ever break her!"
