= HMS Defence (1861) =

1861 ship of the Royal Navy

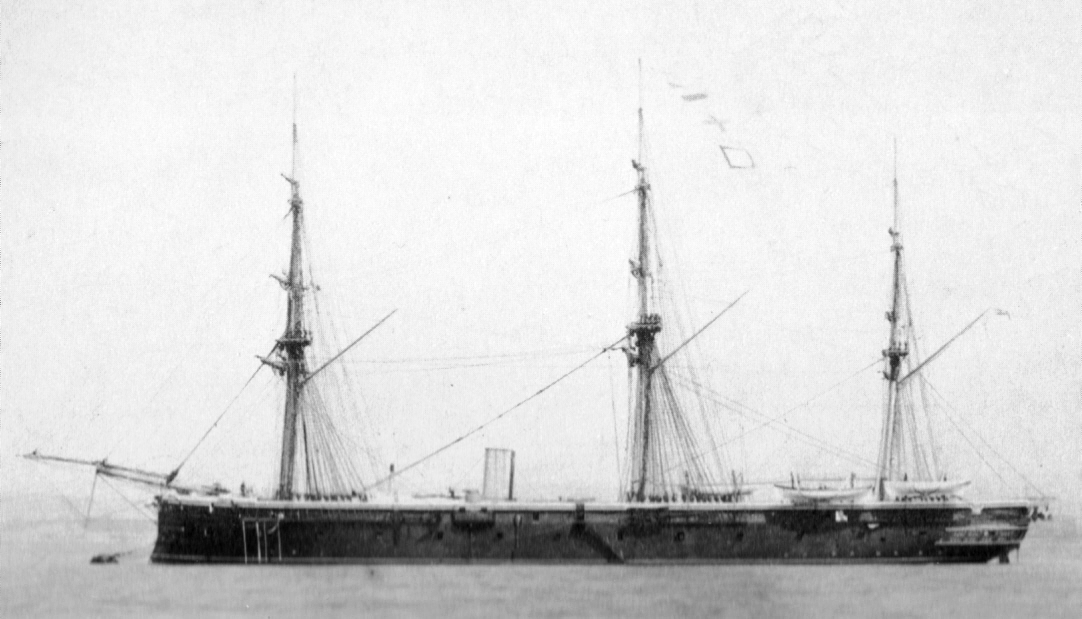
- Defence as she appeared after the final modification of her sailing rig in 1866

History

United Kingdom
- Name: Defence
- Ordered: 14 December 1859
- Builder: Palmers, Jarrow
- Laid down: 14 December 1859
- Launched: 24 April 1861
- Completed: 12 February 1862
- Commissioned: 4 December 1861
- Renamed: HMS Indus, 1898
- Fate: Sold for scrap, August 1935

General characteristics
- Class & type: Defence-class armoured frigate
- Displacement: 6,070 long tons (6,170 t)
- Length: 280 ft (85.3 m)
- Beam: 54 ft 2 in (16.5 m)
- Draught: 26 ft 2 in (8 m)
- Installed power: 4 boilers; 2,343 ihp (1,747 kW)
- Propulsion: 1 shaft; 1 trunk steam engine
- Sail plan: Ship rig
- Speed: 11 knots (20 km/h; 13 mph)
- Range: 1,670 nmi (3,090 km; 1,920 mi) at 10 knots (19 km/h; 12 mph)
- Complement: 460
- Armament: 4 × 5 in (127 mm) rifled breech-loading (RBL) guns; 8 × 7 in (178 mm) RBLs; 10 × 68 pdr smoothbore guns; From 1868 : 14 × 7 in rifled muzzle-loading (RML) guns; 2 × 8 in (203 mm) RMLs
- Armour: Belt: 4.5 in (114 mm); Bulkheads: 4.5 in (114 mm)

HMS Defence was the lead ship of the Defence-class armoured frigates ordered by the Royal Navy in 1859. Upon completion in 1862 she was assigned to the Channel Fleet. The ship was paid off in 1866 to be refitted and rearmed and was briefly reassigned to the Channel Fleet when she recommissioned in 1868. Defence had short tours on the North Atlantic and Mediterranean Stations, relieving other ironclads, from 1869 to 1872 before she was refitted again from 1872 to 1874. She became guard ship on the River Shannon when she recommissioned. The ship was transferred to the Channel Fleet again in 1876 and then became guard ship on the River Mersey until 1885. Defence was placed in reserve until 1890, when she was assigned to the mechanical training school in Devonport in 1890. She was renamed Indus when the school adopted that name and served there until sold for scrap in 1935.

== Design and description ==
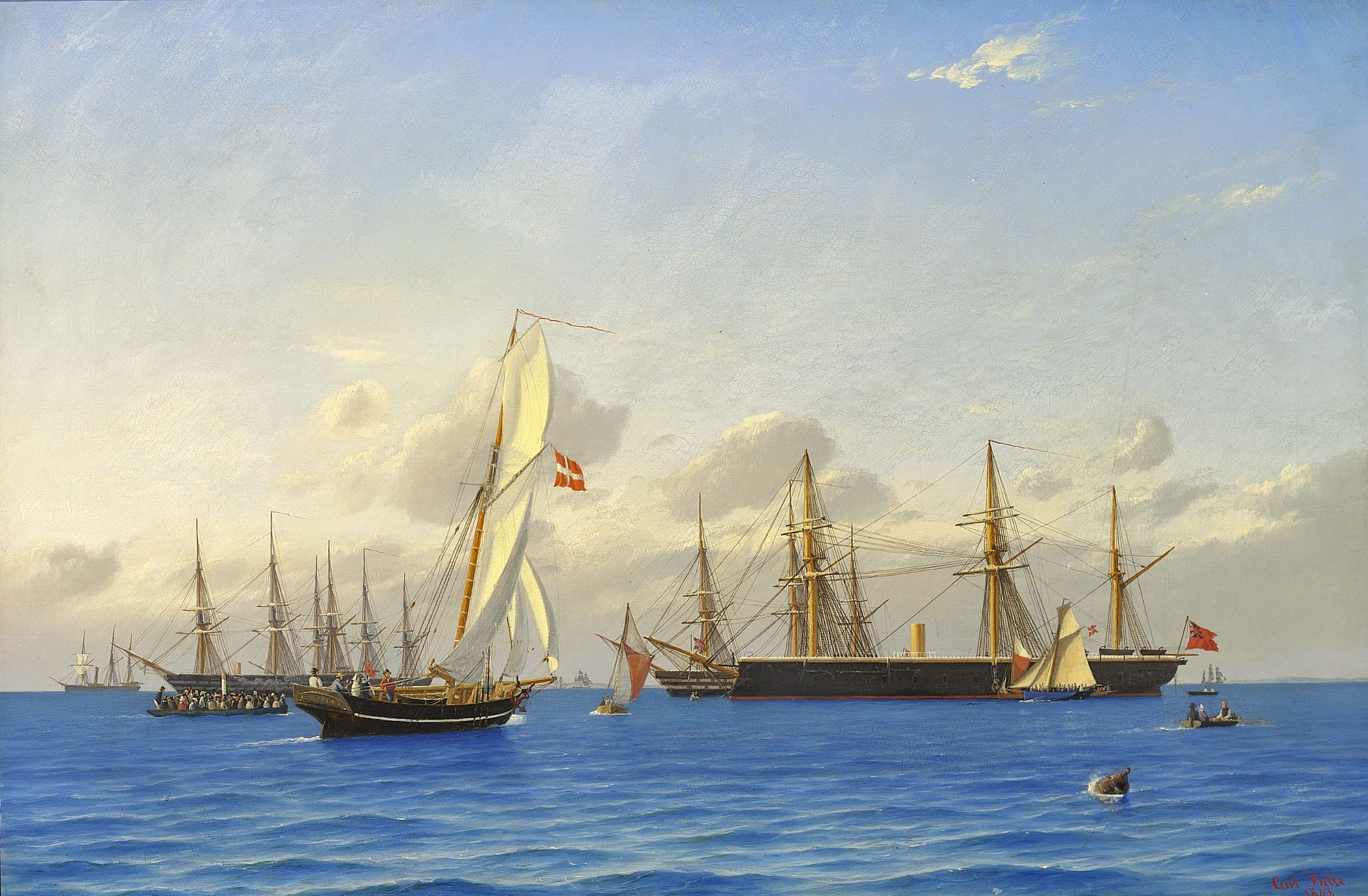
Defence at Copenhagen in August 1862

The Defence-class ironclads (Note: Ironclad is the all-encompassing term for armored warships of this period. Armoured frigates were basically designed for the same role as traditional wooden frigates, but this later changed as the size and expense of these ships forced them to be used in the line of battle.) were designed as smaller and cheaper versions of the Warrior-class armoured frigates. This meant that they could not fit the same powerful engines of the Warrior-class ships and were therefore 2 knots (3.7 km/h; 2.3 mph) slower and had far fewer guns. The naval architect Sir Nathaniel Barnaby, a future Constructor of the Navy, considered that in terms of combat a Defence-class ship was worth one quarter of a Warrior.

HMS Defence was 280 feet (85.3 m) long between perpendiculars and 291 feet 4 inches (88.8 m) long overall. She had a beam of 54 feet 2 inches (16.51 m) and a draft of 26 feet 2 inches (8 m). The ship displayed 6,070 long tons (6,170 t) and had a ram in the shape of a plough. The hull was subdivided by watertight transverse bulkheads into 92 compartments and had a double bottom underneath the engine and boiler rooms. Defence was 128 feet 8 inches (39.2 m) shorter overall and displaced over 3,000 long tons (3,000 t) less than the Warrior-class ironclads.

=== Propulsion ===
The Defence-class ships had one 2-cylinder trunk steam engine made by John Penn and Sons driving a single propeller. Four rectangular boilers provided steam to the engine. It produced a total of 2,343 indicated horsepower (1,747 kW). During her sea trials on 10 February 1868 Defence had a maximum speed of 11.23 knots (20.80 km/h; 12.92 mph). The ship carried 450 long tons (460 t) of coal, enough to steam 1,670 nautical miles (3,090 km; 1,920 mi) at 10 knots (19 km/h; 12 mph).

The ironclads were barque-rigged and had a sail area of 24,500 square feet (2,276 m^{2}). The lower masts and bowsprit were made of iron to withstand the shock of ramming. Defence could make about 10.5 knots (19.4 km/h; 12.1 mph) under sail and the funnel was semi-retractable to reduce wind resistance while under sail alone. The ship's propeller could be hoisted up into the stern of the ship to reduce drag while under sail. She was re-rigged as a barque from September 1864 to April 1866 before returning to her original ship rig.

=== Armament ===
The armament of the Defence-class ships was intended to be 18 smoothbore, muzzle-loading 68-pounder guns, eight on each side on the main deck and one each fore and aft as chase guns on the upper deck, plus four rifled breech-loading 40-pounder guns as saluting guns. This was modified during construction to eight rifled 110-pounder breech-loading guns, ten 68-pounders and four breech-loading 5-inch (127 mm) guns. (Note: No such gun ever entered RN service during this time; these may have been experimental 70-pounder Armstrong guns developed in parallel with the 40- and 110-pounder guns or the 40-pounder gun called by its calibre, rounding upwards.) Both breech-loading guns were new designs from Armstrong and much was hoped of them. Six of the 110-pounder guns were installed on the main deck amidships, and the other two became chase guns; all of the 68-pounder guns were mounted on the main deck. Firing tests carried out in September 1861 against an armoured target, however, proved that the 110-pounder was inferior to the 68-pounder smoothbore gun in armour penetration and repeated incidents of breech explosions during the Battles for Shimonoseki and the Bombardment of Kagoshima in 1863–1864 caused the navy to begin to withdraw the gun from service shortly afterwards.

The 7.9-inch (201 mm) solid shot of the 68-pounder gun weighed approximately 68 pounds (30.8 kg) while the gun itself weighed 10,640 pounds (4,826 kg). The gun had a muzzle velocity of 1,579 ft/s (481 m/s) and had a range of 3,200 yards (2,900 m) at an elevation of +12°. The 7-inch (178 mm) shell of the 110-pounder Armstrong breech-loader weighed 107–110 pounds (48.5–49.9 kg). It had a muzzle velocity of 1,150 ft/s (350 m/s) and, at an elevation of +11.25°, a maximum range of 4,000 yards (3,700 m). The 110-pounder gun weighed 9,520 pounds (4,318.2 kg). All of the guns could fire both solid shot and explosive shells.

Defence was rearmed during her 1867–1868 refit with fourteen 7-inch and two 8-inch (203 mm) rifled muzzle-loading guns. The new guns were heavier so fewer could be carried. The shell of the 15-calibre 8-inch gun weighed 175 pounds (79.4 kg) while the gun itself weighed 9 long tons (9.1 t). It had a muzzle velocity of 1,410 ft/s (430 m/s) and was credited with the ability to penetrate a nominal 9.6 inches (244 mm) of wrought iron armour at the muzzle. The 16-calibre 7-inch gun weighed 6.5 long tons (6.6 t) and fired a 112 pounds (50.8 kg) shell. It was credited with the nominal ability to penetrate 7.7-inch (196 mm) armour.

=== Armour ===
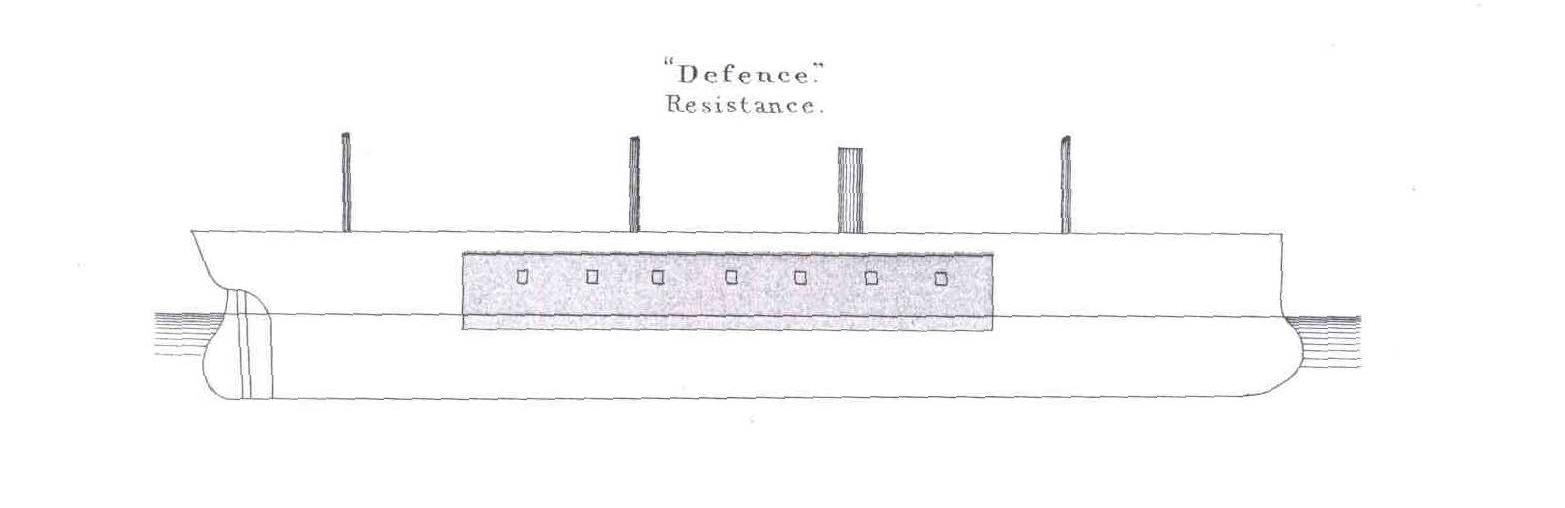
Right elevation of HMS Defence from Brassey's Naval Annual 1888, the shaded area shows the ship's armour

The Defence-class ships had a wrought iron armour belt, 4.5 inches (114 mm) thick, that covered 140 feet (42.7 m) amidships. The armour extended from upper deck level to 6 feet (1.8 m) below it. 4.5-inch transverse bulkheads protected the guns on the main deck. The armour was backed by 18 inches (460 mm) of teak. The ends of the ship were left entirely unprotected which meant that the steering gear was very vulnerable. They were, however, sub-divided into many watertight compartments to minimize any flooding.

== Service ==
Defence was laid down on 14 December 1859 by the Palmers Shipbuilding and Iron Company in Jarrow. She was launched on 24 April 1861, but ran aground. She was refloated the next day. During speed trials on 22 February 1862, she collided with HMS Fenella off Spithead. Her anchor was pushed through her bow below the waterline and she ran aground. She was refloated and taken in to Portsmouth Dockyard for repairs. HMS Defence was commissioned on 4 December 1861 and completed on 12 February 1862. After completion she served in the Channel Fleet until 1866, when she paid off in Plymouth for refit and re-armament. The ship returned to the Channel Fleet in 1868, and in 1869 she was sent to the North America station to relieve HMS Royal Alfred. She served with the Mediterranean Fleet from 1871 to 1872 under the command of Captain Nowell Salmon, who had earned the Victoria Cross during the Indian Mutiny in 1857. While recovering items lost when the ironclad HMS Lord Clyde grounded off Pantelleria, Defence damaged her propeller and rudder when she briefly grounded in the trough of a wave, and was nearly blown ashore herself on 24 March 1872. Repairs cost £417. She was paid off again for a lengthy refit in Plymouth between 1872 and 1874 and became the guard ship on the Shannon until 1876. The ship then rejoined the Channel Fleet until 1879 and was transferred with most of that fleet to the Mediterranean while the Mediterranean Fleet patrolled the Dardanelles during the Russo-Turkish War of 1878. Defence replaced her sister ship HMS Resistance as guard ship in the Mersey until 1885, after which she saw no further sea-going service. On 20 July 1884 the ship collided with HMS Valiant in Lough Swilly, damaging her bow and flooding some compartments. In 1890 she was converted into a floating workshop at Devonport, and was renamed HMS Indus in 1898. Rear Admiral Thomas Sturges Jackson, Admiral-superintendent Devonport Dockyard, transferred his flag to the Indus on 11 April 1900. She was sold for scrap at Devonport in August 1935.
