= HMS Valiant (1863) =

British Hector-class armoured frigates

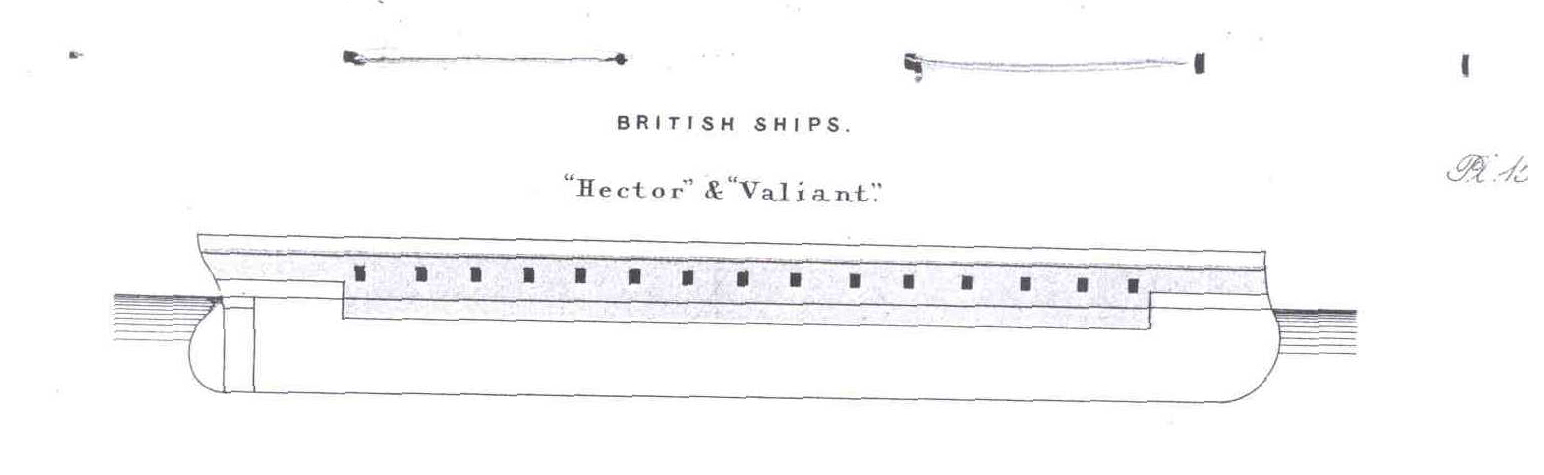
- Line drawing of the Valiant

History

United Kingdom
- Name: Valiant
- Ordered: 25 January 1861
- Builder: Westwood, Baillie, Cubitt Town; Thames Ironworks and Shipbuilding Company, Leamouth, London
- Laid down: February 1861
- Launched: 14 October 1863
- Completed: 15 September 1868
- Commissioned: September 1868
- Decommissioned: 1885
- Fate: Sold for scrap, 1956

General characteristics
- Class & type: Hector-class armoured frigate
- Displacement: 7,000 long tons (7,100 t)
- Length: 280 ft 2 in (85.4 m)
- Beam: 56 ft 4 in (17.2 m)
- Draught: 26 ft 2 in (8 m)
- Installed power: 6 boilers; 3,560 ihp (2,650 kW)
- Propulsion: 1 shaft, 1 HRCR steam engine
- Sail plan: Barque-rigged
- Speed: 12 knots (22 km/h; 14 mph)
- Range: 800 nmi (1,500 km; 920 mi) at 12 kn (22 km/h; 14 mph)
- Complement: 530
- Armament: 16 × 7 in rifled muzzle-loading (RML) guns; 2 × 8 in (203 mm) RMLs
- Armour: Belt: 2.5–4.5 in (64–114 mm); Bulkheads: 4.5 in (114 mm)

HMS Valiant was the second ship of the Hector-class armoured frigates ordered by the Royal Navy in 1861. Her builders went bankrupt shortly after she was laid down, which significantly delayed her completion. After being launched in 1863, she waited a further five years to receive her guns due to supply issues. Upon being commissioned in 1868 the ship was assigned as the First Reserve guard ship for Southern Ireland, where she remained until she was decommissioned in 1885. Valiant was hulked in 1897 as part of the stoker training school HMS Indus before becoming a storeship for kite balloons during the First World War. The ship was converted to a floating oil tank in 1926 and served in that role until sold for scrap in 1956.

== Design and description ==
The Hector-class ironclads, (Note: Ironclad is the all-encompassing term for armoured warships of this period. Armoured frigates were basically designed for the same role as traditional wooden frigates, but this later changed as the size and expense of these ships forced them to be used in the line of battle.) like their immediate predecessors, the Defence class, were designed as smaller and cheaper versions of the Warrior-class armoured frigates. They were modified versions of the Defence-class ships with additional armour and more powerful engines.

Valiant was 280 feet 2 inches (85.4 m) long between perpendiculars. She had a beam of 56 feet 4 inches (17.2 m) and a draft of 26 feet 2 inches (8 m). The ship was 300 long tons (300 t) overweight and displaced 7,000 long tons (7,100 t). The hull was subdivided by watertight transverse bulkheads into 92 compartments and had a double bottom underneath the engine and boiler rooms. The ships of her class were designed with a very low centre of gravity and had a metacentric height of 4 feet 6 inches (1.4 m). While handy in manoeuvring, they rolled quite badly.

=== Propulsion ===
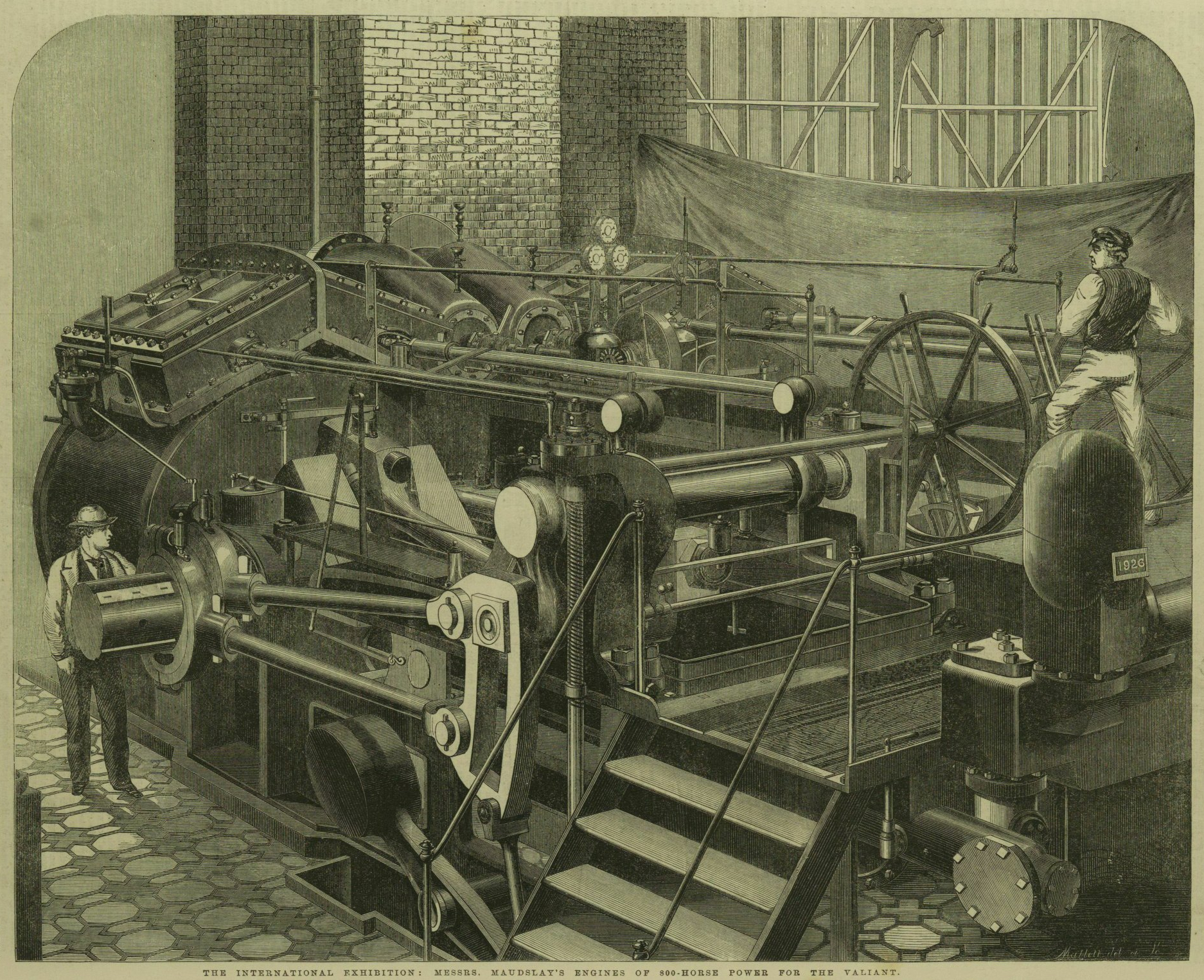
Messers. Maudslay's engines of 800-horse power for the Valiant were shown at the 1862 International Exhibition

Valiant had one 2-cylinder horizontal-return connecting-rod steam engine made by Maudslay Sons & Field driving a single 20-foot-2-inch (6.1 m) propeller. Six boilers provided steam to the engine at a working pressure of 25 psi (172 kPa; 2 kgf/cm^{2}). The engine produced a total of 3,560 indicated horsepower (2,650 kW). During her sea trials on 18 September 1865 Valiant had a maximum speed of 12.65 knots (23.43 km/h; 14.56 mph). The ship carried 450 long tons (460 t) of coal, enough to steam 800 nautical miles (1,500 km; 920 mi) at full speed.

The ship was barque-rigged and had a sail area of 24,500 square feet (2,276 m^{2}). Her funnel was semi-retractable to reduce wind resistance while under sail alone. She was designed to allow the ship's propeller to be hoisted up into the stern of the ship to reduce drag while under sail, but the hoisting gear was never fitted.

=== Armament ===
The armament of the Hector-class ships was intended to be 32 smoothbore, muzzle-loading 68-pounder guns, 15 on each side on the main deck and one each fore and aft as chase guns on the upper deck. This was modified during construction to eight rifled 110-pounder breech-loading guns and twenty-four 68-pounders. The breech-loading guns were a new design from Armstrong and much was hoped for them. Firing tests carried out in September 1861 against an armoured target, however, proved that the 110-pounder was inferior to the 68-pounder smoothbore gun in armour penetration and repeated incidents of breech explosions during the Battles for Shimonoseki and the Bombardment of Kagoshima in 1863–1864 caused the navy to withdraw the gun from service shortly afterwards.

Due to her extended construction time, Valiant never received the breech loaders, and was armed with sixteen 7-inch (178 mm) and two 8-inch (203 mm) rifled muzzle-loading guns. The two 8-inch guns were mounted on the quarterdeck where they could be fought in all weathers and four 7-inch guns were also fitted on the upper deck. The remaining twelve 7-inch guns were carried on the main deck. The shell of the 15-calibre 8-inch gun weighed 175 pounds (79.4 kg) while the gun itself weighed 9 long tons (9.1 t). It had a muzzle velocity of 1,410 ft/s (430 m/s) and was credited with the ability to penetrate a nominal 9.6 inches (244 mm) of wrought iron armour at the muzzle. The 16-calibre 7-inch gun weighed 6.5 long tons (6.6 t) and fired a 112 pounds (50.8 kg) shell. It was credited with the nominal ability to penetrate 7.7-inch (196 mm) armour.

=== Armour ===
The Hector-class ships had a wrought-iron waterline armour belt, 4.5 inches (114 mm) thick, that covered 216 feet (65.8 m) amidships and left the bow and stern unprotected. To protect against raking fire the belt was closed off by 4.5-inch transverse bulkheads at each end at lower deck level. The armour extended to 5 feet 8 inches (1.7 m) below the waterline. The main deck was protected by a strake of armour that ran the full length of the ship. Amidships, it was 4.5-inch thick for a length of 216 feet and tapered to a thickness of 2.5 inches (64 mm) to the ends of the ship. The armour was backed by 18 inches (460 mm) of teak. The lack of armour at the stern meant that the steering gear was very vulnerable.

== Service history ==
HMS Valiant was laid down on 1 February 1861 by Westwood, Baillie in Cubitt Town. This company went bankrupt in November 1861 and was ultimately bought by Thames Ironworks, which delayed the ship's launching until 14 October 1863. In August 1865, after Valiant had been towed to Portsmouth for fitting out, the ship was inspected by French officers during a port visit by ironclads of the French Navy. Production of the new muzzle-loaded rifles was slow and ships already in commission had priority so Valiant was not commissioned until September 1868, nearly five years after she was launched.

After Valiant was commissioned she became the First Reserve guard ship in Southern Ireland, where she remained until 1885, an experience unique among the British ironclads, although she did have one break to have new boilers installed.

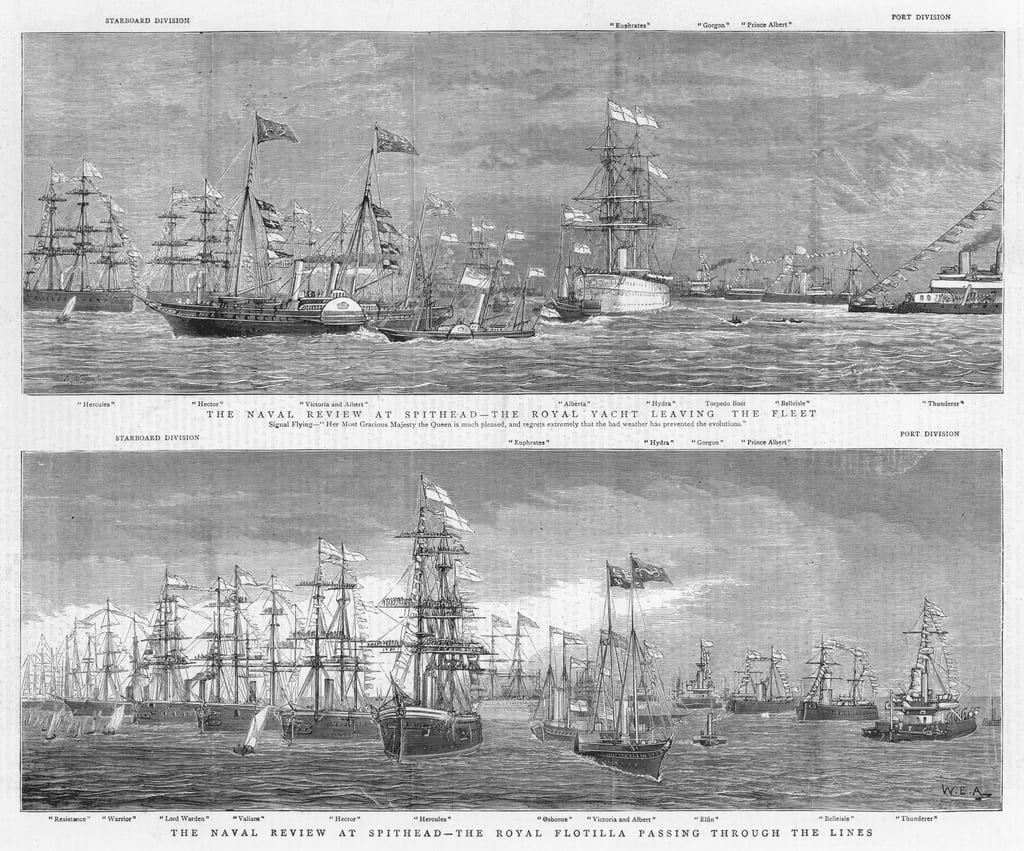
Valiant featured at the Naval Review at Spithead in 1878. The Graphic

From June to August 1878 the ship formed part of the Particular Service Squadron at the time of the Russian war scare during the Russo-Turkish War of 1877–1878, and sailed up the Dardanelles under the command of Admiral Hornby.

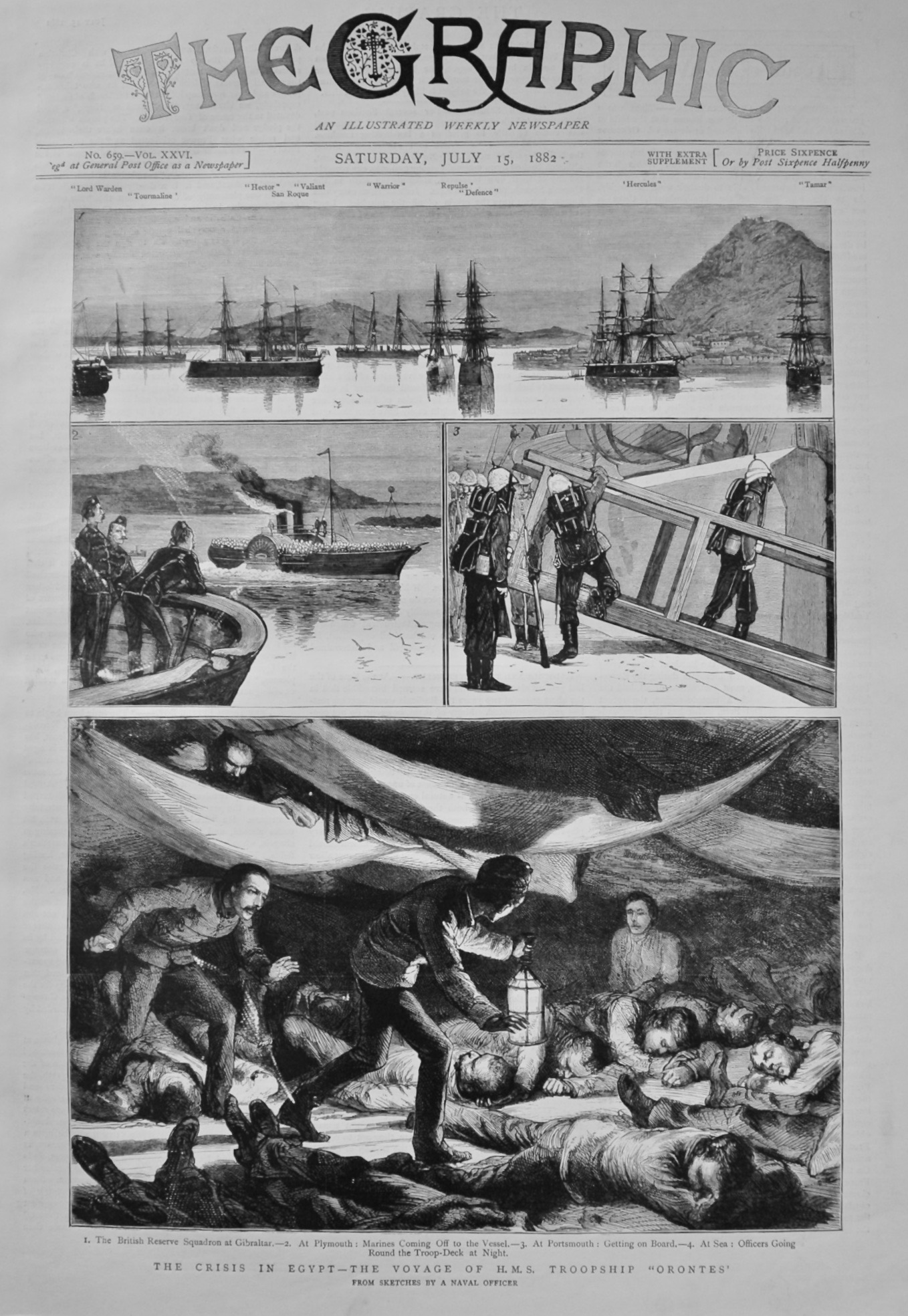
Valiant in Egypt. The Graphic 1882

On 20 July 1884 Valiant was accidentally rammed by the ironclad HMS Defence in Lough Swilly, damaging her hull and tearing off her boats, davits and fittings on one side of the ship. Valiant was paid off in 1885, and saw no further front-line service; lying for thirteen years in a partially dismantled state at Devonport. In 1897 she was assigned to the stoker training establishment HMS Indus, briefly losing her name, before being renamed as Indus IV in 1904. The ship was converted to a kite balloon storeship in 1915, during World War I, and her name was changed to HMS Valiant III. She was offered for sale in 1922, but there were no takers so that she was converted into a floating oil tank in 1926 and towed to Hamoaze, where she remained until 1956. Valiant was sold in that year to Belgian ship breakers and towed to Bruges on 8 December 1956.
