= HMS Hector (1862) =

British lead ship of Hector-class

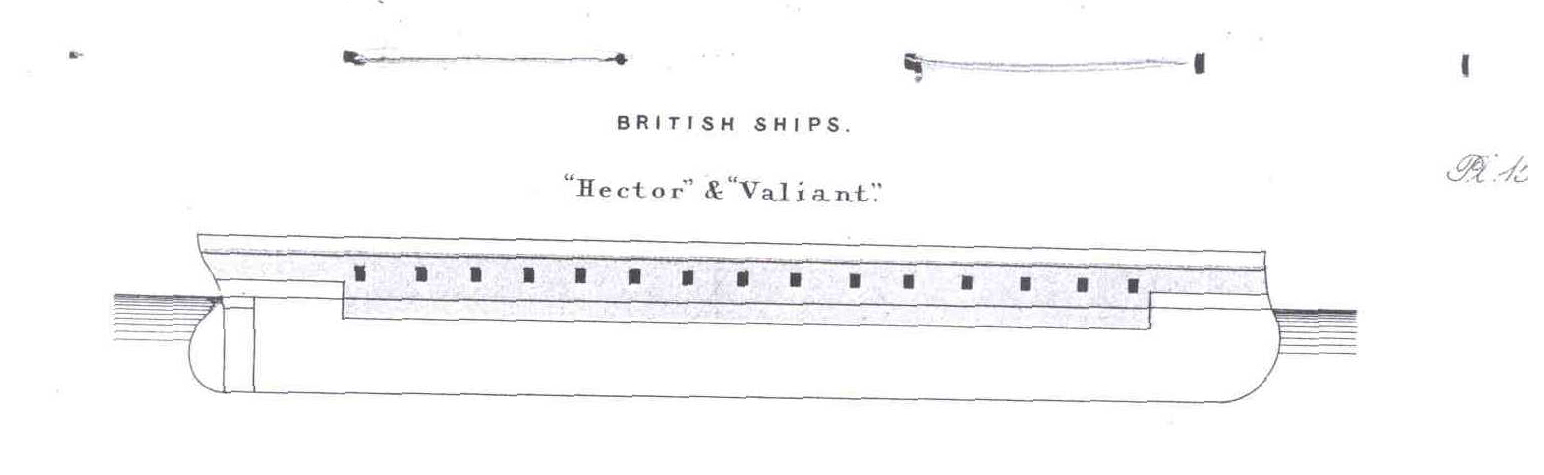
- Line drawing from Brassey's Naval Annual 1888

History

United Kingdom
- Name: Hector
- Namesake: Hector
- Ordered: 25 January 1861
- Builder: Robert Napier and Sons, Govan
- Cost: £294,000
- Laid down: 8 March 1861
- Launched: 26 September 1862
- Completed: 22 February 1864
- Commissioned: January 1864
- Refit: 1867–1868
- Fate: Sold for scrap, 1905

General characteristics (Hector)
- Class & type: Hector-class armoured frigate
- Displacement: 7,000 long tons (7,100 t)
- Length: 280 ft 2 in (85.4 m)
- Beam: 56 ft 5 in (17.2 m)
- Draught: 26 ft (7.9 m)
- Installed power: 3,256 ihp (2,428 kW)
- Propulsion: 1 shaft, 1 HRCR steam engine
- Sail plan: Barque-rigged
- Speed: 12 knots (22 km/h; 14 mph)
- Range: 800 nmi (1,500 km; 920 mi) at 12 knots (22 km/h; 14 mph)
- Complement: 530
- Armament: As built: 4 × 110 pdr (7 in (178 mm)) rifled breech-loading (RBL) guns; 20 × 68-pdr smoothbore guns; From 1868: 16 × 7 in rifled muzzle-loading (RML) guns; 2 × 8 in (203 mm) RMLs
- Armour: Belt: 2.5–4.5 in (64–114 mm); Bulkheads: 4.5 in (114 mm)

HMS Hector was the lead ship of the Hector-class armoured frigates ordered by the Royal Navy in 1861. Upon completion in 1864, she was assigned to the Channel Fleet. The ship was paid off in 1867 to refit and be re-armed. Upon recommissioning in 1868, she was assigned as the guard ship of the Fleet Reserve in the southern district until 1886. She usually served as Queen Victoria's guard ship when the sovereign was resident at her vacation home on the Isle of Wight. Hector was paid off in 1886 and hulked in 1900 as a storage ship before being sold for scrap in 1905.

== Design and description ==
The Hector-class ironclads, (Note: Ironclad is the all-encompassing term for armored warships of this period. Armoured frigates were basically designed for the same role as traditional wooden frigates, but this later changed as the size and expense of these ships forced them to be used in the line of battle.) like their immediate predecessors, the Defence-class, were designed as smaller and cheaper versions of the Warrior-class armoured frigates. They were modified versions of the Defence-class ships with additional armour and more powerful engines.

HMS Hector was 280 feet 2 inches (85.4 m) long between perpendiculars. She had a beam of 56 feet 5 inches (17.2 m) and a draft of 26 feet (7.9 m). The ship was 300 long tons (300 t) overweight and displaced 7,000 long tons (7,100 t). The hull was subdivided by watertight transverse bulkheads into 92 compartments and had a double bottom underneath the engine and boiler rooms. The ships were designed with a very low centre of gravity and had a metacentric height of 4 feet 6 inches (1.4 m). While handy in manoeuvering, they rolled quite badly.

=== Propulsion ===
Hector had one 2-cylinder horizontal return connecting rod steam engine made by Robert Napier and Sons driving a single 20-foot (6.1 m) propeller. Six boilers provided steam to the engine at a working pressure of 22 psi (152 kPa; 2 kgf/cm^{2}). The engine produced a total of 3,256 indicated horsepower (2,428 kW). During sea trials on 23 February 1864, Hector had a maximum speed of 12.36 knots (22.89 km/h; 14.22 mph). The ship carried 450 long tons (460 t) of coal, enough to steam 800 nautical miles (1,500 km; 920 mi) at full speed. Hector was the first British ironclad to have her machinery made by her builders.

The ship was barque-rigged and had a sail area of 24,500 square feet (2,276 m^{2}). Her funnel was semi-retractable to reduce wind resistance while under sail alone. She was designed to allow the ship's propeller to be hoisted up into the stern of the ship to reduce drag while under sail, but the hoisting gear was never fitted.

=== Armament ===
The armament of the Hector-class ships was intended to be 32 smoothbore, muzzle-loading 68-pounder guns, 15 on each side on the main deck and one each fore and aft as chase guns on the upper deck. This was modified during construction to four rifled 110-pounder breech-loading guns and twenty-four 68-pounders. The breech-loading guns were a new design from Armstrong and much was hoped for them. To partially alleviate their overweight condition, the ships were not fully armed and only received four 110-pounders on the upper deck and twenty 68-pounders on the main deck behind armour. Firing tests carried out in September 1861 against an armoured target, however, proved that the 110-pounder was inferior to the 68-pounder smoothbore gun in armour penetration and repeated incidents of breech explosions during the Battles for Shimonoseki and the Bombardment of Kagoshima in 1863–1864 caused the navy to withdraw the gun from service shortly afterwards.

The 7.9-inch (201 mm) solid shot of the 68-pounder gun weighed approximately 68 pounds (30.8 kg) while the gun itself weighed 10,640 pounds (4,826 kg). The gun had a muzzle velocity of 1,579 ft/s (481 m/s) and had a range of 3,200 yards (2,900 m) at an elevation of 12°. The 7-inch (178 mm) shell of the 110-pounder Armstrong breech-loader weighed 107–110 pounds (48.5–49.9 kg). It had a muzzle velocity of 1,150 ft/s (350 m/s) and, at an elevation of 11.25°, a maximum range of 4,000 yards (3,700 m). The 110-pounder gun weighed 9,520 pounds (4,318 kg). All of the guns could fire both solid shot and explosive shells.

Hector was rearmed during her 1867–1868 refit with sixteen 7-inch and two 8-inch (203 mm) rifled muzzle-loading guns. The two 8-inch guns were mounted on the quarterdeck where they could be fought in all weathers and four 7-inch guns were also fitted on the upper deck. The remaining twelve 7-inch guns were carried on the main deck. The shell of the 15-calibre 8-inch gun weighed 175 pounds (79.4 kg) while the gun itself weighed 9 long tons (9.1 t). It had a muzzle velocity of 1,410 ft/s (430 m/s) and was credited with the ability to penetrate a nominal 9.6 inches (244 mm) of wrought iron armour at the muzzle. The 16-calibre 7-inch gun weighed 6.5 long tons (6.6 t) and fired a 112 pounds (50.8 kg) shell. It was credited with the nominal ability to penetrate 7.7-inch (196 mm) armour.

=== Armour ===
The Hector-class ships had a wrought-iron waterline armour belt, 4.5 inches (114 mm) thick, that covered 216 feet (65.8 m) amidships and left the bow and stern unprotected. To protect against raking fire the belt was closed off by 4.5-inch transverse bulkheads at each end at lower deck level. The armour extended to 5 feet 8 inches (1.7 m) below the waterline. The main deck was protected by a strake of armour that ran the full length of the ship. Amidships, it was 4.5-inch thick for a length of 216 feet and tapered to a thickness of 2.5 inches (64 mm) to the ends of the ship. The armour was backed by 18 inches (460 mm) of teak. The lack of armour at the stern meant that the steering gear was very vulnerable.

== Service ==
HMS Hector was laid down on 8 March 1861 by Robert Napier and Sons at their shipyard in Govan. She was launched on 26 September 1862 and commissioned on 22 February 1864. She cost £294,000 to build, including a payment of £35,000 to her builders who had underestimated their costs. She served with the Channel Fleet until 1867, when she was paid off to be re-armed and to refit.

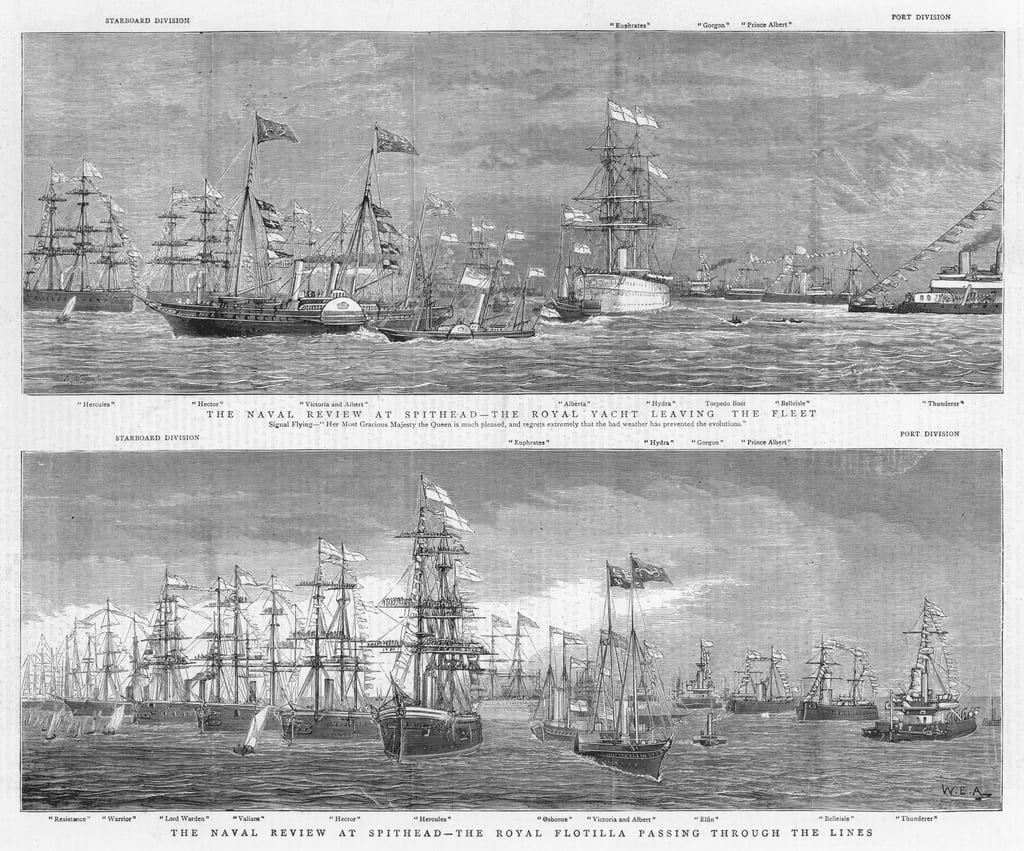
Hector featured at the Naval Review at Spithead in 1878. The Graphic

She formed part of the Southern Reserve Fleet between 1868 until 1886; during this time her only military activity occurred when she was detailed to service in the Particular Service Squadron under the command of Admiral Hornsby during the Russian war scare of June–August 1878. Hector was assigned as Queen Victoria's guard ship nearly every summer during this period when the Queen, and her family, were in residence in Osborne House on the Isle of Wight. She was paid off at Portsmouth in 1886 and remained there, partly dismantled, until 1900 when she briefly became part of the torpedo school HMS Vernon as a store hulk. Hector became the first British warship to have wireless telegraphy installed when she conducted the first trials of the new equipment for the Royal Navy. The ship was sold for scrap in 1905.
