= Hector-class ironclad =

Pair of Royal Navy armoured frigates built in the 1860s

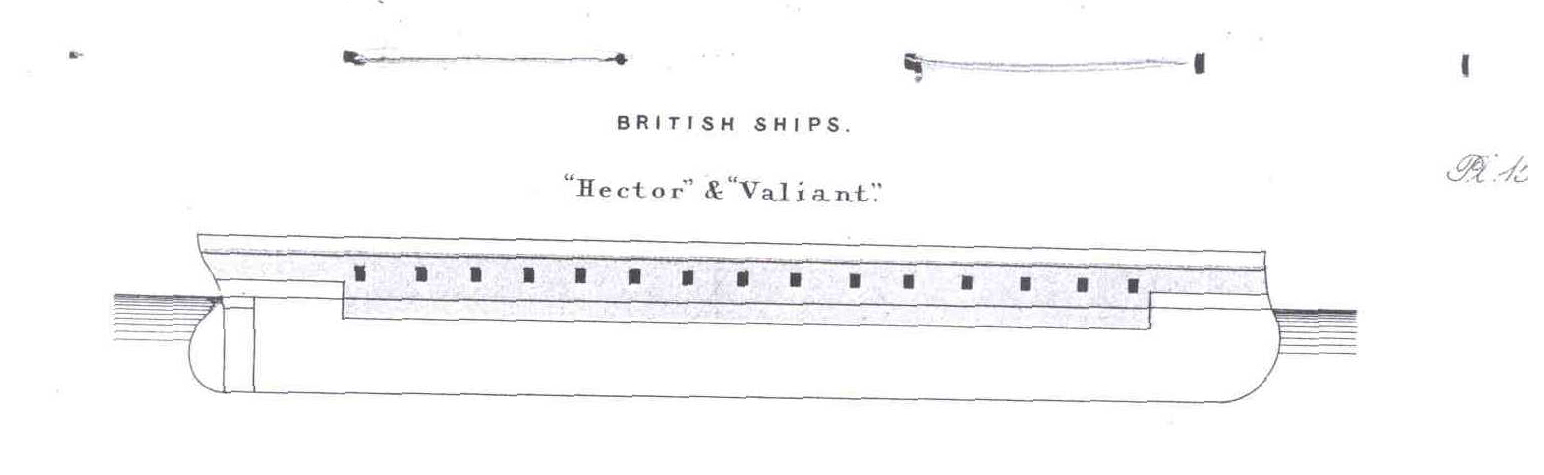
- Line drawing from Brassey's Naval Annual 1888

Class overview
- Operators: Royal Navy
- Preceded by: Defence-class ironclad
- Succeeded by: HMS Achilles
- Built: 1861–1868
- In commission: 1864–1886
- Completed: 2
- Scrapped: 2

General characteristics
- Type: Armoured frigate
- Displacement: 7,000 long tons (7,100 t)
- Length: 280 ft 2 in (85.4 m)
- Beam: 56 ft 5 in (17.2 m)
- Draught: 26 ft 2 in (8 m)
- Installed power: 6 boilers; 3,260–3,560 ihp (2,430–2,650 kW)
- Propulsion: 1 shaft; 1 HRCR steam engine
- Sail plan: Barque-rig
- Speed: 12 knots (22 km/h; 14 mph)
- Range: 800 nmi (1,500 km; 920 mi) at 12 knots (22 km/h; 14 mph)
- Complement: 530
- Armament: As built: 4 × 110 pdr (7 in (178 mm)) rifled breech-loading (RBL) guns; 20 × 68-pdr smoothbore guns; From 1868: 16 × 7 in rifled muzzle-loading (RML) guns; 2 × 8 in (203 mm) RMLs
- Armour: Belt: 2.5–4.5 in (64–114 mm); Bulkheads: 4.5 in (114 mm)

The Hector-class ironclads were a pair of armoured frigates built for the Royal Navy (RN) in the 1860s. Hector was completed in 1864 and assigned to the Channel Fleet until she began a refit in 1867. Valiant's builder went bankrupt, delaying her launching by a year. The ship then had to wait almost another five years to receive her guns and be commissioned. Both ships were assigned to the Reserve Fleet from 1868 until they were paid off in 1885–1886. They were mobilized during the Russo-Turkish War of 1877–1878, but saw no action. They were hulked in the late 1890s and assigned to shore establishments. Hector was scrapped in 1905, but Valiant was converted into a floating oil tank in 1926; she was sold for scrap thirty years later.

== Design and description ==
The Hector-class ironclads, like their immediate predecessors, the Defence class, were designed as smaller and cheaper versions of the Warrior-class armoured frigates. They were modified versions of the Defence class with additional armour and more powerful engines.

The ships were 280 feet 2 inches (85.4 m) long between perpendiculars, had a beam of 56 feet 5 inches (17.2 m) and a draft of 26 feet 2 inches (8 m). They were 300 long tons (300 t) overweight and displaced 7,000 long tons (7,100 t). The hull was subdivided by watertight transverse bulkheads into 92 compartments and had a double bottom underneath the engine and boiler rooms. The ships were designed with a very low centre of gravity and had a metacentric height of 4 feet 6 inches (1.4 m). While handy in manoeuvring they rolled quite badly. The ships had a crew of 530 officers and ratings.

=== Propulsion ===
Each of the Hector-class ships had one 2-cylinder horizontal return connecting-rod steam engine driving a single 18-foot (5.5 m) propeller. Six boilers provided steam to the engine at a working pressure of 22–25 psi (152–172 kPa; 2–2 kgf/cm^{2}). The engine produced a total of 3,256–3,560 indicated horsepower (2,428–2,655 kW). During her sea trials on 23 February 1864, Hector had a maximum speed of 12.36 knots (22.89 km/h; 14.22 mph) and Valiant made 12.65 knots (23.43 km/h; 14.56 mph) on 18 September 1865. The ships carried only 450 long tons (460 t) of coal because they were overweight, enough to steam 800 nautical miles (1,500 km; 920 mi) at full speed.

The armoured frigates were barque-rigged and had a sail area of 24,500 square feet (2,276 m^{2}). Their funnel was semi-retractable to reduce wind resistance while under sail alone. They was designed to allow their propeller to be hoisted up into the stern of the ship to reduce drag while under sail, but the hoisting gear was never fitted on either ship.

=== Armament ===
The armament of the Hector-class ships was intended to be 32 smoothbore, muzzle-loading 68-pounder guns, 15 on each side on the main deck and one each fore and aft as chase guns on the upper deck. This was modified during Hector's construction to four rifled 110-pounder breech-loading guns mounted on the upper deck and twenty-four 68-pounders on the broadside. Valiant, due to the delays in her construction and a shortage of guns, never received any of these guns. The breech-loading guns were a new design from Armstrong and much was hoped for them. To partially alleviate their overweight condition the ships were not fully armed and only received four 110-pounders on the upper deck and twenty 68-pounders on the main deck behind armour. Firing tests carried out in September 1861 against an armoured target, however, proved that the 110-pounder was inferior to the 68-pounder smoothbore gun in armour penetration and repeated incidents of breech explosions during the Battles for Shimonoseki and the Bombardment of Kagoshima in 1863–64 caused the navy to withdraw the gun from service shortly afterwards.

The 7.9-inch (201 mm) solid shot of the 68-pounder gun weighed approximately 68 pounds (30.8 kg) while the gun itself weighed 10,640 pounds (4,826 kg). The gun had a muzzle velocity of 1,579 ft/s (481 m/s) and had a range of 3,200 yards (2,900 m) at an elevation of 12°. The 7-inch (178 mm) shell of the 110-pounder Armstrong breech-loader weighed 107–110 pounds (48.5–49.9 kg). It had a muzzle velocity of 1,150 ft/s (350 m/s) and, at an elevation of 11.25°, a maximum range of 4,000 yards (3,700 m). The 110-pounder gun weighed 9,520 pounds (4,318.2 kg). All of the guns could fire both solid shot and explosive shells.

Hector was rearmed during her 1867–1868 refit with sixteen 7-inch and two 8-inch (203 mm) rifled muzzle-loading guns. Valiant received these guns as her initial armament. The two 8-inch guns were mounted on the quarterdeck where they could be fought in all weathers and four 7-inch guns were also fitted on the upper deck. The remaining twelve 7-inch guns were carried on the main deck. The shell of the 15-calibre 8-inch gun weighed 175 pounds (79.4 kg) while the gun itself weighed 9 long tons (9.1 t). It had a muzzle velocity of 1,410 ft/s (430 m/s) and was credited with the ability to penetrate 9.6 inches (244 mm) of wrought iron armour at the muzzle. The 16-calibre 7-inch gun weighed 6.5 long tons (6.6 t) and fired a 112 pounds (50.8 kg) shell. It was credited with the nominal ability to penetrate 7.7-inch (196 mm) armour.

=== Armour ===
The Hector-class ships had a wrought iron waterline armour belt, 4.5 inches (114 mm) thick, that covered 216 feet (65.8 m) amidships and left the bow and stern unprotected. To protect against raking fire the belt was closed off by 4.5-inch transverse bulkheads at each end at lower deck level. The armour extended to 5 feet 8 inches (1.7 m) below the waterline. The main deck was protected by a strake of armour that ran the full length of the ship. Amidships, it was 4.5-inch thick for a length of 216 feet and tapered to a thickness of 2.5 inches (64 mm) to the ends of the ship. The armour was backed by 18 inches (460 mm) of teak. The lack of armour at the stern meant that the steering gear was very vulnerable.

== Ships ==
| Ship | Builder | Laid down | Launched | Completed | Fate | Cost |
|---|---|---|---|---|---|---|
| Hector | Robert Napier and Sons, Govan | March 1861 | 26 September 1862 | 22 February 1864 | Sold for scrap, 11 July 1905 | £294,000 |
| Valiant | Westwood, Baillie, Cubitt Town and Thames Ironworks, Blackwall, London | February 1861 | 14 October 1863 | 15 September 1868 | Scrapped, 1956 | £325,000 |

== Construction and service ==
Whilst Valiant was under construction, Westwood, Baillie went bankrupt in November 1861 and their shipyard was taken over by the Thames Ironworks. This delayed her launching by about a year and a shortage of muzzle-loading guns delayed her completion by nearly five years. Hector, in contrast, served with the Channel Fleet from commissioning until 1867, when she was paid off to be re-armed and to refit. She formed part of the Southern Reserve Fleet between 1868 until 1886 much like Valiant's service as the First Reserve guard ship in Southern Ireland after her commissioning, where she remained until 1885. Both ships did little of significance until they were assigned to the Particular Service Squadron, commanded by Admiral Geoffrey Hornby, from June to August 1878 during the Russian war scare during the Russo-Turkish War.

Hector was assigned as Queen Victoria's guard ship nearly every summer during this period when the Queen and her family, were in residence in Osborne House on the Isle of Wight. She was paid off at Portsmouth in 1886 and remained there until 1900 when she briefly became part of the torpedo school HMS Vernon as a store hulk. Hector became the first British warship to have wireless telegraphy installed when she conducted the first trials of the new equipment for the Royal Navy.

Valiant was paid off in 1885, and she was assigned to the stoker training establishment HMS Indus in 1897, briefly losing her name, before being renamed as Indus IV in 1904. The ship was converted to a kite balloon storeship in 1915, during World War I, and her name was changed to HMS Valiant III. She was offered for sale in 1922, but there were no takers so the ship was converted into a floating oil tank in 1926 and towed to Hamoaze.
