= HMS Resistance (1861) =

British defence-class ironclads

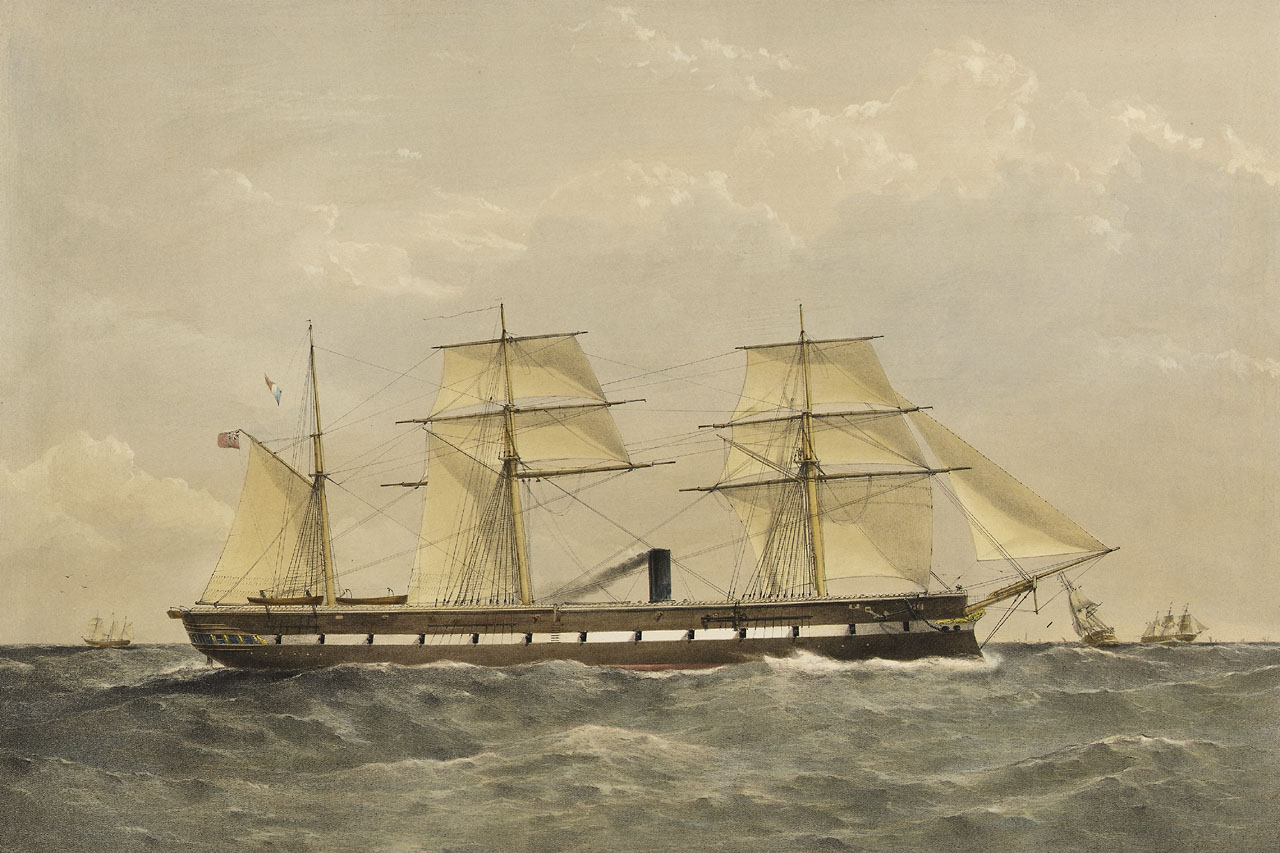
- Resistance in 1861, by Thomas Goldsworthy Dutton

History

United Kingdom
- Ordered: 14 December 1859
- Builder: Westwood, Baillie, Poplar, London
- Laid down: 21 December 1859
- Launched: 11 April 1861
- Completed: 5 October 1862
- Commissioned: July 1862
- Decommissioned: 1880
- Nickname(s): Old Rammo
- Fate: Sold for scrap, 11 November 1898

General characteristics
- Class & type: Defence-class armoured frigate
- Displacement: 6,070 long tons (6,170 t)
- Length: 280 ft (85.3 m)
- Beam: 54 ft 2 in (16.5 m)
- Draught: 26 ft 2 in (8 m)
- Installed power: 4 boilers; 2,328 ihp (1,736 kW)
- Propulsion: 1 shaft, 1 trunk steam engine
- Sail plan: Ship rig
- Speed: 11 knots (20 km/h; 13 mph)
- Range: 1,670 nmi (3,090 km; 1,920 mi) at 10 knots (19 km/h; 12 mph)
- Complement: 460
- Armament: 2 × 32 pdr smoothbore guns; 8 × 7 in (178 mm) RBLs; 10 × 68 pdr smoothbore guns; From 1868 : 14 × 7 in rifled muzzle-loading (RML) guns; 2 × 8 in (203 mm) RMLs
- Armour: Belt: 4.5 in (114 mm); Bulkheads: 4.5 in (114 mm)

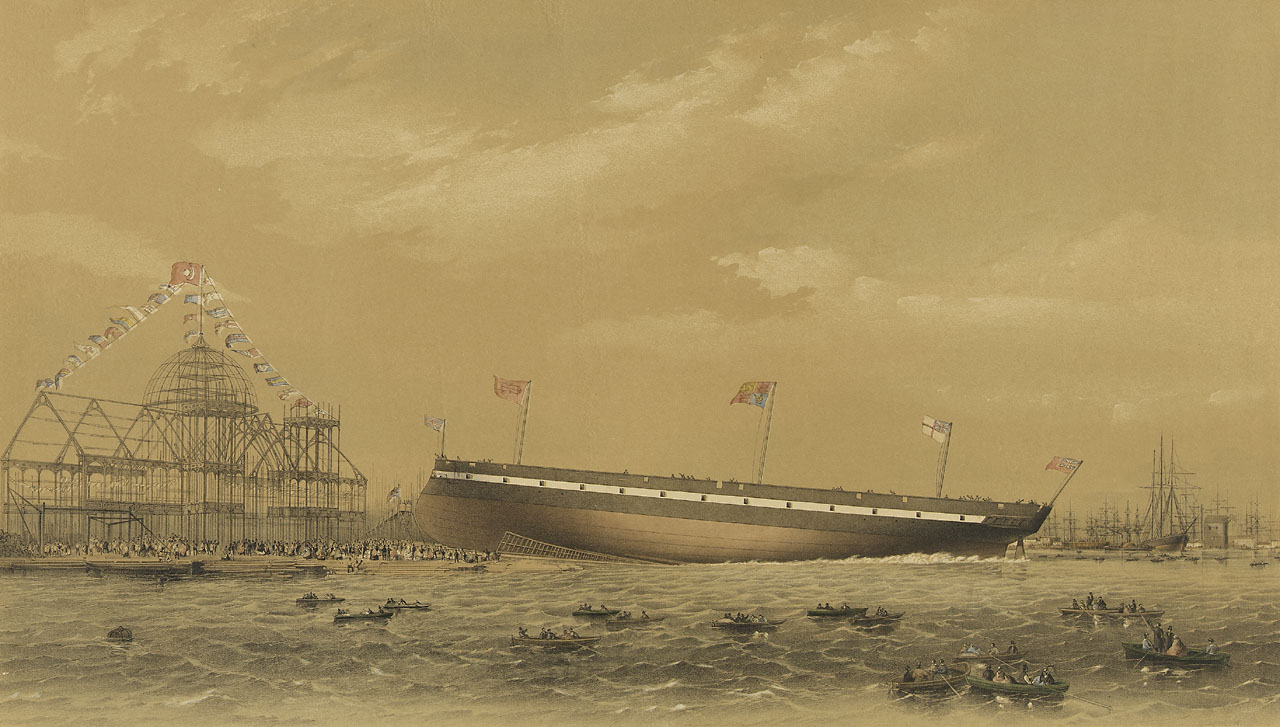
A lithograph of the launching of Resistance, 11 April 1861

HMS Resistance was the second of two Defence-class ironclads (Note: Ironclad is the all-encompassing term for armored warships of this period. Armoured frigates were basically designed for the same role as traditional wooden frigates, but this later changed as the size and expense of these ships forced them to be used in the line of battle.) built for the Royal Navy in the 1860s. She was the first capital ship in the Royal Navy to be fitted with a ram and was given the nickname of Old Rammo. Resistance was initially assigned to the Channel Fleet upon commissioning, but was transferred to the Mediterranean Fleet in 1864, the first ironclad to be assigned to that fleet. She was rearmed in 1867 and became a guardship when recommissioned in 1869. The ship was reassigned to the Channel Fleet in 1873 before reverting to her former duties in 1877. Resistance was decommissioned in 1880 and was used for gunnery and torpedo trials beginning in 1885. The ship was sold for scrap in 1898 and foundered in 1899 en route to the breaker's yard. She was salvaged and later scrapped.

== Design and description ==
The Defence-class ironclads were designed as smaller and cheaper versions of the Warrior-class armoured frigates. This meant that they could not fit the same powerful engines of the Warrior-class ships and were therefore 2 knots (3.7 km/h; 2.3 mph) slower and had far fewer guns. The naval architect Sir Nathaniel Barnaby, a future Constructor of the Navy, considered that, in terms of combat, a Defence-class ship was worth one quarter of a Warrior.

HMS Resistance was 280 feet (85.3 m) long between perpendiculars and 291 feet 4 inches (88.8 m) long overall. She had a beam of 54 feet 2 inches (16.51 m) and a draft of 26 feet 2 inches (8 m). The ship displaced 6,070 long tons (6,170 t) and had a ram in the shape of a plough, the first capital ship in the Royal Navy to be fitted with one. The hull was subdivided by watertight transverse bulkheads into 92 compartments and had a double bottom underneath the engine and boiler rooms. Resistance was 128 feet 8 inches (39.2 m) shorter overall and displaced over 3,000 long tons (3,000 t) less than the Warrior-class ironclads.

=== Propulsion ===
The Defence-class ships had a single two-cylinder trunk steam engine made by John Penn and Sons driving a single 21-foot (6.4 m) propeller. Four rectangular boilers provided steam to the engine at a working pressure of 20 psi (138 kPa; 1 kgf/cm^{2}). The engine produced a total of 2,329 indicated horsepower (1,737 kW). During sea trials on 25 August 1873, Resistance had a maximum speed of 11.4 knots (21.1 km/h; 13.1 mph). The ship carried 450 long tons (460 t) of coal, enough to steam 1,670 nautical miles (3,090 km; 1,920 mi) at 10 knots (19 km/h; 12 mph).

The ironclad was ship rigged and had a sail area of 24,500 square feet (2,276 m^{2}). The lower masts and bowsprit were made of iron to withstand the shock of ramming. Resistance could make about 10.5 knots (19.4 km/h; 12.1 mph) under sail and the funnel was semi-retractable to reduce wind resistance while under sail alone. The ship's propeller could be hoisted up into the stern of the ship to reduce drag while under sail. She was re-rigged as a barque from September 1864 to April 1866 before returning to her original ship rig.

=== Armament ===
The armament of the Defence-class ships was intended to be 18 smoothbore, muzzle-loading 68-pounder guns, eight on each side on the main deck and one each fore and aft as chase guns on the upper deck, plus four rifled breech-loading 40-pounder guns as saluting guns. This was modified during construction to six rifled 110-pounder breech-loading guns, ten 68-pounders and two 32-pounder smoothbore guns, the only such weapons ever mounted in a British ironclad. Both breech-loading guns were new designs from Armstrong and much was hoped of them. Four of the 110-pounder guns were installed on the main deck amidships and the other two became chase guns; all of the 68-pounder guns were mounted on the main deck. Firing tests carried out in September 1861 against an armoured target, however, proved that the 110-pounder was inferior to the 68-pounder smoothbore gun in armour penetration and repeated incidents of breech explosions during the Battles for Shimonoseki and the Bombardment of Kagoshima in 1863–1864 caused the navy to begin to withdraw the gun from service shortly afterwards.

The 7.9-inch (201 mm) solid shot of the 68-pounder gun weighed approximately 68 pounds (30.8 kg) while the gun itself weighed 10,640 pounds (4,826 kg). The gun had a muzzle velocity of 1,579 ft/s (481 m/s) and had a range of 3,200 yards (2,900 m) at an elevation of 12°. The 7-inch (178 mm) shell of the 110-pounder Armstrong breech-loader weighed 107–110 pounds (48.5–49.9 kg). It had a muzzle velocity of 1,150 ft/s (350 m/s) and, at an elevation of 11.25°, a maximum range of 4,000 yards (3,700 m). The 110-pounder gun weighed 9,520 pounds (4,318 kg) while the 40-pounder weighed 3,584 pounds (1,626 kg). All of the guns could fire both solid shot and explosive shells.

Resistance was rearmed during her 1867–1868 refit with fourteen 7-inch and two 8-inch (203 mm) rifled muzzle-loading guns. The new guns were heavier so fewer could be carried. The shell of the 15-calibre 8-inch gun weighed 175 pounds (79.4 kg) while the gun itself weighed 9 long tons (9.1 t). It had a muzzle velocity of 1,410 ft/s (430 m/s) and was credited with the ability to penetrate a nominal 9.6 inches (244 mm) of wrought iron armour at the muzzle. The 16-calibre 7-inch gun weighed 6.5 long tons (6.6 t) and fired a 112 pounds (50.8 kg) shell. It was credited with the nominal ability to penetrate 7.7-inch (196 mm) armour.

=== Armour ===
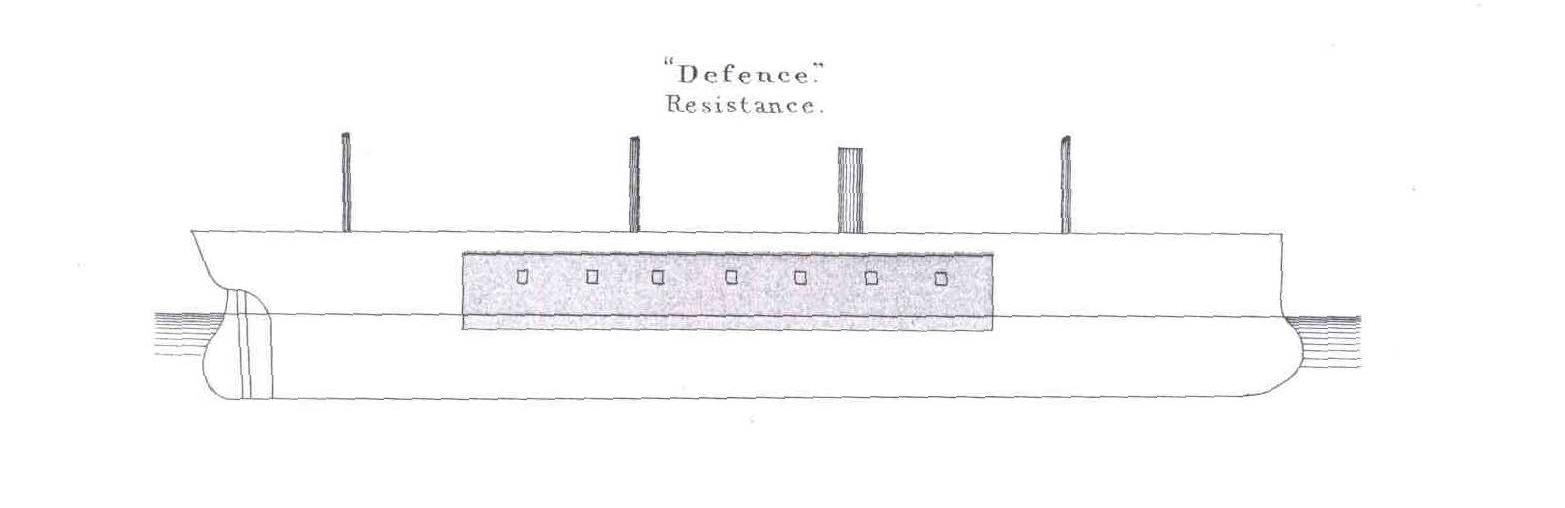
Right elevation plan of sister ship Defence from Brassey's Naval Annual, 1888; the shaded area shows the ship's armour

The Defence-class ships had a wrought-iron armour belt, 4.5 inches (114 mm) thick, that covered 140 feet (42.7 m) amidships. The armour extended from upper deck level to 6 feet (1.8 m) below the waterline. 4.5-inch transverse bulkheads protected the guns on the main deck. The armour was backed by 18 inches (460 mm) of teak. The ends of the ship were left entirely unprotected which meant that the steering gear was vulnerable. They were, however, sub-divided into watertight compartments to minimize any flooding.

== Construction and service ==
Resistance was ordered on 14 December 1859 and laid down a week later by Westwood, Baillie at their shipyard in Cubitt Town, London. She was launched on 11 April 1861, commissioned in July 1862 and completed on 5 October at the cost of £258,120. After completion she served in the Channel Fleet until 1864 when she was transferred to the Mediterranean Fleet, the first British ironclad assigned to that fleet. In 1867 the ship was paid off in Portsmouth for refit and re-armament. Resistance recommissioned in 1869 as guardship in the River Mersey and served there until 1873 when she returned to the Channel Fleet. In 1877 the ship resumed her post as Mersey guardship until she was paid off in 1880 at Devonport.

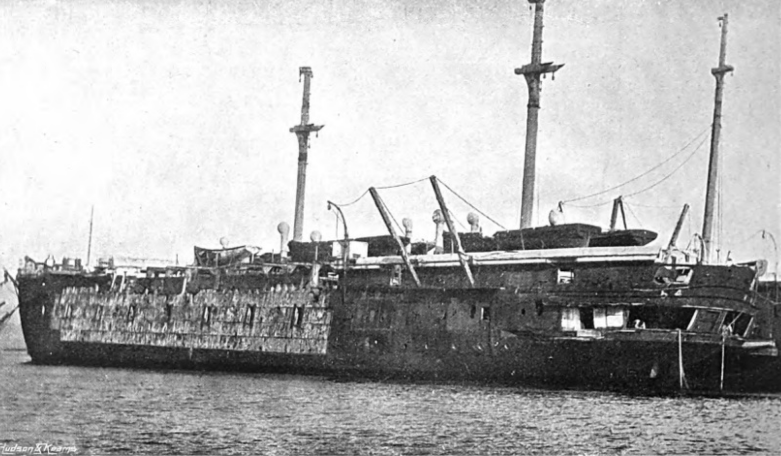
Resistance in use as a target ship c.1898

In 1885 Resistance began to be used as a target for the testing of armour against the effects of torpedoes and gunfire. On 3 February 1888, she sank in Portchester Creek following the test of a Whitehead torpedo.

== Disposal ==
Resistance was sold for scrap to J S Turnbull of Glasgow on 11 November 1898. On 4 February 1899 she departed Spithead in tow of the Liverpool tugs Pathfinder and Wrestler for the Mersey, to be broken up. In a gale in the Irish Sea on 8 February, her steam steering engine failed due to a boiler problem, she shipped water in the forward compartments and the stokehold. In view of the leaks and the inability to steer, the tugs sought a port of refuge and brought her to anchor inside Holyhead Breakwater, in the outer harbour. Early the next morning it was realised that the ship was taking in more water and would founder where the water had a depth of 42 feet (13 m). To prevent a total loss and a potential danger to navigation, she was towed further into the harbour and put ashore in Penrhos Bay. (Note: According to Ballard, as well as Lyon & Winfield, and Colledge, Resistance foundered in Holyhead Bay whilst under tow to the breakers on 4 March 1899 and was later raised and scrapped at Garston, Merseyside)

After salvage operations, Resistance was refloated on 17 February and the tow to the Mersey completed. On 13 March she was beached at Oglet Point, near Garston, where she was broken up by the ironfounders Monks, Hall & Co, of Warrington.
