= Peter Neilson =

Peter Neilson may refer to:

- Peter Neilson (footballer) (1890 – after 1913), Scottish footballer
- Peter Neilson (poet) (1795–1861), Scottish businessman, author, and naval inventor
- Peter Neilson (politician born 1879) (1879–1948), New Zealand MP for Dunedin Central
- Peter Neilson (politician born 1954) (1954–2022), New Zealand MP for Miramar

== See also ==
- Peter Nielsen (disambiguation), multiple people
