= HMS Black Prince (1861) =

1861 Warrior-class ironclad ship

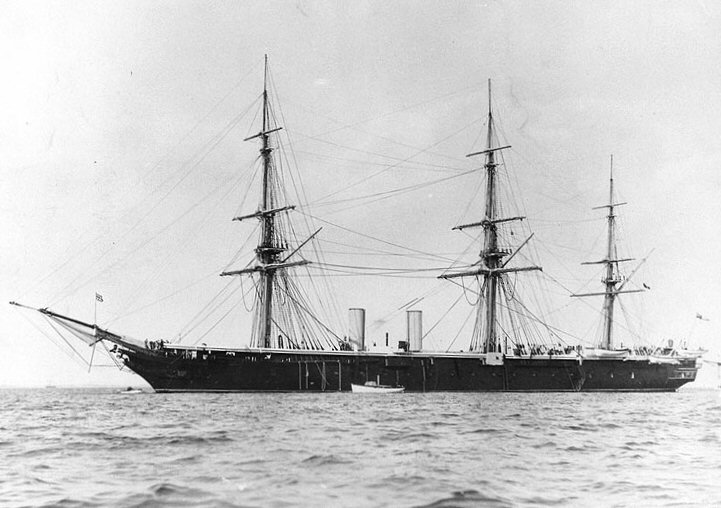
- Black Prince in the 1880s

History

United Kingdom
- Name: Black Prince
- Namesake: Edward, the Black Prince
- Ordered: 6 October 1859
- Builder: Robert Napier and Sons, Govan, Glasgow
- Laid down: 12 October 1859
- Launched: 27 February 1861
- Completed: 27 September 1862
- Commissioned: May 1862
- Renamed: Emerald, 1903; Impregnable III, 1910
- Reclassified: As a training ship, 1896
- Stricken: 1896
- Fate: Sold for scrap, 1923

General characteristics
- Class & type: Warrior class armoured frigate
- Displacement: 9,137 long tons (9,284 t)
- Length: 420 ft (128.0 m)
- Beam: 58 ft 4 in (17.8 m)
- Draught: 26 ft 10 in (8.2 m)
- Installed power: 5,772 ihp (4,304 kW); 10 rectangular boilers
- Propulsion: 1 shaft, 1 Trunk steam engine
- Sail plan: Ship rig
- Speed: 14 knots (26 km/h; 16 mph)
- Range: 2,100 nmi (3,900 km; 2,400 mi) at 11 kn (20 km/h; 13 mph)
- Complement: 707
- Armament: 26 × Smoothbore muzzle-loading 68-pounder (206 mm) guns; 10 × Rifled breechloading 110-pounder (178 mm) guns; 4 × Rifled breechloading 40-pounder (121 mm) guns
- Armour: Belt: 4.5 in (114 mm); Bulkheads: 4.5 in (114 mm)

HMS Black Prince was the third ship of that name to serve with the Royal Navy. She was the world's second ocean-going, iron-hulled, armoured warship, following her sister ship, HMS Warrior. For a brief period the two Warrior-class ironclads were the most powerful warships in the world, being virtually impregnable to the naval guns of the time. Rapid advances in naval technology left Black Prince and her sister obsolete within a short time, however, and she spent more time in reserve and training roles than in first-line service.

Black Prince spent her active career with the Channel Fleet and was hulked in 1896, becoming a harbour training ship in Queenstown, Ireland. She was renamed Emerald in 1903 and then Impregnable III in 1910 when she was assigned to the training establishment in Plymouth. The ship was sold for scrap in 1923.

== Design and description ==
HMS Black Prince was 380 feet 2 inches (115.9 m) long between perpendiculars and 420 feet (128.0 m) long overall. She had a beam of 58 feet 4 inches (17.8 m) and a draught of 26 feet 10 inches (8.2 m). The ship displaced 9,137 long tons (9,284 t). The hull was subdivided by watertight transverse bulkheads into 92 compartments and had a double bottom underneath the engine and boiler rooms.

=== Propulsion ===
The Warrior-class ships had one 2-cylinder trunk steam engine made by John Penn and Sons driving a single 24-foot-6-inch (7.5 m) propeller. Ten rectangular boilers provided steam to the engine at a working pressure of 20 psi (138 kPa; 1 kgf/cm^{2}). The engine produced a total of 5,772 indicated horsepower (4,304 kW) during Black Prince's sea trials in September 1862 and the ship had a maximum speed of 13.6 knots (25.2 km/h; 15.7 mph) under steam alone. The ship carried 800 long tons (810 t) of coal, enough to steam 2,100 nautical miles (3,900 km; 2,400 mi) at 11 knots (20 km/h; 13 mph).

The ironclads were ship rigged and had a sail area of 48,400 square feet (4,497 m^{2}). Black Prince could only do 11 knots (20 km/h; 13 mph) under sail, 2 knots (3.7 km/h; 2.3 mph) slower than her sister Warrior.

=== Armament ===
The armament of the Warrior-class ships was intended to be 40 smoothbore, muzzle-loading 68-pounder guns, 19 on each side on the main deck and one each fore and aft as chase guns on the upper deck. This was modified during construction to ten rifled 110-pounder breech-loading guns, twenty-six 68-pounders, and four rifled breech-loading 40-pounder guns.

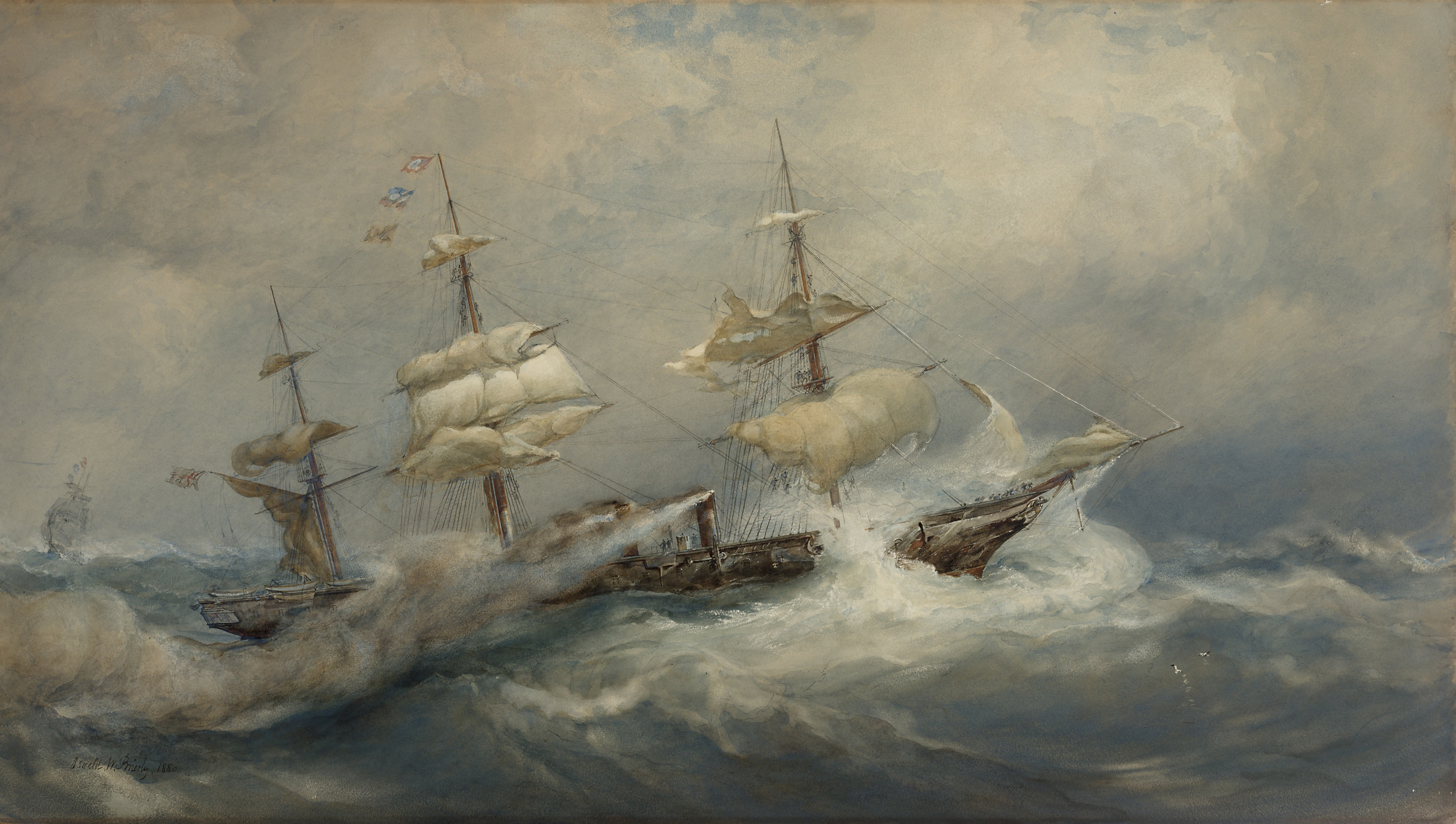
The 'Black Prince' in a storm, 1880 watercolour by Oswald W. Brierly

The 7.9-inch (201 mm) solid shot of the 68-pounder gun weighed approximately 68 pounds (30.8 kg) while the gun itself weighed 10,640 pounds (4,826 kg). The gun had a muzzle velocity of 1,579 ft/s (481 m/s) and had a range of 3,200 yards (2,900 m) at an elevation of 12°. The 7-inch (178 mm) shell of the 110-pounder Armstrong breech-loader weighed 107–110 pounds (48.5–49.9 kg). It had a muzzle velocity of 1,150 ft/s (350 m/s) and, at an elevation of 11.25°, a maximum range of 4,000 yards (3,700 m). The shell of the 40-pounder breech-loading gun was 4.75 inches (121 mm) in diameter and weighed 40 pounds (18.1 kg). The gun had a maximum range of 3,800 yards (3,500 m) at a muzzle velocity of 1,150 ft/s (350 m/s). In 1863–1864 the 40-pounder guns were replaced by a heavier version with the same ballistics. All of the guns could fire both solid shot and explosive shells.

Black Prince was rearmed during her 1867–1868 refit with twenty-four 7-inch and four 8-inch (203 mm) rifled muzzle-loading guns. The ship also received four 20-pounder breech-loading guns for use as saluting guns. The shell of the 15-calibre 8-inch gun weighed 175 pounds (79.4 kg) while the gun itself weighed 9 long tons (9.1 t). It had a muzzle velocity of 1,410 ft/s (430 m/s) and was credited with the ability to penetrate a nominal 9.6 inches (244 mm) of wrought iron armour at the muzzle. The 16-calibre 7-inch gun weighed 6.5 long tons (6.6 t) and fired a 112-pound (50.8 kg) shell. It was credited with the nominal ability to penetrate 7.7-inch (196 mm) armour.

=== Armour ===
The sides of Black Prince were protected by an armour belt of wrought iron, 4.5 inches (114 mm) thick, that covered the middle 213 feet (64.9 m) of the ship. The ends of the ship were left entirely unprotected, which meant that the steering gear was very vulnerable. The armour extended 16 feet (4.9 m) above the waterline and 6 feet (1.8 m) below it. 4.5-inch transverse bulkheads protected the guns on the main deck. The armour was backed by 16 inches (406 mm) of teak.

== Construction and service ==
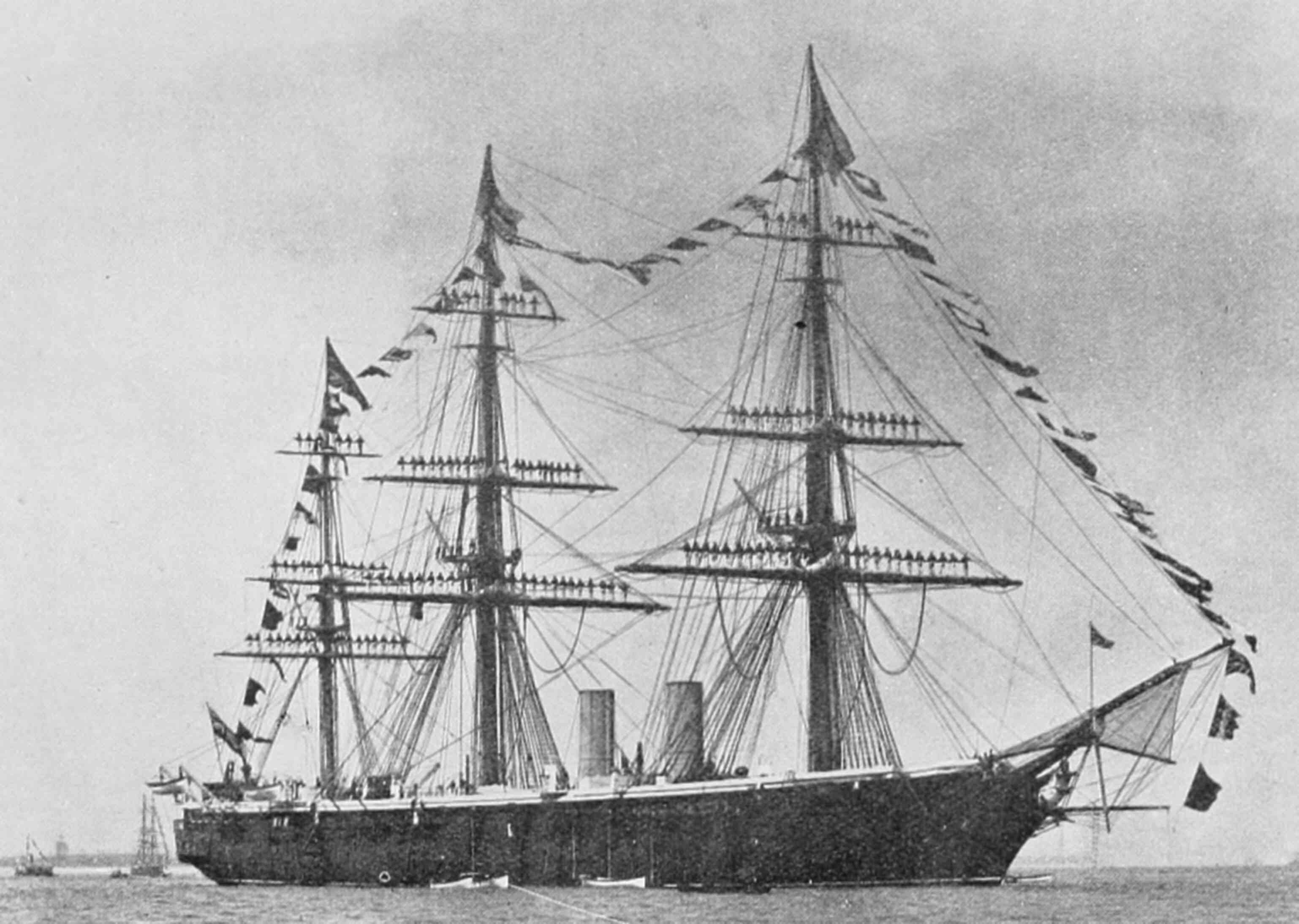
Black Prince with masts manned by sailors

Black Prince was ordered on 6 October 1859 from Robert Napier and Sons in Govan, Glasgow, for the price of £377,954. The ship was laid down on 12 October 1859 and launched 27 February 1861. On 10 March, she ran aground in the River Clyde near Greenock whilst being towed from Govan to Greenock. Her completion was delayed by a drydock accident at Greenock while fitting out, which damaged her masts. She steamed to Spithead in November 1861 with only jury-rigged fore and mizzenmasts. The ship was commissioned in June 1862, but was not completed until 12 September 1862. Black Prince was assigned to the Channel Fleet until 1866, then spent a year as flagship on the Irish coast. Overhauled and rearmed in 1867–1868, she became guardship on the Clyde. The routine of that duty was interrupted in 1869 when she and Warrior towed a large floating drydock from Madeira to Bermuda.

Black Prince was again refitted in 1874–1875, gaining a poop deck, and rejoined the Channel Fleet as flagship of Rear Admiral Sir John Dalrymple-Hay, second-in-command of the fleet. In 1878 Captain Prince Alfred, Duke of Edinburgh took command and the ship crossed the Atlantic to participate in the installation of a new Governor General of Canada. Upon her return Black Prince was placed in reserve at Devonport, and, reclassified as an armoured cruiser, she was reactivated periodically to take part in annual fleet exercises. Black Prince was hulked in 1896 as a harbour training ship, stationed at Queenstown, and was renamed Emerald in 1903. In 1910 the ship was moved to Plymouth and renamed Impregnable III when she was assigned to the training school HMS Impregnable before she was sold for scrap on 21 February 1923.
