= Zamba Zembola =

US enslaved person and author

- The Life and Adventures of Zamba, 1847. The text under the portrait reads "African negro slave".
- Born: c. 1780; Unknown
- Died: Before 1860 (aged 60–70) or Before 1870 (aged 70–80) or Unknown
- Known for: author of the novel The Life and Adventures of Zamba, an African Negro King.

Zamba Zembola (born c. 1780) is the supposed author of an 1847 slave narrative, The Life and Adventures of Zamba, an African Negro King; and his Experience of Slavery in South Carolina, which describes his kidnapping and 40 years of labor as a enslaved person on a plantation in the U.S. state of South Carolina. The work was edited by Peter Neilson, a Scottish abolitionist. Some scholars believe the book is not a genuine slave narrative but is fiction written by Neilson. Neilson refused to produce Zamba for inspection by anyone else.

== Debate on authenticity of The Life and Adventures of Zamba ==
On its appearance in 1847, The Spectator took a skeptical view of all the detail in the book; the New Monthly Magazine, however, called it "a genuine and interesting sketch of African domestic manners". A review in the Baptist Magazine raised the question of its authenticity.

Some modern scholarly sources state outright that Neilson was the author of the work, not without cautioning that Harriet Jacobs' Incidents in the Life of a Slave Girl, once thought to be fiction written by its American editor Lydia Maria Child, is now accepted as authentic. Graham White wrote of the time gap between the 1820s, when, on Neilson's account, he knew Zamba in the US, and 1847, when the work was published, as raising issues that do not have immediate answers. Robert S. Starobin stated that the work "provides an extreme example of the problem of antislavery romanticism in a slave narrative", also citing Philip D. Curtin's opinion that it was a "blatant forgery".

== Account of early life and slavery ==
According to the book, Zamba was born in the Congo. He was in his twenties when he befriended Captain Winton, one of the Western slave traders with whom his father, the king, did business. Winton provided Zamba with an education and, eventually, passage on his slave ship to America. A free man, Zamba recorded the squalid conditions in which the enslaved people were kept. Upon his arrival to the United States, the Captain sold him into slavery and confiscated his possessions. Forced to work for over 40 years on a plantation in South Carolina, he published his autobiography The Life and Adventures of Zamba, an African King in 1847, after obtaining his freedom.

Title page from The Life and Adventures of Zamba.
