= Peter Nielsen =

Peter Nielsen may refer to:

== Sports ==
- Peter Nielsen (footballer) (born 1968), Danish footballer
- Peter Nielsen (sport shooter) (1890–1972), Danish Olympic shooter; see Shooting at the 1912 Summer Olympics – Men's 50 metre pistol
- Peter Heine Nielsen (born 1973), Danish chess grandmaster
- Peter Meinert Nielsen (born 1966), Danish road bicycle racer

== Others ==
- Peter Nielsen (actor) (1876–1949), Danish film actor
- Peter Nielsen (botanist) (1829–1897), Danish botanist, mycologist and plant pathologist
- Peter E. Nielsen, Danish biochemist and inventor of Peptide nucleic acid
- Peter Alsing Nielsen (1907–1985), Danish painter
- Peter Nielsen (air traffic controller) (died 2004), Danish-born Swiss air traffic controller at the time of the 2002 Überlingen mid-air collision
- Peter Nielsen, contestant on series four of the Irish TV series The Apprentice

== See also ==
- Peter Neilson (disambiguation)
- Pete Nielsen (1938–2019), American politician
