= Peter Neilson (poet) =

Scottish businessman, poet and author (1795–1861)

- Born: 24 September 1795; Glasgow
- Died: May 3, 1861 (aged 65); Kirkintilloch
- Occupations: businessman poet author
- Notable work: Six Years' Residence in America (1828); The Millennium and Scripture Gems (1834); The Life and Adventures of Zamba, an African King; and his Experiences of Slavery in South Carolina (1846)

Peter Neilson (1795–1861) was a Scottish author, businessman, and poet. He also proposed some naval inventions.

== Life ==
The youngest son of George Neilson, a calenderer, he was born in Glasgow on 24 September 1795. Educated at Glasgow High School and Glasgow University, he received business training at offices in the city, and then joined his father in exporting cambric and cotton goods to America. In 1820, on returning from a visit to the United States, he married his cousin, Elizabeth Robertson.

From 1822 to 1828 Neilson was in America on business. His wife died about the time of his return to Scotland. In 1841 he settled in Kirkintilloch, Dunbartonshire, where an unmarried sister managed for him and his family of three daughters and one son.

In his latter years Neilson suffered from heart disease, and he died at Kirkintilloch on 3 May 1861, and was interred in the burying-ground of Glasgow Cathedral.

== Works ==
On his return to Scotland, Neilson published Six Years' Residence in America, 1828. It includes his visits to New York City in the 1822 outbreak of yellow fever, and to Harlem, and details, now considered exaggerated, of the Lavinia Fisher murders in Charleston, where he claimed to have been in 1820. He visited also Philadelphia, and New Orleans where he attended religious services.

Neilson wrote poetry, and The Millennium and Scripture Gems were published in 1834. His collected Poems, edited with memoir by Dr. William Whitelaw, appeared in 1870.

Neilson edited, or wrote, The Life and Adventures of Zamba, an African King; and his Experiences of Slavery in South Carolina (1846). Ostensibly this was a slave narrative by Zamba Zembola only edited by Neilson. He also contributed to the Glasgow Herald a series of articles on Cotton Supply for Britain.

== Inventor ==
In 1846 Neilson proposed improvements on the life-buoy to the Admiralty. On 8 January 1848 he wrote to Lord John Russell, suggesting iron-plated ships, and 1855 he corresponded further on the subject with Lord Panmure and Admiral Earl Hardwicke. After the building of HMS Warrior and HMS Black Prince, Neilson summed up his views in Remarks on Iron-built Ships of War and Iron-plated Ships of War, 1861. Shortly afterwards he published another pamphlet, on the defence of unfortified cities such as London.

== Notes ==
Attribution

This article incorporates text from a publication now in the public domain: Lee, Sidney, ed. (1894). "Neilson, Peter". Dictionary of National Biography. Vol. 40. London: Smith, Elder & Co.
