= Defence-class ironclad =

British warship class

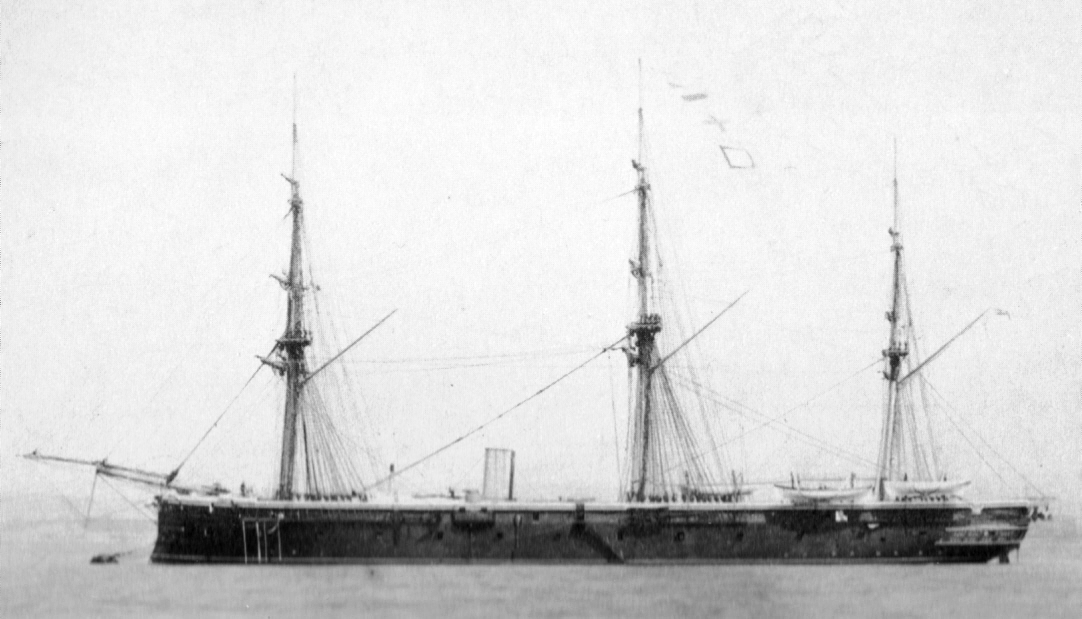
- Defence as she appeared after 1866

Class overview
- Name: Defense-class ironclad
- Builders: Palmers, Jarrow; Westwood, Baillie, Cubitt Town
- Operators: Royal Navy
- Preceded by: Warrior class
- Succeeded by: Hector class
- Built: 1859–1862
- In service: 1861–1935
- In commission: 1861–1885
- Completed: 2
- Scrapped: 2

General characteristics
- Type: Armoured frigate
- Displacement: 6,070–6,150 long tons (6,170–6,250 t)
- Length: 302 ft (92.0 m) o/a; 280 ft (85 m) p/p
- Beam: 54 ft 2 in (16.5 m)
- Draught: 24 ft 6 in (7.5 m) forward; 26 ft (7.9 m) aft
- Installed power: 4 boilers; 2,540 ihp (1,890 kW)
- Propulsion: 1 shaft; 1 trunk steam engine
- Sail plan: Barque rigged
- Speed: 11 knots (20 km/h; 13 mph)
- Range: 1,670 nmi (3,090 km; 1,920 mi) at 10 knots (19 km/h; 12 mph)
- Complement: 460
- Armament: 6–8 × 7 in (178 mm) rifled breech-loading (RBL) guns; 10 × 68-pdr smoothbore muzzle-loaders; 2 × 32-pounder smoothbore guns or 4 × 5 in (127 mm) RBLs
- Armour: Belt: 4.5 in (114 mm); Bulkheads: 4.5 in (114 mm)

The Defence-class ironclads were a class of two warships built for the Royal Navy between 1859 and 1862. The ships were designed as armoured frigates (Note: Ironclad is the all-encompassing term for armoured warships of this period. Armoured frigates were basically designed for the same role as traditional wooden frigates, but this later changed as the size and expense of these ships forced them to be used in the line of battle.) in response to an invasion scare sparked by the launch of the French ironclad Gloire and her three sisters in 1858. They were initially armed with a mix of rifled breech-loading and muzzle-loading smoothbore guns, but the Armstrong breech-loading guns proved unreliable and were withdrawn from service after a few years.

Both ships were initially assigned to the Channel Squadron, but Resistance was transferred to the Mediterranean Squadron in 1864. The ships were rearmed in the late 1860s after the completion of their first commission. They alternated between assignments with the fleet and guardship duties with the First Reserve for the rest of their careers. Resistance was the first to be paid off in 1880 and was used as a target for gunnery and torpedo trials beginning in 1885. She was sold for ship breaking in 1898, but wrecked en route to the breaker's yard. Defence was paid off in 1885 and she became a stationary training ship in 1890 until she was sold for scrap in 1935.

== Background ==
In 1859 the Admiralty was not yet convinced that the very expensive (£377,000) Warrior-class ironclads, which cost more than twice the wooden, steam-powered ships of the line, had to be accepted as the norm. They noted that the 4.5-inch (114 mm) armour plate of the Warriors was adequate to deflect all ordnance currently afloat, and high speed was not necessary to prevent existing wooden ships from massing their fire against the ironclads. Their Lordships therefore requested a design which, while carrying the same armour, was smaller and slower, and thus cheaper, than the Warriors. Rear Admiral Sir Baldwin Wake Walker, Controller of the Navy, proposed that six ships be built to this design, but he was over-ruled and only two were ordered on 14 December 1859.

The Admiralty's decision saddled the Royal Navy with a pair of ships that could not operate with the Warriors in a tactical squadron and were inferior to the French ironclads then under construction. The naval architect Sir Nathaniel Barnaby, a future Constructor of the Navy, considered that a Defence-class ship was worth one quarter of a Warrior in terms of combat, although they cost about two-thirds as much.

== Description ==
The Defence class was 280 feet (85.3 m) long between perpendiculars and 291 feet 4 inches (88.8 m) long overall. They had a beam of 54 feet 2 inches (16.5 m) and a draught of 26 feet 2 inches (8.0 m). The ships displaced 6,070 long tons (6,170 t) and had a tonnage of 3,710 tons burthen. Unlike their predecessors, they were fitted with a ram in the shape of a plough. The ends of the hull were subdivided by watertight transverse bulkheads and had a partial double bottom. Each ship had a complement of 460 officers and ratings. The Defence class was 128 feet 8 inches (39.2 m) shorter overall and displaced more than 3,000 long tons (3,000 t) less than the Warrior-class ironclads.

=== Propulsion ===
The Defence-class ships had a single two-cylinder trunk steam engine made by John Penn and Sons driving a single 21-foot (6.4 m) propeller. Four rectangular boilers provided steam to the engine at a working pressure of 20 psi (138 kPa; 1 kgf/cm^{2}). The engines produced 2,329–2,343 indicated horsepower (1,737–1,747 kW) during sea trials which gave the ships maximum speeds of 11.23–11.4 knots (20.80–21.11 km/h; 12.92–13.12 mph). They carried 450 long tons (460 t) of coal, enough to steam 1,670 nautical miles (3,090 km; 1,920 mi) at 10 knots (19 km/h; 12 mph).

The ironclads were barque-rigged and had a sail area of 24,500 square feet (2,276 m^{2}). The lower masts and bowsprit were made of iron to withstand the shock of ramming. Both ships could make about 10.5 knots (19.4 km/h; 12.1 mph) under sail alone. To reduce wind resistance while under sail alone, the funnel was semi-retractable. Similarly, the propeller could be hoisted up into the stern of the ship to reduce drag while under sail.

=== Armament ===
The armament of the Defence-class ships was intended to be 18 smoothbore, muzzle-loading 68-pounder guns, eight on each side on the main deck and one each fore and aft as chase guns on the upper deck, plus four Armstrong 40-pounder guns, an early rifled breech loader (RBL) design, as saluting guns. The 8.12-inch (206 mm) 68-pounder weighed 10,640 pounds (4,826 kg) and had a range of 3,200 yards (2,900 m) with solid shot. During construction the armament was changed to six (Defence) or eight (Resistance) of the new Armstrong rifled 7" breech-loading 110-pounder guns, ten 68-pounders, and either two 32-pounder smoothbores (Resistance) or four breech-loading 5-inch (127 mm) guns (Defence). (Note: No such gun ever entered RN service during this time; these may have been experimental 70-pounder Armstrong guns developed in parallel with the 40- and 110-pounder guns or the 40-pounder gun called by its calibre, rounding upwards.) The innovative 9,520-pound (4,318 kg) 110-pounder, whose 7-inch (178 mm) shell could reach 4,000 yards (3,700 m) was in short supply when the ironclads were launched, and poor results in armour-penetration tests halted plans to fully equip the ironclads with this gun. Furthermore, the 110-pounders proved problematic in service. They were labour-intensive to load and fire, and some of them blew up when other ships used them in action. After that, they were only used with a reduced propellant charge, which left them useless in practice.

Both ships were rearmed in the late 1860s with 14 seven-inch and two eight-inch rifled muzzle-loading guns. The new guns were heavier so fewer could be carried. On both ships the eight-inch guns were mounted amidships on the main deck on the broadside and a pair of seven-inch guns were mounted on the upper deck as fore and aft chase guns. Eight of the remaining seven-inch guns were also placed on the main deck on the broadside where they were protected by the ship's armour, but one pair was on the main deck further aft where they were not protected by armour. The two ships differed where the last pair of seven-inch guns was positioned: Defence mounted them on the main deck, forward of the armour, while Resistance mounted hers on the upper deck.

The shell of the eight-inch (203 mm) weighed 175 pounds (79.4 kg) while the gun itself weighed 9 long tons (9.1 t). It had a muzzle velocity of 1,410 ft/s (430 m/s) and was credited with the ability to penetrate 9.6 inches (244 mm) of wrought iron armour at the muzzle. The 6.5-long-ton (6.6 t) seven-inch gun fired a 112 pounds (50.8 kg) shell and could penetrate 7.7-inch (196 mm) armour. All of the guns could fire both solid shot and explosive shells.

=== Armour ===
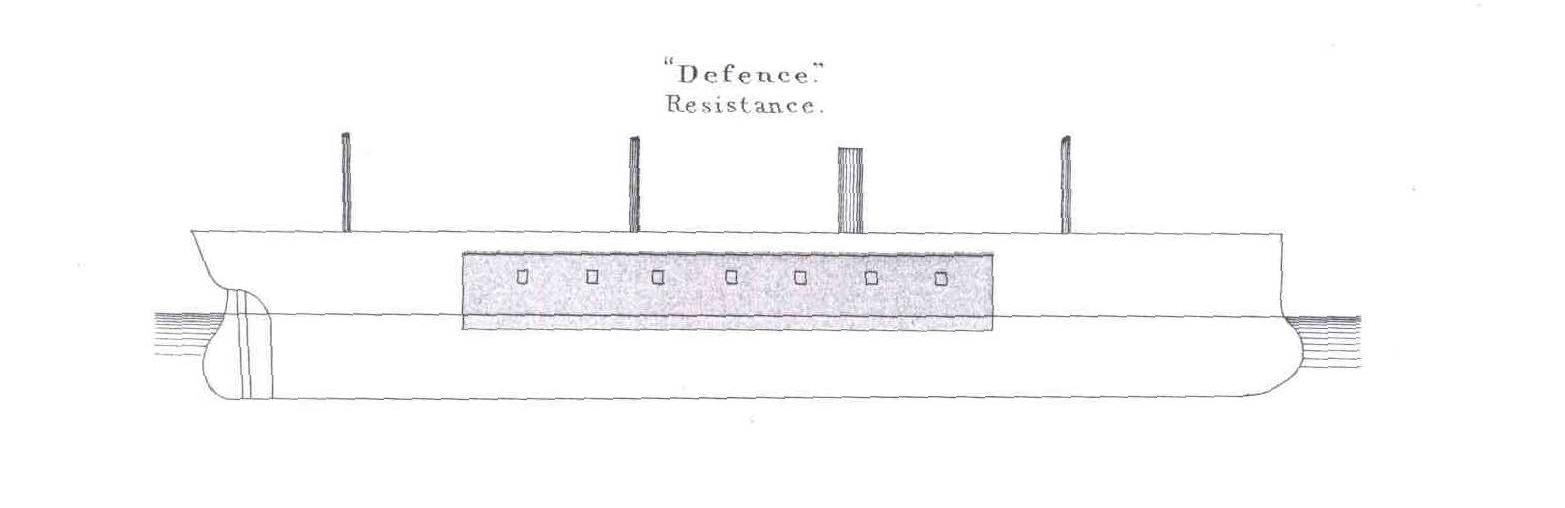
Right elevation of Defence from Brassey's Naval Annual 1888; the shaded area shows the ship's armour

The Defence-class ships had a wrought iron armour belt, 4.5 inches (114 mm) thick, that covered 140 feet (42.7 m) amidships. The armour extended from upper deck level to six feet (1.8 m) below the waterline. Transverse bulkheads 4.5 inches thick protected the guns on the main deck from raking fire. The armour was backed by 18 inches (460 mm) of teak. The ends of the ship were left entirely unprotected which meant that the steering gear was very vulnerable. They were, however, sub-divided into many watertight compartments to minimize any flooding.

== Ships ==
Construction data
Ship	Builder	Laid down	Launched	Commissioned	Fate	Cost
Defence	Palmers, Jarrow	14 December 1859	24 April 1861	4 December 1861	Scrapped, 1935	£252,422
Resistance	Westwood, Baillie, Cubitt Town, London	21 December 1859	11 April 1861	2 July 1862	Sold for scrap, 1898, foundered under tow, 4 March 1899, later raised and broken up	£258,120

== Service ==
HMS Defence was assigned to the Channel Squadron upon completion in 1862. The ship was paid off in 1866 to refit and be re-armed and was briefly reassigned to the Channel Squadron again when she recommissioned in 1868. Defence had brief tours on the North American and Mediterranean Stations, from 1869 to 1872, then refitted again from 1872 to 1874. She became guard ship on the Shannon when she recommissioned. The ship was assigned to the Channel Squadron a third time in 1876, and in 1879 became guard ship on the Mersey until 1885. Defence was then placed in reserve. In 1890, she was assigned to the mechanical training school at Devonport. She was renamed Indus when the school adopted that name and served there until sold in 1935.

HMS Resistance was the first capital ship in the Royal Navy to be fitted with a ram and was given the nickname of Old Rammo. She was initially assigned to the Channel Squadron, but was transferred to the Mediterranean Station in 1864, the first ironclad to be assigned to that squadron. Resistance was rearmed in 1867 and became a guardship when recommissioned in 1869. The ship was reassigned to the Channel Squadron in 1873 before reverting to her former duties in 1877. Resistance was decommissioned in 1880 and was used for gunnery and torpedo trials beginning in 1885. The ship was sold for scrap in 1898 and foundered the following year en route to the breaker's yard. Her wreck was later salvaged and scrapped.
