= Warrior-class ironclad =

Class of ironclads of the Royal Navy

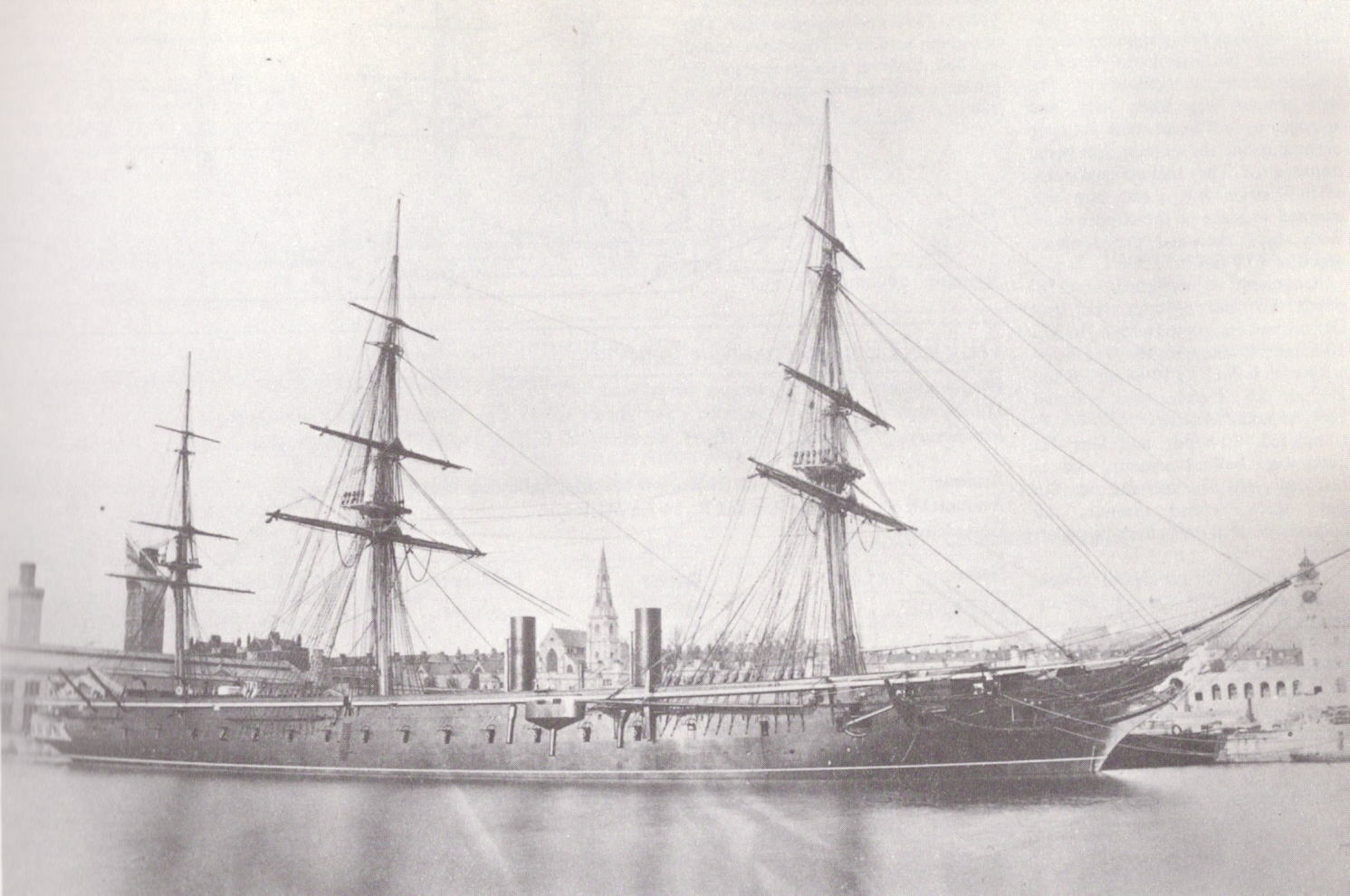
- Warrior in the 1860s

Class overview
- Name: Warrior-class ironclad
- Builders: Robert Napier and Sons; Thames Ironworks
- Operators: Royal Navy
- Preceded by: None
- Succeeded by: Defence class
- Built: 1859–1862
- In service: 1861–1979
- In commission: 1861–1902
- Completed: 2
- Scrapped: 1
- Preserved: 1

General characteristics (Warrior as built)
- Type: Armoured frigate
- Displacement: 9,137 long tons (9,284 t)
- Length: 420 ft (128.0 m)
- Beam: 58 ft 4 in (17.8 m)
- Draught: 26 ft 10 in (8.2 m)
- Installed power: 5,267 ihp (3,928 kW)
- Propulsion: 1 shaft, 1 Trunk steam engine
- Sail plan: Ship rig
- Speed: 14 knots (26 km/h; 16 mph)
- Range: 2,100 nmi (3,900 km; 2,400 mi) at 11 knots (20 km/h; 13 mph)
- Complement: 707
- Armament: 26 × Smoothbore muzzle-loading 68-pounder guns; 10 × Rifled breechloading 110-pounder guns; 4 × Rifled breechloading 40-pounder guns
- Armour: Belt: 4.5 in (114 mm); Bulkheads: 4.5 in (114 mm)

The Warrior-class ironclads were a class of two warships built for the Royal Navy between 1859 and 1862, the first ocean-going ironclads with iron hulls ever constructed. The ships were designed as armoured frigates in response to an invasion scare sparked by the launch of the French ironclad Gloire and her three sisters in 1858. They were initially armed with a mix of rifled breech-loading and muzzle-loading smoothbore guns, but the Armstrong breech-loading guns proved unreliable and were ultimately withdrawn from service.

The ships spent their first commission with the Channel Fleet before being rearmed with new rifled muzzle-loading guns in the late 1860s. Warrior rejoined the Channel Fleet after her refit while Black Prince joined the 1st Class Reserve and joined the fleet during its annual manoeuvres. The two ships exchanged roles after another refit in the mid-1870s. Both ships spent most of the last two decades of the 19th century in reserve. Warrior was hulked in 1902 and survived to be restored in 1979 as a museum ship. Black Prince became a training ship in 1896 and was hulked in 1910 before being sold for scrap in 1923.

== Design and description ==
The Warrior-class ships have been described as revolutionary, but in truth they were more evolutionary than not as everything except their wrought iron armour had been in use by ocean-going ships for years. The naval architect and historian David K. Brown commented, "What made [Warrior] truly novel was the way in which these individual aspects were blended together, making her the biggest and most powerful warship in the world." They were designed in response to Gloire, which started an invasion scare in Britain, but they had a very different concept of operation to the French ship which was meant as a replacement for wooden ships of the line. They were designed by Chief Constructor of the Navy Isaac Watts as 40-gun armoured frigates largely based on the fine lines of the large frigate Mersey. Warrior and her sister Black Prince were not intended to stand in the line of battle as the Admiralty was uncertain about their ability to withstand concentrated fire from wooden two and three-deck ships of the line. Rather they were designed to be fast enough to force battle on a fleeing enemy and to control the range at which a battle was fought for their own advantage.

=== General characteristics ===
The Warrior-class ships were 380 feet 2 inches (115.9 m) long between perpendiculars and 420 feet (128.0 m) long overall. This was 44 feet (13.4 m) longer than the Mersey, the longest wooden-hulled ship in the Royal Navy. They had a beam of 58 feet 4 inches (17.8 m) and a draught of 26 feet 10 inches (8.2 m). The ships displaced 9,137 long tons (9,284 t). The hull was subdivided by watertight transverse bulkheads into 92 compartments and had a double bottom underneath the engine and boiler rooms.

Two bilge keels were fitted (the first used by the Royal Navy), which significantly reduced the roll of the ships. Because of their length the ships proved to be very sluggish while manoeuvring, as Warrior proved when she collided with Royal Oak in 1868. The Warrior-class ships trimmed down by the bow, not least because they were fitted with a 40-long-ton (41 t) iron knee placed at the bow to give it a traditionally pleasing shape. This also prevented the ships from ramming any other ships. The bowsprit was shortened after completion in an effort to reduce the trim, but it was not noticeably successful.

=== Propulsion ===
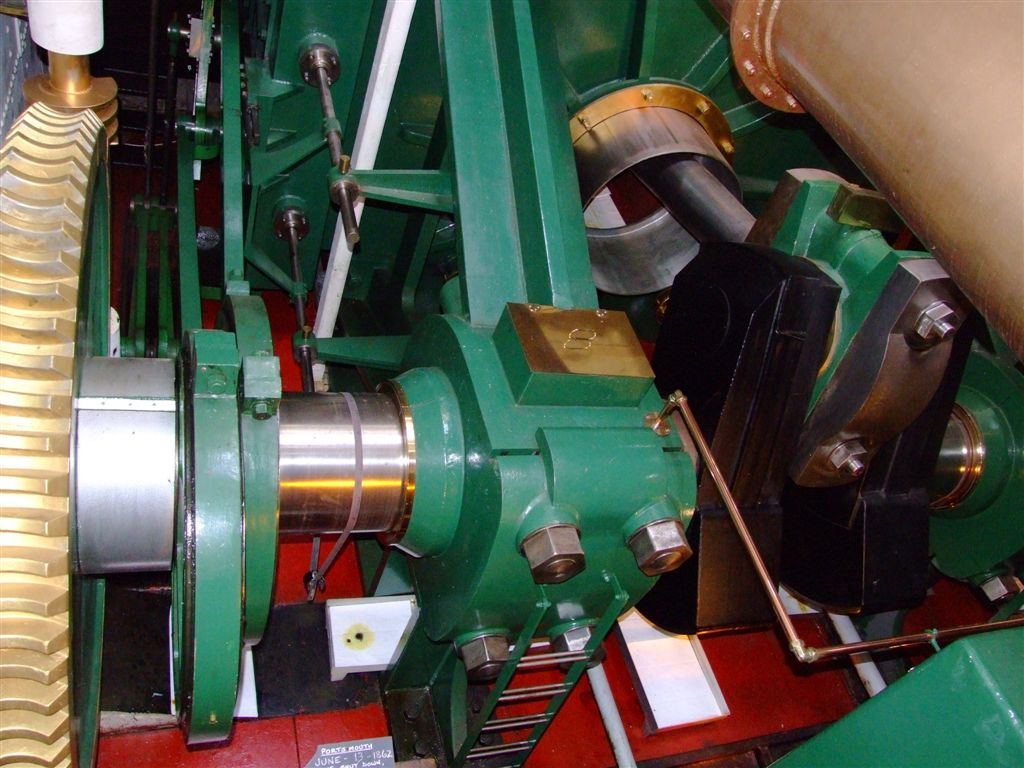
Close-up of the ship's trunk steam engine

The Warrior-class ships had one 2-cylinder trunk steam engine made by John Penn and Sons driving a single 24-foot-6-inch (7.5 m) propeller. Ten rectangular boilers provided steam to the engine at a working pressure of 20 psi (138 kPa; 1 kgf/cm^{2}). The engine produced a total of 5,267 indicated horsepower (3,928 kW) and was the most powerful thus far built for a warship. On sea trials in October 1861 Warrior had a maximum speed around 14.3 knots (26.5 km/h; 16.5 mph); Black Prince was about a half knot slower. The ships carried 800 long tons (810 t) of coal, enough to steam 2,100 nautical miles (3,900 km; 2,400 mi) at 11 knots (20 km/h; 13 mph).

The ironclads were ship rigged and had a sail area of 48,400 square feet (4,497 m^{2}). The lower masts were made of wood, but the other masts were iron. Warrior made 13 knots (24 km/h; 15 mph) under sail, but Black Prince could only do 11 knots (20 km/h; 13 mph). Under both sail and steam Warrior once logged 17.5 knots (32.4 km/h; 20.1 mph). Both funnels were semi-retractable to reduce wind resistance while under sail alone. The ships' propellers could be hoisted up into the stern of the ship to reduce drag while under sail. They were the largest hoistable propellers ever made and required about 600 men to be raised.

=== Armament ===
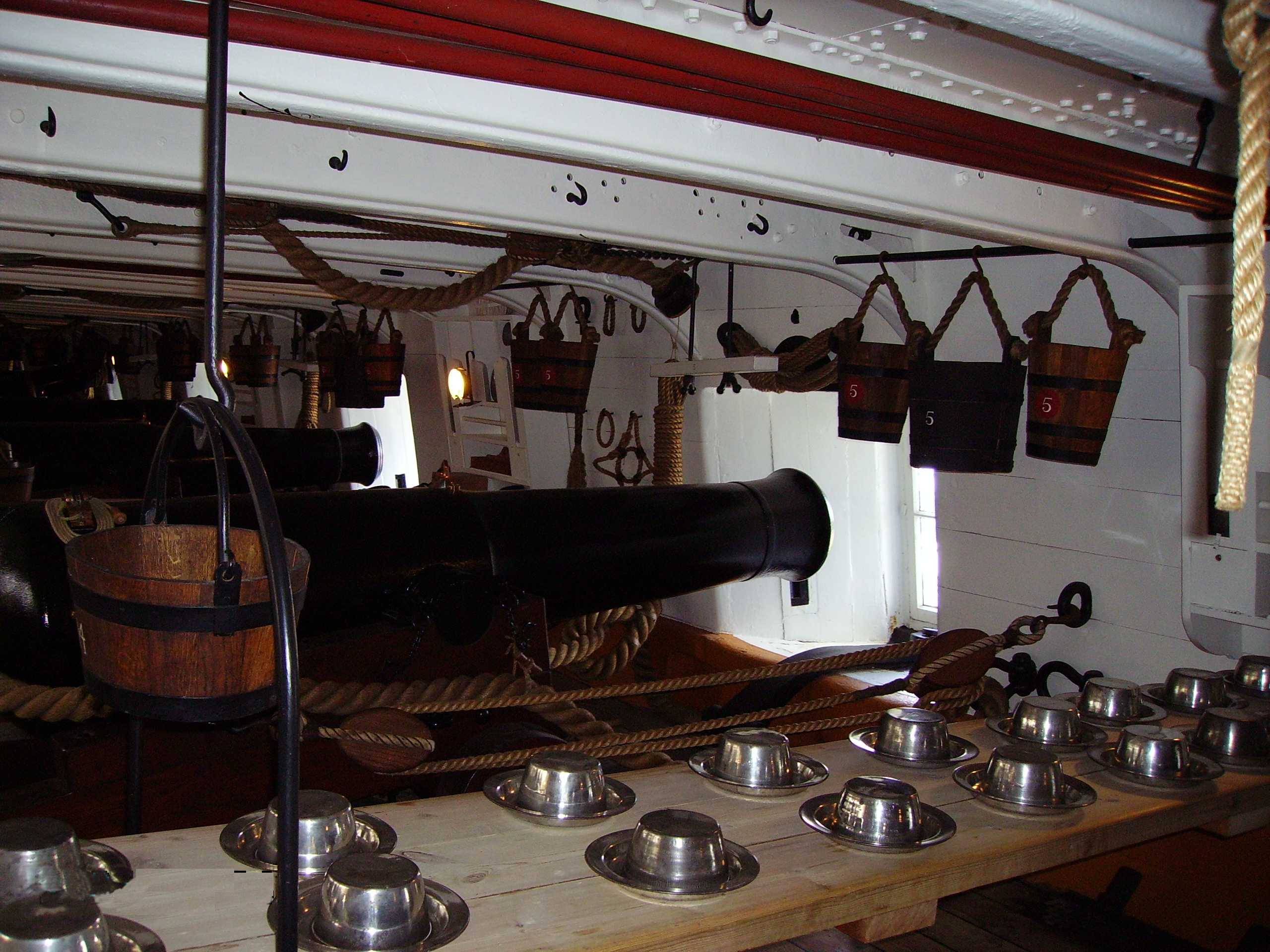
A mess table aboard Warrior with a 68-pounder cannon in the background

The armament of the Warrior-class ships was intended to be 40 smoothbore, muzzle-loading 68-pounder guns, 19 on each side on the main deck and one each fore and aft as chase guns on the upper deck. This was modified during construction to ten rifled 110-pounder breech-loading guns, twenty-six 68-pounders, and four rifled breech-loading 40-pounder guns as saluting guns. The 40-pounder guns were to have been replaced by 70-pounder guns, but these failed their tests and were never issued. Both breech-loading guns were new designs from Armstrong and much was hoped for them. Four of the 110-pounder guns were installed on the main deck amidships and the other two became chase guns; all of the 68-pounder guns were mounted on the main deck. Firing tests carried out in September 1861 against an armoured target, however, proved that the 110-pounder was inferior to the 68-pounder smoothbore gun in armour penetration and repeated incidents of breech explosions during the Battles for Shimonoseki and the Bombardment of Kagoshima in 1863–1864 forestalled plans to completely equip the ships with the 110-pounder gun.

The 7.9-inch (201 mm) solid shot of the 68-pounder gun weighed approximately 68 pounds (30.8 kg) while the gun itself weighed 10,640 pounds (4,826.2 kg). The gun had a muzzle velocity of 1,579 ft/s (481 m/s) and had a range of 3,200 yards (2,900 m) at an elevation of 12°. The 7-inch (178 mm) shell of the 110-pounder Armstrong breech-loader weighed 107–110 pounds (48.5–49.9 kg). It had a muzzle velocity of 1,150 ft/s (350 m/s) and, at an elevation of 11.25°, a maximum range of 4,000 yards (3,700 m). The shell of the 40-pounder breech-loading gun was 4.75 inches (121 mm) in diameter and weighed 40 pounds (18.1 kg). The gun had a maximum range of 3,800 yards (3,500 m) at a muzzle velocity of 1,150 ft/s (350 m/s). The 110-pounder gun weighed 9,520 pounds (4,318.2 kg) while the 40-pounder weighed 3,584 pounds (1,625.7 kg). In 1863–1864 the 40-pounder guns were replaced by a heavier version with the same ballistics. All of the guns could fire both solid shot and explosive shells.

Both ships were rearmed during their 1867–1868 refit with a mix of 7- and 8-inch (203 mm) rifled muzzle-loading guns. Warrior received twenty-eight 7-inch and four 8-inch guns while Black Prince received four fewer 7-inch guns. Both ships received four 20-pounder breech-loading guns for use as saluting guns. The shell of the 15-calibre 8-inch gun weighed 175 pounds (79.4 kg) while the gun itself weighed 9 long tons (9.1 t). It had a muzzle velocity of 1,410 ft/s (430 m/s) and was credited with the ability to penetrate a nominal 9.6 inches (244 mm) of wrought iron armour at the muzzle. The 16-calibre 7-inch gun weighed 6.5 long tons (6.6 t) and fired a 112-pound (50.8 kg) shell. It was credited with the nominal ability to penetrate 7.7-inch (196 mm) armour.

=== Armour ===
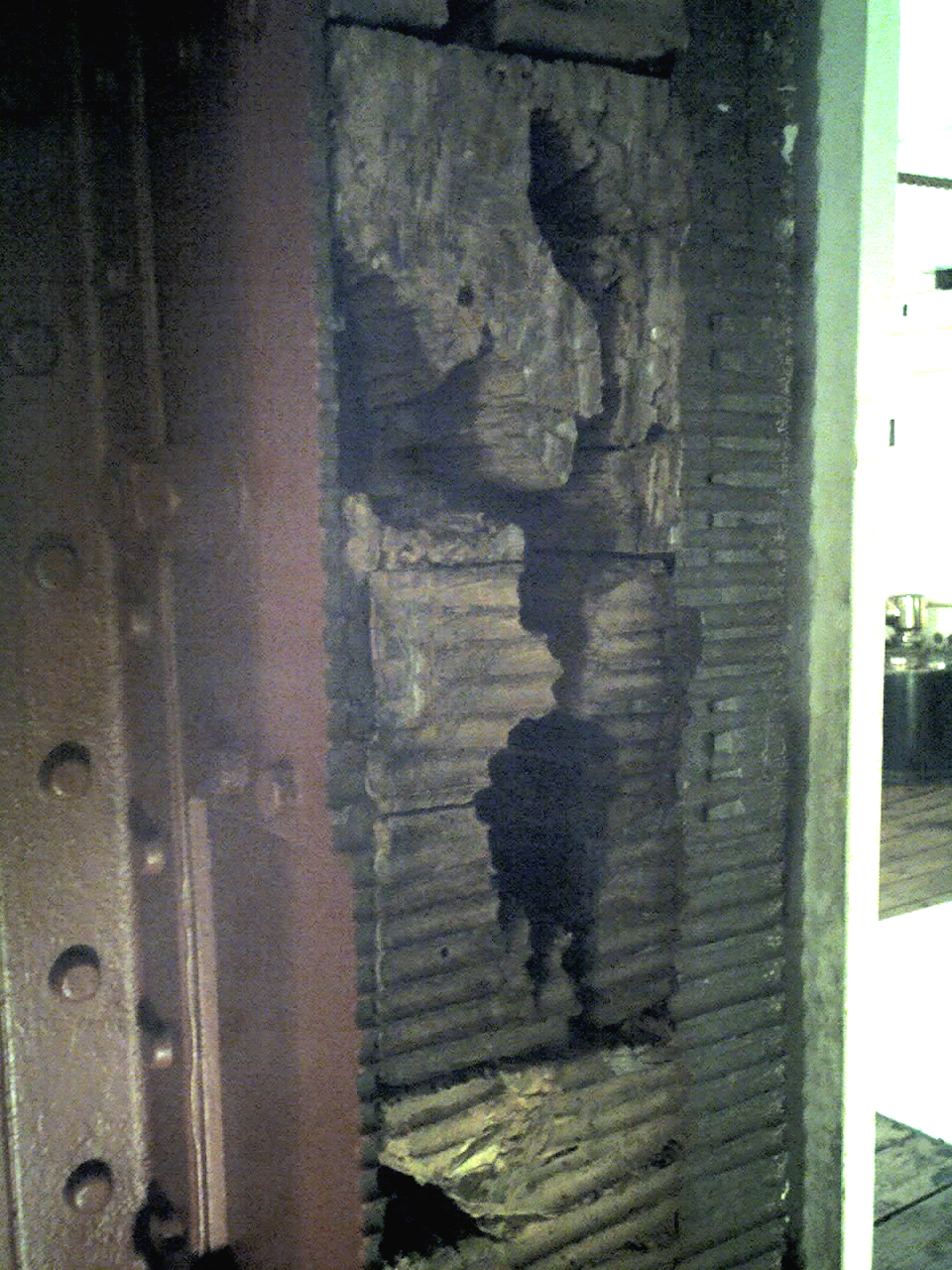
Cross-section of Warrior's armour

The Warrior-class ships had a wrought-iron armour belt, 4.5 inches (114 mm) thick, that covered 213 feet (64.9 m) amidships. The armour extended 16 feet (4.9 m) above the waterline and 6 feet (1.8 m) below it. 4.5-inch transverse bulkheads protected the guns on the main deck. The armour was backed by 16 inches (410 mm) of teak. The ends of the ship were left entirely unprotected which meant that the steering gear was very vulnerable.

== Construction ==
The gun ports of the Warrior-class ships were built 46 inches (1.2 m) wide, which allowed the 68-pounders to traverse 52°. While the ships were being built the directing bar was developed which consisted of an iron bar that fastened to a pivot bolt in the sill of the gun port. After the gun carriages were modified, this allowed them to pivot much closer to the gun port than had previously been possible and meant that the gun ports could be narrowed to a width of 24 inches (0.6 m) while retaining the same arc of fire. The gun ports were narrowed to the new width by 7 inches (178 mm) of wrought iron. Another delay was the modification of the armour plates with tongue and groove joints to lock the plates together and increase their resistance to armour-piercing shells. All together these modifications delayed the completion of Warrior by a year past her contract completion date.

Construction data
Ship	Builder	Laid down	Launched	Completed	Fate	Cost
HMS Warrior	Thames Ironworks, Blackwall, London	25 May 1859	29 December 1860	24 October 1861	Museum ship 1979	£377,292
HMS Black Prince (ex-Invincible)	Robert Napier, Govan, Glasgow	12 October 1859	27 February 1861	12 September 1862	Sold for scrap, 21 February 1923	£377,954

== Service ==
HMS Warrior joined the Channel Fleet in July 1862 and was placed in ordinary from 1864 to 1867, during which time she was refitted. The ship rejoined the Channel Fleet in 1867 and towed a floating drydock to Bermuda in 1869 with her sister Black Prince. Warrior was placed in ordinary again from 1872 to 1875 and was modified with a poop deck. She was recommissioned into the 1st Class Reserve in 1875 and made periodic training cruises until 1883. The ship was formally reclassified as an armoured frigate in 1884, but was disarmed and mastless. Warrior was hulked as a depot ship in Portsmouth Harbor in 1902 and renamed Vernon III in 1904 when she became part of HMS Vernon, the Royal Navy's Torpedo School. The ship regained her original name in 1923 and was converted once more into an oil pipeline pier in 1927. Warrior was towed to Pembroke Dock in 1929 and was renamed C77 in 1942 to release her name for the new aircraft carrier HMS Warrior. In 1979 C77 was moved to Hartlepool and was restored as HMS Warrior (1860) as the Fleet Headquarters in Northwood, London had assumed the name of HMS Warrior in the early 1960s. The ironclad can now be seen near HMS Victory at Portsmouth Historic Dockyard.

Black Prince capsized while in dock at Greenock, damaging her masts. She arrived in Spithead in November 1861 with only jury-rigged fore and mizzenmasts. The ship was assigned to the Channel Fleet upon her completion and in 1867–68 she was rearmed and then assigned to the 1st Class Reserve. She was refitted in 1874 and given a poop deck, and rejoined the Channel Fleet in 1875 as the flagship of Rear Admiral Sir John Dalrymple-Hay, second in command of the fleet. Black Prince was placed in reserve in 1878 in Devonport until she was converted to a training ship in 1896 in Queenstown, Ireland and renamed Emerald in 1903. The ship was hulked and renamed Impregnable III in 1910 when she was assigned to the training school HMS Impregnable before she was sold for scrap on 21 March 1923.

== Bibliography ==
- Ballard, G. A. (1980). The Black Battlefleet. Naval Institute Press. ISBN 0-87021-924-3.
- Brown, David K. (1997). Warrior to Dreadnought: Warship Development 1860–1905. Chatham Publishing. ISBN 1-86176-022-1.
- Jones, Colin (1996). "Entente Cordiale, 1865". In McLean, David & Preston, Antony (eds.). Warship 1996. Conway Maritime Press. ISBN 0-85177-685-X.
- Lambert, Andrew (1987). Warrior: Restoring the World's First Ironclad. Conway. ISBN 0-85177-411-3.
- Parkes, Oscar (1990) [1966]. British Battleships, Warrior 1860 to Vanguard 1950: A History of Design, Construction, and Armament (New & rev. ed.). Naval Institute Press. ISBN 1-55750-075-4.
- Roberts, John (1979). "Great Britain and Empire Forces". In Chesneau, Roger & Kolesnik, Eugene M. (eds.). Conway's All the World's Fighting Ships 1860-1905. Conway Maritime Press. ISBN 0-8317-0302-4.
- Silverstone, Paul H. (1984). Directory of the World's Capital Ships. Hippocrene Books. ISBN 0-88254-979-0.
- Text Book of Gunnery. Harrison and Sons for His Majesty's Stationery Office. 1887. Archived from the original on 4 December 2012.
