= RML 8-inch 9-ton gun =

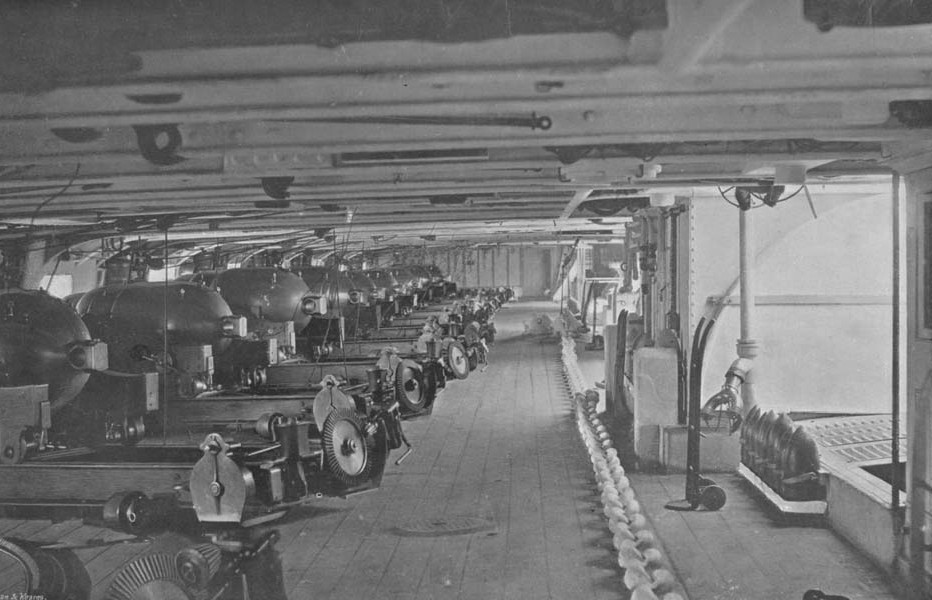
- Gundeck of HMS Northumberland
- Type: Naval gun Coast defence gun
- Place of origin: United Kingdom

Service history
- In service: 1866–190?
- Used by: Royal Navy

Production history
- Manufacturer: Royal Arsenal
- Unit cost: £568
- Variants: Mk I – Mk III

Specifications
- Mass: 9 long tons (9.1 t)
- Barrel length: 118 inches (3.0 m) bore + chamber
- Shell: 174 pounds 12 ounces (79.3 kg)
- Calibre: 8-inch (203.2 mm)
- Muzzle velocity: 1,420 feet per second (430 m/s)

The British RML 8-inch 9-ton guns Mark I – Mark III were medium rifled muzzle-loading guns used to arm smaller ironclad warships and coast defence batteries in the later 19th century.

== Design ==
In common with other Royal Ordnance RML designs of the 1860s, Mark I used the strong but expensive Armstrong system of a steel tube surrounded by a complex system of multiple wrought-iron coils, which was progressively simplified in Marks II and III to reduce costs : Mark III consisted only of A tube, B tube, breech coil and cascabel screw.

Rifling was of the "Woolwich" pattern of a small number of broad shallow grooves: 4 grooves with twist increasing from 0 to 1 turn in 40 calibres (i.e. in 320 in (810 cm)) at the muzzle.

== Ammunition ==
The ammunition was mainly studded, with the studs engaging in the Woolwich rifling grooves. However, a studless pointed common shell with automatic gas-check also became available later in the gun's life.

== See also ==
- List of naval guns

== Bibliography ==
- Text Book of Gunnery, 1887. LONDON : PRINTED FOR HIS MAJESTY'S STATIONERY OFFICE, BY HARRISON AND SONS, ST. MARTIN'S LANE
- Sir Thomas Brassey, The British Navy, Volume II. London: Longmans, Green and Co. 1882
