= HMS Endymion (1865) =

Frigate of the Royal Navy

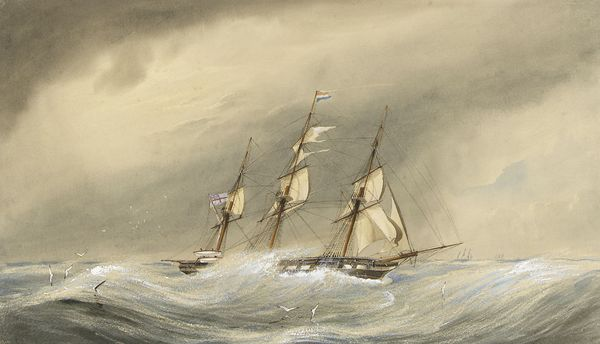
- HMS Endymion rounding the Cape of Good Hope.

History

United Kingdom
- Name: HMS Endymion
- Builder: Deptford Dockyard
- Laid down: 20 October 1860
- Launched: 18 November 1865
- Completed: September 1866
- Commissioned: 27 September 1866
- Decommissioned: 31 July 1879
- Fate: Loaned out 1881, sold in 1885

United Kingdom
- Name: Endymion
- Owner: Metropolitan Asylums Board
- Acquired: 5 July 1881 (loan); 1885 (purchase)
- In service: 1881
- Out of service: 1904
- Fate: Scrapped 1905

General characteristics
- Class & type: Frigate (1865–81); Administrative and hospital ship (1881–1904)
- Displacement: 3,197 long tons (3,248 t)
- Tons burthen: 2,478 30/94 tons BOM (design); 2,486 tons BOM (as built)
- Length: 240 ft (73.2 m)
- Beam: 47 ft 11 in (14.6 m)
- Draught: 18 ft 8 in (5.69 m)
- Installed power: 1,620 ihp (1,210 kW); 500 nominal horsepower
- Propulsion: Sails, 1 × 500 nhp steam engine, 1 shaft
- Sail plan: Full-rigged ship
- Speed: 12.5 knots (23.2 km/h; 14.4 mph)
- Complement: 450
- Armament: 4 × 100-pounder guns; 3 × 110-pounder guns; 14 × 8-inch guns

HMS Endymion was a 21-gun Ister-class wooden screw frigate, the third of four ships of this name to serve in the Royal Navy. She was the last wooden frigate built at Deptford Dockyard. She was commissioned in 1866 and spent much of her service based at Malta. In 1869–70 she sailed around the world as part of a Flying Squadron. She remained in front-line service until 1874.

Endymion then served as a guard ship at Hull, Yorkshire until 1879, latterly with her boilers condemned as unfit for service. A plan to use her as a flagship at Harwich, Essex from 1875 was abandoned due to the loss of HMS Vanguard. During her time at Hull, crew from Endymion assisted the local police in fighting a number of fires in buildings and timber yards.

Emdymion was lent to the Metropolitan Asylums Board in 1881 for use as an administration and hospital ship, initially at Greenwich, Kent and later at Dartford. She was sold out of service in 1885, and served as an administration ship until 1904. Endymion was sold in December 1904 and broken up in 1905.

== Description ==
Endymion was 240 feet (73.2 m) long, with a beam of 47 feet 11 inches (14.6 m), and a draught of 18 feet 8 inches (5.69 m). She was designed with a beam of 47 feet 10 inches (14.6 m) and a burthen of 2,478 30/94 tons BM and displaced 3,197 tons. (Note: The Illustrated London News gives a figure of 2,486 tons BM – this is the actual tons burthen as built, as she was measured as being an inch wider than her design when launched.) She was to be fitted with 36 guns and had a complement of 450. Propulsion was by a steam engine of 500 nominal horsepower, which was built by Napier & Sons, Glasgow. The engine drove a single screw propeller of 18 feet (5.49 m) diameter and 21 feet (6.40 m) pitch. The propeller was 3 feet 6 inches (1.07 m) long, and the tips of the blades were 7 feet 6 inches (2.29 m) beneath the surface of the water. She was also rigged as a full-rigged ship.

== Construction ==
Endymion was the last wooden frigate built at Deptford. Her keel was laid down on 20 October 1860. She was built on the same slip that had been vacated by the launch of HMS Newcastle. On 1 February 1862, construction of Endymion was suspended on the orders of the Admiralty, although the Admiralty later decided that she would be completed. Construction restarted on 7 February 1864. Her engines and boilers were transported from Deptford to Sheerness in October 1865 on board HMS Dee and HMS Monkey. She was launched on 18 November 1865, in front of a crowd of 10,000 people. She was then towed by the steamships Locust, Monkey and Widgeon to Woolwich, where they awaited for the tide before Endymion was towed to Sheerness for completion. Endymion was launched by Miss Ffrench, the daughter of Major Ffrench of the 74th (Highland) Regiment of Foot. A crowd of 40,000 people was present.

By January 1866, Endymion was ready to have her lower masts fitted, following which her bottom was to be coppered. She was designed to take 36 (later 30) guns, which were intended to comprise twenty-two 32-pounder smooth-bore and eight 64-pounder rifled muzzle-loading guns. However she was completed with four 100-pounder, rifled muzzle-loading guns (weight 125 Cwt/6,350 kg each), fourteen 8-inch guns (65 Cwt/3,302 kg each), located on the maindeck; and nine 110-pounder breech-loading guns (82 Cwt/6,166 kg each) located on the upper deck. In August, it was reported that Endymion was then being fitted with three 110-pounder Armstrongs guns, four 6½-ton/100-pounder and fourteen 8-inch guns.

== History ==
=== Front-line service ===
Endymion was commissioned at Sheerness on 27 September 1866, under the command of Captain Charles Wake, who had previously commanded HMS Bulldog. Sea trials were undertaken on 19 and 20 October. On the latter date, speed was assessed over a measured mile at the Maplin Sands. On the first three runs, an average speed of 12.5 knots (23.2 km/h) was recorded, but one of the bearings in the engine was found to be running hot. Three more runs were made, giving an average speed over the first six runs of 11.672 knots (21.6 km/h). Six more runs were made at half-power, giving an average of 9.788 knots (18.1 km/h).

Endymion departed from Spithead for the Mediterranean on 28 October, arriving at Gibraltar on 10 November. She sailed eastward, arriving at Valletta, Malta on 19 November. She remained at Malta until 27 December, when she departed for target practice, returning on 29 December.

Endymion departed on 2 January 1867 for Beyrout, Syria, taking supplies for HMS Racer. She had arrived at Alexandria, Egypt by 20 January. On 25 February, one of her carpenters was court-martialled on board HMS Hibernia for drunkenness. He was found guilty and dismissed from the ship, being returned to the United Kingdom on board HMS Megaera. Endymion arrived off the Syrian coast on 19 April. She returned to Malta on 29 July. On 22 August, the Mediterranean Squadron, comprising HMS Arethusa, HMS Caledonia, HMS Cruiser, HMS Endymion, HMS Prince Consort and HMS Royal Oak and under the command of Lord Clarence Paget, departed from Spezia, Italy. The squadron arrived at Bastia, Corsica from Villafranca Tirenna, Sicily on 9 September. On 9 October, HMS Cruiser was in difficulties off Avenza, Italy in a gale. Arethusa and Endymion were despatched under steam to her aid. During the rescue, one of Endymion's guns was dislodged from its mountings and ended up in a messroom. A sailor was washed overboard, but was rescued. Arethusa towed Cruiser to Spezia. On 29 October, she departed from Malta for Livorno, Italy to collect a 16-year-old Japanese prince, orders having been received to sail immediately after arrival at Malta, once refuelling and victualling had been performed. This was instead of undergoing repairs. She returned to Malta on 7 November. Endymion departed for Marseille on 11 November with the prince on board. During the voyage to Marseille, her engines broke down, causing damage to the engine's air pump, cylinders, pistons and trunk. She was ordered back to Malta for repairs, arriving on 22 November. On 27 November, her assistant-paymaster was court-martialled on board HMS Hibernia for being absent without leave. He was found guilty, losing a year's seniority and being dismissed from the ship.

On 30 January 1868, Endymion was caught by a squall whilst taking up her berth in Valletta Harbour. She collided with the Turkish ironclad Mahmoudiah, taking away her bowsprit and then colliding with HMS Lord Warden, damaging some boats and an accommodation ladder. Endymion was reported to be undamaged. On 18 March, Arethusa and Endymion departed for Naples, Italy, Endymion was carrying Rear-Admiral Kellett, who was going on leave to recuperate. The voyage was also to test her engines, which had taken four months to repair. She returned to Malta on 4 April. Endymion sailed on 26 May for Beyrout, in company with Lord Warden. She returned via Piraeus, Greece, arriving on 14 June. On 17 June, a first-class engineer from Endymion was court-martialled on board HMS Hibernia for drunkenness. He pleaded guilty and was sentenced to be dismissed from Her Majesty's Service. On 1 July, HMS Caledonia and Endymion departed Malta for Corfu and Venice, Italy. She departed from Venice on 27 July for Trieste. She arrived at Malta on 18 September. On 26 September, Endymion departed from Malta in company with Chiltern, Newport and Scanderia, which were laying a new submarine cable between Malta and Alexandria, which was reached on 6 October. She then sailed to Brindisi, Italy to collect Lord Napier of Magdala, arriving on 15 November. Endymion was the first British frigate to enter Brindisi Harbour. She sailed for Alexandria on 19 November, arriving on 24 November. She then sailed to Malta, arriving on 6 December. She was then dry docked to enable her bottom to be cleaned.

Endymion left the dry dock on 7 January 1869. On 26 January, a sub-lieutenant serving on board HMS Defence was court-martialled on board HMS Hibernia for false accounting in connection with the gun-room wine accounts whilst serving on board Endymion during 1867. He was further charged with destroying part of the issue-book relating to the wine accounts. The first charge was found to be partly proved, whilst he was found not guilty on the second charge. He was sentenced to be dismissed from Her Majesty's Service. She sailed from Malta on 27 January in the company of HMS Wizard bound for Gibraltar. She was reported to be at Cádiz, Spain on 11 February, and at Gibraltar a month later. She departed on 22 March for Málaga, Spain, where she arrived on 3 April. She then received orders to sail to England to join the Flying Squadron. Endymion sailed to Spithead via Lisbon, Portugal, arriving on 1 May. On 21 May 1869, Edward Lacy took command of Endymion. She sailed on 10 June for Plymouth Sound. Endymion was to join a Flying Squadron which was to sail around the world. The other ships were HMS Bristol, HMS Liffey, HMS Liverpool and HMS Scylla. HMS Barossa was to join the squadron at Bahia, Brazil once her repairs had been completed. Scylla was the fastest, and Endymion was the slowest of the six ships. Barossa caught up with the squadron by the time Madeira was reached on 1 July. The squadron departed for Bahia the next day. On 9 July, a race under sail was held between the six ships. Endymion was sixth and last, behind Barossa, which was 24½ cables (4.54 km) ahead. The squadron departed from Bahia on 4 August, minus Bristol, which returned to Plymouth. The squadron then sailed to Rio de Janeiro, Argentina, departing on 26 July for Montevideo, Uruguay, where the squadron arrived on 6 August. During the voyage from Rio de Janeiro, a fatal case of yellow fever was reported on board one of the ships. The squadron departed on 11 September for The Cape, where it arrived on 4 October. Bristol rejoined the squadron there. The squadron departed from Cape Town on 16 October bound for Melbourne, Victoria. On 9 November, the squadron was caught in a storm and scattered, with all ships sustaining some damage to their rigging and sails. The squadron reached Melbourne on 26 November, anchoring in the mouth of the Yarra Yarra River at Williamstwon. The citizens of Melbourne gave the squadron an enthusiastic welcome. It sailed for Sydney on 7 December, arriving on 12 December. On 29 December, the squadron sailed for Hobart, Tasmania.

On 2 January 1870, the Flying Squadron arrived at Hobart. It sailed on 10 January for New Zealand. Arrival at Auckland was on 2 February, with the squadron departing six days later for Japan. On 6 April, the squadron arrived at Yokohama, departing on 14 April for Yedo and returning to Yokohama on 17 April and sailing again on 19 April. Its destination was Vancouver Island, which was reached in May, departing on 28 May for Valparaíso, Chile, via Honolulu, Hawaii, departing from there on 22 June. The squadron arrived at Valparaíso on 14 August. At this point it comprised Charybdis, Endymion, Liffey Liverpool and Pearl. The squadron sailed on 28 August, and rounded Cape Horn on 13 September. The circumnavigation was completed on 21 September, and was celebrated by the order of "splice the mainbrace" being given. On 2 October, one of the boys serving on Endymion fell overboard. He was a non-swimmer and Sub-Lieutenant Jones dived in and came to his rescue, the boy being unharmed. The squadron arrived at Bahia on 6 October, sailing three days later. An intended call at Fayal, Azores was abandoned due to unfavourable weather conditions. The squadron arrived at Plymouth on 15 November. Endymion arrived at Spithead on 17 November 1870. She was then ordered to be dis-masted and paid off, Her lower masts and rigging were retained, and she was paid off on 30 November, with a view to a quick recommission.

Endymion departed from Portsmouth under steam on 6 February 1871 for trials off Spithead, returning to port that day. On 24 April 1872, Edward Madden took command of Endymion, which was then in use as a training ship for cadets. On 28 May, personnel on leave from Endymion were recalled as the ship had received orders to sail immediately. She undertook a short cruise in the English Channel, arriving back at Spithead on 3 June. She then sailed for Gibraltar, putting into Plymouth on 19 June to land a sailor who had fallen from the rigging. She was at Lisbon on 12 August, She departed from Gibraltar on 24 August heading west. She sailed to Vigo, Spain, where she joined the Mediterranean Squadron, comprising HMS Aurora, HMS Invincible, HMS Lord Warden, HMS Pallas, HMS Research and HMS Swiftsure. The squadron arrived at Gibraltar on 2 October. Endymion departed on 9 October and headed west. She sailed to Plymouth, departing on 27 October for Portsmouth, arriving on 1 November. She then underwent a refit. Replacement fore and main masts were fitted. These had come from HMS Mersey and were heavier than those previously installed on Endymion, leading to doubts over her stability. She was reported to be ready for active service in December 1871.

On 11 May 1872, Endymion was inspected at Portsmouth by Admiral Sir George Mundy KCB, before departing for Portland that evening. She was described as being armed with 22 guns. She later departed for Gibraltar, arriving on 30 June. She sailed on 6 July to join the Mediterranean Squadron. On 12 July, Endymion anchored in the Tagus at Lisbon. She later returned to Gibraltar, remaining behind when the squadron sailed as a court-martial was to be held on board. The engineer of HMS Hart was sentenced to be dismissed from the ship with the loss of a year's seniority and a severe reprimand. Following the conclusion of the court-martial, Endymion joined the squadron at Vigo, Spain on 14 August. The squadron departed on 21 September, for a cruise around the Mediterranean, with an eventual destination of Malta. It arrived off Lisbon on 24 September, Endymion left the squadron at Gibraltar, sailing on 7 October for England in company of Aurora. She towed the French barque Lutin in to Gibraltar that day. The barque had been in collision with the Italian steamship La Pampa off Europa Point and had become waterlogged. Endymion was carrying Sir J Drummond Hay, and took him to Tangier, Morocco, leaving immediately after he had disembarked. She called at Lisbon, arriving on 15 October and departing the next day. She arrived at Portsmouth on 31 October. Endymion then underwent a refit. New masts were fitted, which were brought to Portsmouth on board HMS Valorous. On 5 November, a court-martial was held at Portsmouth on board Duke of Wellington of a boy who was accused of the theft of £8 7s 6d belonging to No.7 mess and its caterer. He was found guilty and sentenced to three months' imprisonment at Lewes Gaol.

On 11 January 1873, a court-martial was held at Portsmouth on board HMS Duke of Wellington of an able seaman from Endymion who was charged with desertion and attempting to obtain money by fraudulent means. He pleaded guilty and was sentenced to two years' imprisonment at Winchester Gaol. The first seven days in each month to be kept in solitary confinement and the rest of the time to be kept at hard labour. At the termination of his imprisonment he was to be dismissed with disgrace. On 19 January, Endymion was undergoing trials in the Channel when she was caught in a storm. A rating was lost overboard and she lost her jib-boom and two boats. Her new foremast was damaged. Following repairs at Portsmouth, she sailed on 22 January for Vigo, her arrival being reported in The Times of 4 February. Endymion departed from Vigo on 6 February in company of HMS Aurora, HMS Doris and HMS Topaze. She was bound for Barbados. Vigo was reached in early February, with the squadron sailing on 6 February. Endymion sailed to Martinique whilst the rest of the squadron sailed to Saint Vincent. The squadron regrouped at Guadeloupe on 3 April and then sailed to Martinique, arriving at Saint Pierre on 5 April. The squadron then sailed to Port Royal, Jamaica, arriving on 14 May. The squadron then sailed to Gibraltar, where they had arrived by the end of August. On 18 September, Henry Hickley took command of Endymion. In September, Endymion was one of several ships ordered to lay off Valencia, Spain where there was an insurgency. Ironclads owned by the Canton of Murcia were crewed by convicts. Questions were asked about whether or not this deprived them of any protection under the laws of war. She was lying off Barcelona by the end of October, departing on 27 October, and arriving at Valencia on 5 November. Endymion arrived at Gibraltar on 2 December. She departed on 13 December for Málaga, Spain, where she was to relieve Doris.

Endymion departed on 5 January 1874 for Malta, calling at Portmán, Spain on 12 January. Endymion arrived at Malta on 15 February. She departed from Malta on 8 March for Corfu, as part of the Mediterranean Squadron. The other ships were HMS Doris, HMS Immortalité, HMS Narcissus and HMS Topaze. On 10 May, Endymion and Narcissus both ran aground in Palermo Bay, with Narcissus losing 27 feet (8.2 m) of her false keel and being holed in two places. Both ships put into Cagliari, Sardinia. Rear-Admiral Randolph, in charge of the squadron, was court-martialled on board HMS Royal Adelaide at Devonport. He was unanimously acquitted. The squadron arrived at Port Mahon, Spain on 1 June. Doris was ordered to leave the squadron and proceed to Gibraltar under steam. Endymion was ordered to proceed to Devonport, She departed on 13 June, arriving at Plymouth on 4 July. After a spell on guard off the Isle of Wight, where Queen Victoria was staying at Osborne House, she arrived at the Medway on 23 July for paying off. Endymion left Cowes on 21 July, and was replaced by an ironclad. She sailed to Portsmouth for paying off. On 27 July, an able seaman from Endymion was court-martialled on board HMS Duncan at The Nore. He was charged with being in contempt of an officer and conduct prejudicial to good order and discipline. He was found guilty and sentenced to one year's hard labour and to be dismissed from the Navy.Endymion was sent to the Humber for coast guard duties.

=== Guard ship ===
Endymion was at Hull, Yorkshire by October. Endymion sailed from Hull in July for Plymouth. HMS Iron Duke replaced her on guard ship duties. Both ships sailed in company from Devonport on 30 July for Portland.

On 17 January 1875, a court-martial was held on board Duke of Wellington as Portsmouth of a leading seaman from Endymion who was charged with indecent assault and inducing another to commit the same offence; he was found guilty on the second charge. He was sentenced to five years imprisonment as a close prisoner. On 1 April, a court-martial was held on board Duncan at The Nore of a marine serving in Endymion who was accused of assaulting a corporal in the execution of his duties. He pleaded guilty and was sentenced to two years' hard labour and dismissal from the service.Endymion returned to Chatham in August for her annual refit. Her crew transferred to HMS Iron Duke. In September, she was towed from Sheerness to Devonport by the Admiralty tugs Camel and Grinder, her boilers having been condemned as unfit for service. It was intended that Endymion would be stationed at Harwich, Essex where she was to replace HMS Penelope as the flagship of the Admiral Superintendent of the Naval Reserve. That plan was cancelled due to the loss of HMS Vanguard, with that ship's crew transferring to Iron Duke, with her crew transferring back to Endymion. Endymion departed from Devonport on 4 November for Hull, where she was to take up coast guard duties. As her boilers had not been repaired, she departed under sail. On 13 December, a court-martial was held on board Duke of Wellington at Portsmouth of an able seaman from Endymion charged with three counts of insubordination and disobedience. He pleaded guilty and was sentenced to three years' imprisonment at Lewes Gaol. The first seven days in each month to be kept in solitary confinement and the rest of the time to be kept at hard labour.

On 23 February 1876, a private in the Royal Marines serving on board Endymion was court-martialled on a charge of insubordination; he pleaded guilty and was sentenced to two years' imprisonment. On 7 March, a fire broke out in the yard of Humphrys & Pearson Ltd, shipbuilders, located in the Victoria Dock. A range of workshops was destroyed, and the ship Sylph, then under construction, was severely damaged. Her rigging and port side were burnt. Royal Marines from Endymion and HMS Pheasant assisted in the firefighting operations. On Ascension Day, a salute was fired by Endymion in honour of the Queen. This caused two windows to fall out of a building in Scale Lane, Hull, injuring two passers-by. On 14 August, a fire broke out at a timber yard in Hull. Crewmen from Dauntless, Endymion and Mermaid assisted the Hull police in fighting the fire. Nine days later, crewmen from Endymion gave assistance at another fire at a timber yard in Drypool. John Moresby took command of Endymion on 29 September 1876.

In 1877, she remained stationed on the Humber; HMS Pheasant was her tender until Pheasant was sent to Sheerness in June for paying off and decommissioning, being replaced by HMS Ariel. On 9 September, a fire developed in a fish merchant's shop in Church Lane, Hull. Men from Endymion assisted in fighting the fire. Shortly after the fire had been extinguished, Holy Trinity Church was discovered to be on fire. It was suspected that sparks from the fire at the fish merchant's shop had caused this fire, which was extinguished without doing any major damage.

On 6 March 1878, Henry Woollcombe took command of Endymion. This was due to the death of Rear-Admiral William Charles Chamberlain, Superintendent at Devonport. Captain Leveson Somerset, in command at Bermuda was promoted to the vacated position. Moresby was promoted to the Bermuda position and Woollcombe was promoted to replace him as captain of Endymion. On 12 April, a fire developed in shops at the Market Place, Hull. Forty marines from Endymion assisted the Hull Police in fighting the fire. They brought a hand pump but was unable to use it owing to incompatibility of the hose and hydrant, being different sizes. On 22 August, a private in the Royal Marines was court-martialled at Portsmouth for desertion from Endymion. He pleaded guilty and was sentenced to six months imprisonment and dismissal from service.

In March 1879, a butcher in Hull launched a lawsuit to recover £47 in respect of meat supplied to the officers of the wardroom mess. A mess-man by the name of Jones had collected monies from various crew, but not paid the butcher. The jury found in favour of the plaintiff, even though notices had been placed in the local press stating that Jones was not authorised to pledge the credit of the officers on board Endymion. A notice which the plaintiff claimed not to have seen. Endymion departed from Hull under tow on 6 July. She arrived at Chatham on 10 July 1879 to be replaced on the Humber by HMS Audacious, with her crew transferring to that ship, including Captain Woollacombe. Endymion was placed in the fourth division of the Medway Steam Reserve. Endymion was decommissioned on 31 July.

=== Administration and hospital ship ===
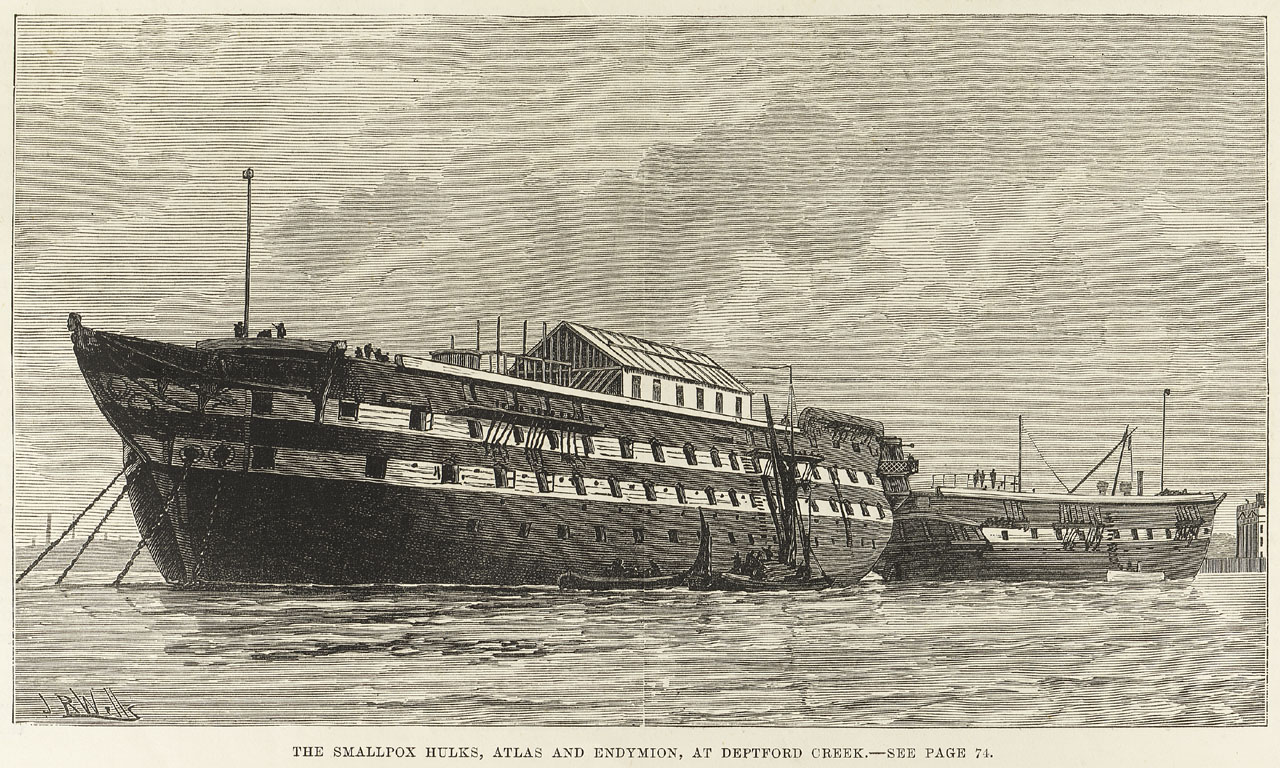
Atlas and Endymion in Deptford Creek, Kent, 1881.

In June 1881, the Lords of the Admiralty agreed to lend HMS Atlas and Endymion to the Metropolitan Asylums Board along with a steam pinnace, due to an epidemic of smallpox in London. Endymion was to serve as an administration ship. She was towed out of Chatham on 25 June and towed to Greenwich, Kent, on 29 June. She was to be used as a hospital ship for patients infected with smallpox, although Endymion was supposed to be an administrative ship. Atlas was acquired by the board on 4 June, and Endymion on 5 July. The plans for the conversion of Atlas and Endymion were drawn up by Messrs A & C Hartson, the architects to the board. A gangway connected the two ships. Conversion of Atlas and Endymion cost £11,000. Endymion provided accommodation for the staff serving on the ships, as well as kitchen and laundry facilities. She also provided heating for the ships, as well as laundry and the repair of the patient's clothes being done on board.

The location of the ships drew an objection from the shipbuilders J. and G. Rennie because some of their employees refused to work near the riverside where Atlas was moored. It was also necessary to move Atlas and Endymion every time Rennie's launched a ship. In 1882, the Thames Conservancy wrote to the Metropolitan Asylums Board urging them to move Atlas and Endymion from Greenwich. The Thames Conservancy also called upon the board to pay a large claim for expenses incurred by Messrs Rennie's. At a meeting of the board, it was suggested that if moved, Atlas should be used for convalescent patients. The board decided to await the report from a Royal Commission into infectious diseases hospitals before deciding whether or not to move the ships. The last smallpox patients left Atlas in August 1882. The Metropolitan Asylums Board decided that the ships provided a useful facility and that they would be kept; in 1883, they were moved downstream to Long Reach, near Dartford.

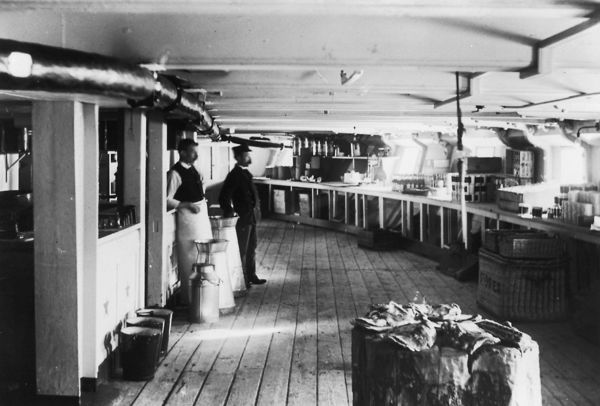
The galley on board Endymion

In 1884, Atlas and Endymion were joined by a third hospital ship, the former cross-Channel paddle steamer Castalia. In February 1885, a meeting of the Metropolitan Asylums Board was informed that the Admiralty had stated that it the board wished to continue using Atlas and Endymion, they would have to purchase them at a cost of £8,400 and £6,500 respectively. The board replied that they would purchase the ships, but asked for the cost to be reduced. In June, it was reported that the board were authorised to purchase both ships. On 2 January 1902, a fire broke out on board Endymion. The Metropolitan Fire Brigade and the fireboat Alpha attended. Endymion served in this rôle until 1904, when the new Joyce Green Hospital opened at Dartford, Kent. Endymion was sold by auction at the Bull Hotel, Dartford, Kent, in December 1904 for breaking. Endymion sold for £3,200. Along with Atlas and Castalia, a total of £8,045 was realised. The ships were to be removed within two months or a rental of £25 per week would then be payable.
