= Evangelista =

Evangelista may refer to:

== People ==
=== Given name ===
- Evangelista Andreoli (1810–1875), Italian organist, pianist, and teacher
- Evangelista Cittadini, Italian Roman Catholic Bishop of Alessano (1542–1549)
- Evangelista da Pian di Meleto (c. 1460–1549), Italian painter of the Renaissance period
- Evangelista Gennaro Gorga (1865–1957), Italian lyric tenor
- Evangelista Martinotti (1634–1694), Italian painter of the Baroque period
- Evangelista Menga (c. 1480–c. 1571), Italian military engineer
- Evangelista Santos (born 1977), Brazilian mixed martial arts fighter
- Evangelista Schiano, Italian painter, mainly of sacred subjects, active in 1755-77
- Evangelista Tornioli, O.S.B. (1570–1630), Italian Roman Catholic Bishop of Città di Castello (1616–1630)
- Evangelista Torricelli (1608–1647), Italian physicist and mathematician
- Fernando Evangelista Iglesias (born 1991), Argentine football defender
- Giovanni Evangelista Draghi (1654–1712), Italian painter
- Giovanni Evangelista Pallotta, (also named Palotta or Palotto (1548–1620), Italian Roman Catholic Cardinal
- Giovanni Evangelista Pelleo, O.F.M. Conv. (died 1595), Italian Roman Catholic Bishop of Sant'Agata de' Goti
- Jan Evangelista Purkyně (1787–1869), Czech anatomist, patriot, and physiologist
- João Evangelista Belfort Duarte (1883–1918), Brazilian football central defender
- Jucimara Evangelista Dantas (born 1978), Brazilian basketball player
- Juan Evangelista Venegas (c. 1928 – 1980), first Puerto Rican to win an Olympic medal
- Laura Evangelista Alvarado Cardozo, Blessed (1875-1967), Venezuelan Roman Catholic founder of the Augustinian Recollect Sisters of the Heart of Jesus
- Lucas Evangelista Santana de Oliveira (born 1995), Brazilian professional football central midfielder
- Marcílio Luís Evangelista dos Santos (born 1964), Brazilian former football forward
- Marcos Evangelista de Moraes (born 1970), known as Cafu, Brazilian former professional football defender
- Marcos Evangelista Pérez Jiménez (1914–2001), Venezuelan military and general officer of the Army of Venezuela
- Paulo Afonso Evangelista Vieira (21st century), member of the PMDB of Santa Catarina

=== Surname ===
- Alfredo Evangelista (born 1954), former Uruguayan-Spaniard boxer
- Alfredo E. Evangelista (1926–2008), Filipino archeologist
- Armando Evangelista Macedo Freitas (born 1973), Portuguese football manager and former player
- Benjamin Evangelista (born 1949), Filipino former cyclist
- Billy Evangelista, American mixed martial arts fighter
- Christine Evangelista (born 1986) is an American actress
- Crisanto Evangelista (1888–1943), Filipino Communist politician and labor leader
- Daniella Evangelista (born 1982), Canadian actress and model
- David Evangelista (21st century), fashion journalist
- Diego Evangelista dos Santos (born 1989), Brazilian footballer
- Ed Evangelista (21st century), judge for the first season of ABC's reality television show American Inventor
- Edilberto Evangelista (1862–1897), Filipino civil engineer and revolutionary
- Frankie Evangelista (1934–2004), Filipino radio and television broadcaster of ABS-CBN since 1953
- Heart Evangelista (born 1985), Filipino actress, singer, model, and VJ
- Irineu Evangelista de Sousa, Viscount of Mauá (1813–1889)
- Johannes Evangelista Gossner (1773-1858), German divine and philanthropist
- José Evangelista (1943–2023), Spanish composer and music educator
- Larissa Evangelista (born 1988), Brazilian group rhythmic gymnast
- Linda Evangelista (born 1965), Canadian supermodel
- Lucy Evangelista (born 1986), 2005 Miss Northern Ireland
- Luke Evangelista (born 2001), Canadian professional hockey player
- Neto Evangelista (born 1988), Brazilian politician
- Nick Evangelista (born 1949), fencing master, author, and magazine publisher
- Patricia Evangelista, Filipino journalist and documentary filmmaker
- Paulo Afonso Evangelista Vieira, Brazilian federal deputy and member of the PMDB of Santa Catarina
- Rey Evangelista (born 1971), Filipino former professional basketball player
- Reynaldo G. Evangelista, OFS, DD, Filipino Roman Catholic bishop of Imus
- Romeu Evangelista (born 1950), also known as Romeu Cambalhota, former Brazilian footballer
- Stefanie Evangelista (born 1989), beauty pageant titleholder
- Tony Evangelista (born 1945), Canadian FIFA referee

== See also ==
- Evangelist (disambiguation)
- Evangelistas Islets, a group of four islands that come under the jurisdiction of the Chilean Navy
- Evangelisti, a surname
- Italian submarine Evangelista Torricelli, a list of ships
