= Martinotti =

Martinotti may refer to:

- Martinotti cell, small multipolar neurons with short branching dendrites
- Metodo Martinotti, an Italian industrial method for the sparkling wine production

== People ==
- Evangelista Martinotti (1634–1694), an Italian painter of the Baroque period
- Brian R. Martinotti (born 1961), a United States District judge
- Federico Martinotti (1860–1924), developer of the Charmat method in sparkling wine production

== See also ==
- Martini (disambiguation)
