= Ister-class frigate =

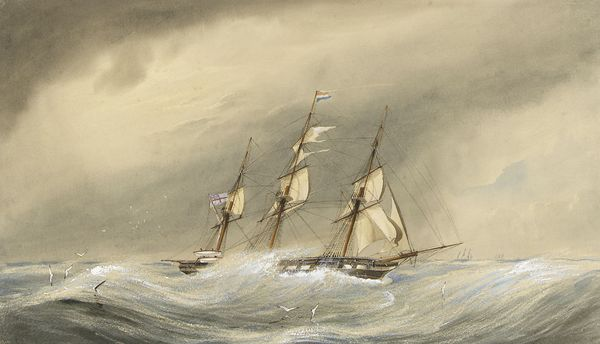
- HMS Endymion rounding the Cape of Good Hope.

Class overview
- Name: Ister-class frigate
- Builders: Deptford Dockyard, Devonport Dockyard, Woolwich Dockyard
- Operators: Royal Navy
- Preceded by: Bristol class
- Succeeded by: None
- Built: 1860–66
- In service: 1866–1885
- In commission: 1866–1879
- Planned: 5
- Completed: 1
- Canceled: 4
- Scrapped: 1

General characteristics HMS Endymion
- Displacement: 3,200 long tons (3,300 t)
- Tons burthen: 2486
- Length: 240 ft (73.2 m)
- Beam: 48 ft (14.6 m)
- Draught: 18 ft 8 in (5.69 m)
- Installed power: 1,620 ihp (1,210 kW)
- Propulsion: 1 shaft, 1 Steam engine
- Speed: 12.5 knots (23.2 km/h; 14.4 mph)
- Complement: 450
- Armament: 4 × 100-pounder Somerset guns; 3 × 110-pounder RBL 7 inch Armstrong guns; 14 × 8-inch guns

The Ister-class frigates were a group of five 36-gun screw frigates ordered for the Royal Navy in the early 1860s. Four of the ships were cancelled after they were laid down and HMS Endymion was the only ship completed.

== Description ==
Endymion was 240 feet (73.2 m) long, with a beam of 48 feet (14.6 m), and a draught of 18 feet 8 inches (5.69 m). She was assessed as 2,486 tons Builder's Old Measurement and displaced 3,200 tons. She was fitted with 36 guns and had a complement of 450. Propulsion was by a 500 nhp steam engine, which was built by Napier & Sons, Glasgow. The engine drove a single screw propeller of 18 feet (5.49 m) diameter and 21 feet (6.40 m) pitch. The propeller was 3 feet 6 inches (1.07 m) long, and the tips of the blades were 7 feet 6 inches (2.29 m) beneath the surface of the water.

She was designed to take 36 guns, which were intended to comprise four 100 pounder, rifled muzzle-loading guns (weight 125 Cwt/6,350 kg each), fourteen 8-inch guns (65 Cwt/3,302 kg each), located on the maindeck; and nine 110-pounder breech-loading guns (82 Cwt/6,166 kg each) located on the upper deck. In August, it was reported that Endymion was then being fitted with three 110-pounder Armstrong guns, four 100-pounder Somerset guns and fourteen 8-inch guns.

== Service ==
Name	Builder	Laid down	Launched	Completed	Fate
HMS Astraea	Devonport Dockyard	21 October 1861	N/A	N/A	Cancelled 12 December 1863
HMS Blonde	Woolwich Dockyard	10 September 1860	N/A	N/A	Cancelled 12 December 1863
HMS Dartmouth	Woolwich Dockyard	6 November 1860	N/A	N/A	Cancelled 16 December 1864
HMS Endymion	Deptford Dockyard	20 October 1860	18 November 1865	September 1866	Sold 1885, scrapped 1905
HMS Ister	Devonport Dockyard	8 November 1860	N/A	N/A	Cancelled 16 December 1864

All five of the ships in the class were laid down in 1860–61 in various royal dockyards, but HMS Blonde and HMS Astrea were cancelled on 12 December 1863. HMS Dartmouth and HMS Ister were cancelled a year later, on 16 December 1864. None of these four ships were launched before they were cancelled.

On 1 February 1862, construction of Endymion was suspended on the orders of the Admiralty, although the Admiralty later decided that she would be completed. Construction restarted on 7 February 1864. Endymion was the last wooden frigate built at Deptford Dockyard. She was commissioned in 1866 and spent much of her service based at Malta. In 1869–70 she sailed around the world as part of a Flying Squadron. Endymion then served as a guard ship at Hull until 1879 and was lent to the Metropolitan Asylums Board in 1881 for use as an administration and hospital ship. She was sold out of service in 1885, and served as an administration ship until 1904. Endymion was sold in December 1904 and broken up in 1905.
