= -ista =

Suffix used in some European languages and in English

-ista may refer to:

== Disambiguation ==
Words or titles ending in -ista may refer to:

- Baptista (disambiguation), a surname
- Barista, a person who prepares and serves coffee
- Calista (disambiguation), a place or given name
- Callista (disambiguation), a genus of molluscs or a personal name
- Corbynista, a supporter of Labour Party leader Jeremy Corbyn
- Evangelista (disambiguation), a personal name borne by many notable people
- Fashionista (disambiguation), relating to fashion
- Protista, a biological kingdom name for diverse eukaryotic microorganisms
- Sandinista, relating to a Nicaraguan political movement or party
- Stylista, an American fashion-themed reality-television competition
- Zapatista, referring to followers of Emiliano Zapata or his ideas

== As a linguistic suffix ==
-ista is a suffix of Romance origin, used in some European languages and also in English to denote a person associated with a belief, profession, or activity. In English, it typically forms nouns referring to a supporter, devotee, or practitioner of something, comparable to -ist but often carrying a foreign or stylistic nuance (for example, fashionista, barista).

== Etymology and history ==
The suffix ultimately derives from the Ancient Greek -ιστής (-istḗs), an agent-noun ending used to describe a person engaged in or devoted to an activity (for example, βαπτιστής baptistḗs, “one who baptizes”).

From Greek it passed into Latin as -ista, where it formed nouns of agency or allegiance (for instance, machinista). The suffix was then inherited by the Romance languages, especially Spanish, Italian, and Portuguese, with meanings such as "adherent, practitioner, or partisan".

French, also a Romance language, developed the cognate suffix -iste (e.g., pianiste, socialiste), reflecting the same Greek–Latin origin but a different phonological evolution within Gallo-Romance.

English adopted *-ista* primarily through Spanish and Italian. Its earliest appearance is in scientific Latin formations such as Protista, coined by Ernst Haeckel in 1866 for a biological kingdom; this use reflects the learned Latin plural of Greek -istēs ("the first beings").

In general vocabulary, early political loans include Zapatista (first English evidence 1911). Later, the Nicaraguan term Sandinista was first recorded in 1974, followed by borrowings with professional or fashionable meanings such as barista (1982) and fashionista (1993). In the 21st century, the pattern appears in English political slang, as in Corbynista (documented from 2015).

== See also ==
- -ist
- -ism
- Suffix
