= Ister =

Ister, The Ister, or Der Ister may refer to:

- The Danube river, known as the Ister in Latin and Istros (Ἴστρος) in Ancient Greek and Thracian
- The Dniester river, known as the Ister in Thracian
- "Der Ister", a poem by Friedrich Hölderlin
  - Hölderlin's Hymn "The Ister", a lecture course delivered by Martin Heidegger in 1942
- Ister-class frigate, a group of screw frigates ordered for the Royal Navy in the early 1860s
- The Ister (film), a 2004 film directed by David Barison and Daniel Ross
- Tajuria ister, a butterfly of the family Lycaenidae
- Ister of Cyrene (fl. 240s BC), Greek historian

== See also ==
- Ista (disambiguation)
- de:Donau#Namen und Etymologie, German etymology and similarly named rivers
