= Vangelisti =

Vangelisti is a surname. Notable people with the surname include:

- Paul Vangelisti (born 1945), American poet and broadcaster
- Vincenzio Vangelisti (c. 1740–1798), Italian engraver

== See also ==
- Evangelisti
