= HMS Enterprise (1864) =

Armoured sloop from UK

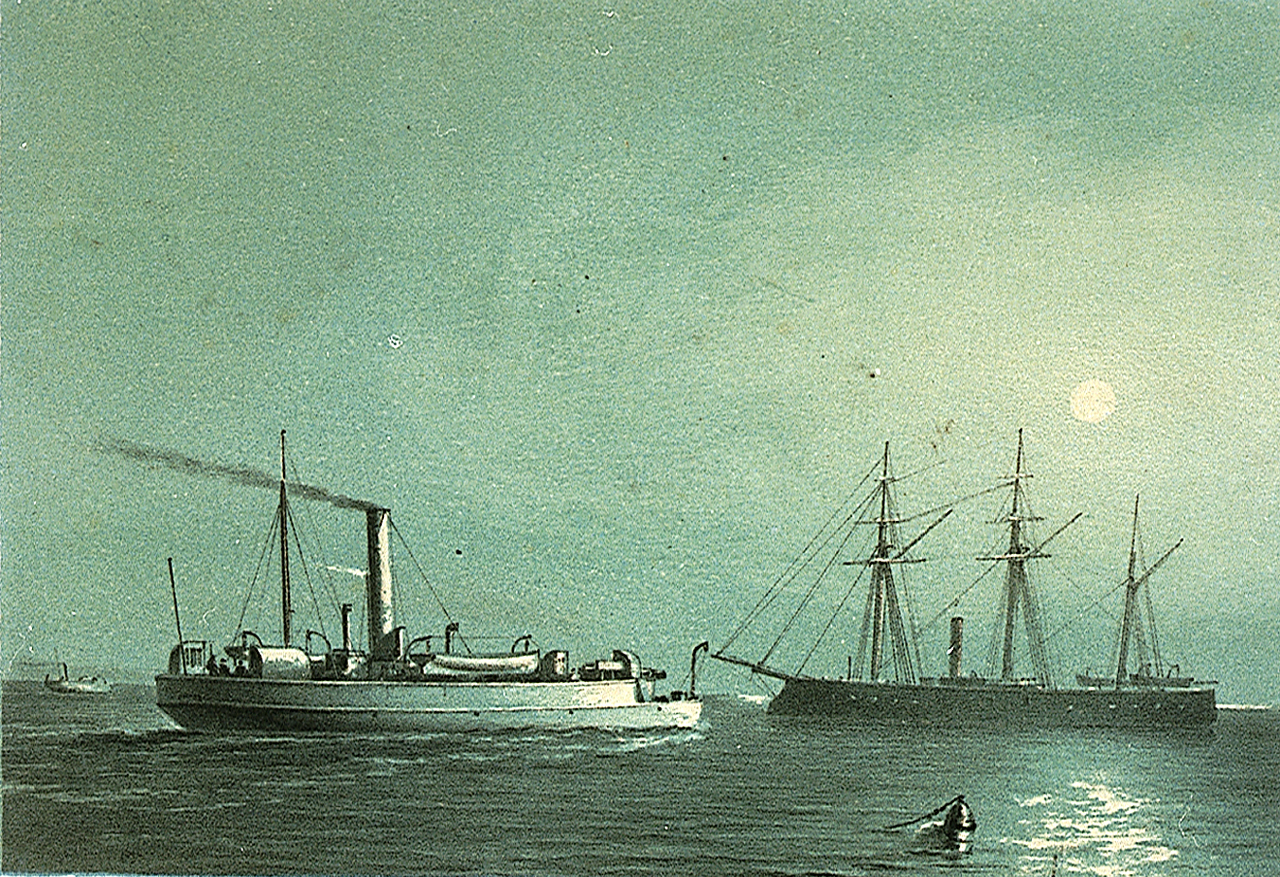
- HMCB Comet and HMS EnterpriseHM Gunboat Comet (left) and HMS Enterprise (right)

History

United Kingdom
- Name: HMS Enterprise
- Ordered: 1861
- Builder: Deptford Dockyard, Deptford, England
- Cost: £62,464
- Laid down: 5 May 1862
- Launched: 9 February 1864
- Completed: 3 June 1864
- Commissioned: 5 May 1864
- Fate: Sold 1885

General characteristics
- Type: Ironclad sloop
- Displacement: 1,350 long tons (1,370 t)
- Tons burthen: 994 bm
- Length: 180 ft (54.9 m) pp; 152 ft 11 1/2 in (46.6 m) (keel)
- Beam: 36 ft (11.0 m)
- Draught: 15 ft 8 in (4.8 m)
- Installed power: 160 nhp; 692 ihp (516 kW)
- Propulsion: 2-cylinder direct-acting horizontal single-expansion steam engine; 2 × tubular boilers; 1 × shaft
- Sail plan: Barque-rigged; 18,250 sq ft (1,695.5 m^{2}) sail area
- Speed: 9.9 knots (18.3 km/h; 11.4 mph)
- Complement: 130
- Armament: As built: 2 × 100-pounder (234 mm) Somerset cannons; 2 × 7-inch (178 mm) Armstrong breech-loaders; From 1868 : 4 × 7-inch (178 mm) 6½ ton rifled muzzle-loading guns
- Armour: Belt: 4.5 in (114 mm); Bulkheads: 4.5 in (114 mm)

The seventh HMS Enterprise of the Royal Navy was an armoured sloop launched in 1864 at Deptford Dockyard. Originally laid down as a wooden screw sloop of the Camelion class, she was redesigned by Edward Reed and completed as a central battery ironclad. The ship spent the bulk of her career assigned to the Mediterranean Fleet before returning to England in 1871 where she was paid off. Enterprise was sold for scrap in 1885.

== Design and description ==
The ship had a length between perpendiculars of 180 feet (54.9 m), a beam of 36 feet (11.0 m), and a draught of 15 feet 10 inches (4.83 m) at deep load. She displaced 1,350 long tons (1,370 t). Her crew consisted of 130 officers and men.

Enterprise's wooden hull was remodeled shortly after she was laid down; she was given a plough-shaped ram bow and a semi-circular stern. The ship had only two decks: the main deck, very close to the ship's waterline, and the upper deck which carried her armament, about 6.5 feet (2.0 m) above the waterline. She was the first ship of composite construction in the Royal Navy, with iron upperworks.

=== Propulsion ===
Enterprise had a Ravenhill, Salkeld & Co. direct-acting horizontal single-expansion 2-cylinder direct acting steam engine driving a single propeller. Steam was provided by a pair of tubular boilers. The engine produced 690 indicated horsepower (510 kW) which gave the ship a maximum speed around 9.9 knots (18.3 km/h; 11.4 mph). Enterprise carried 95 long tons (97 t) of coal. As built, her funnel was mounted in the middle of the battery for protection, which impaired the working of her guns until it was relocated forward of the battery in November 1864. She was barque-rigged with three masts and had a sail area of 18,250 square feet (1,695 m^{2}). Her best speed under sail and steam was 9.8 knots (18.1 km/h; 11.3 mph).

=== Armament ===
Enterprise was armed with two 100-pounder smoothbore, muzzle-loading Somerset cannon and two rifled 110-pounder breech-loading guns. The breech-loading guns were of a new design from Armstrong and much was hoped for them. Firing tests carried out in September 1861 against an armoured target, however, proved that the 110-pounder was inferior to the 68-pounder smoothbore gun in armour penetration, and repeated incidents of breech explosions during the Battles for Shimonoseki and the Bombardment of Kagoshima in 1863–64 caused the navy to withdraw the guns from service shortly afterwards.

In an attempt to provide axial fire the sides of the hull at the upper deck level were cut away in front and behind the battery and covered by a 12-foot (3.7 m) bulwark. The bulwark hinged inwards and covered a gun port though which a gun could traverse and fire. While providing better coverage than the traditional broadside layout this still left a 120° arc forward and another aft on which no gun could bear.

The 9.2-inch (234 mm) solid shot of the Somerset gun weighed approximately 113 pounds (51 kg) while the gun itself weighed 13,514 pounds (6,130 kg). The gun had a velocity of 1,462 ft/s (446 m/s) at 563 feet (171.6 m) and had a range of 5,253 yards (4,803 m). The 7-inch (178 mm) shell of the 110-pounder Armstrong breech-loader weighed 107–110 pounds (48.5–49.9 kg). It had a muzzle velocity of 1,150 ft/s (350 m/s) and, at an elevation of 11.25°, a maximum range of 4,000 yards (3,700 m). The 110-pounder gun weighed 9,520 pounds (4,320 kg). All of the guns could fire both solid shot and explosive shells. Both guns were mounted on wooden gun carriages with slides "which were difficult to traverse even on an even keel; in a seaway few captains would have run the risk of casting them loose."

Enterprise was rearmed during her 1868 refit with four 7-inch (180 mm) rifled muzzle-loading guns. The 16-calibre 7-inch gun weighed 6.5 long tons (6.6 t) and fired a 112-pound (50.8 kg) shell. It was credited with the ability to penetrate 7.7-inch (196 mm) armour.

=== Armour ===
Enterprise had a complete waterline belt of wrought iron that was 4.5 inches (114 mm) thick. It protected only the main deck and was shallow, reaching just 3 feet 6 inches (1.1 m) below the waterline. The guns were protected by a section of 4.5-inch armour, 34 feet (10.4 m) long, and by 4.5-inch transverse bulkheads. The armour was backed by 19.5 inches (500 mm) of teak wood. The total weight of her armour was 195 long tons (198 t).

== Service ==
The ship was laid down on 5 May 1862 at the Royal Dockyard in Deptford, England, as the 17-gun sloop Circassian. She was renamed Enterprise in July 1862 and reclassified as an armoured corvette. Construction had barely begun before she was redesigned with an iron upper hull as well as armoured sides and battery. The ship was launched on 9 February 1864, commissioned on 5 May 1864 and completed on 3 June 1864. She cost £62,474 to build. Enterprise initially served with the Channel Fleet. On 13 August, she ran aground. Repairs cost £4. She was subsequently transferred to the Mediterranean Fleet where she remained until 1871 when she returned to England. She was refitted and rearmed at Malta in 1868. Upon her return the ship was paid off into 4th Class Reserve in August 1871 at Sheerness. Enterprise was sold for scrap in 1885 for £2,072. On 6 October 1889, Enterprise was being towed from Plymouth, Devon to Liverpool, Lancashire, when she was caught in a gale off the coast of Anglesey. She was driven ashore and wrecked at Aberffraw.
