= Ista =

Ista or ISTA may refer to:

== People ==
- Ernest Ista (1877–unknown), Belgian sports shooter, competitor at the 1908 Summer Olympics
- Kevyn Ista (born 1984), Belgian road bicycle racer
- the heroine of Paladin of Souls, a novel by Lois McMaster Bujold

== Acronym ==
- Indiana State Teachers Association
- Institute of Science and Technology Austria, a research institution
- International School of Temple Arts, an organization promoting alternative sex practices based on Western readings of tantra and shamanism
- International School of Theatre Anthropology (since 1979), based in the Odin Teatret, Denmark
- International School of Traditional Aikido, founded in France.
- International Schools Theatre Association, based in the United Kingdom, networked in schools such as The British School, New Delhi or Koç School
- International Seed Testing Association, an international non-profit seed testing organization
- International Society for Technology Assessment, related to Bryan Jennett, Fred Polak
- Internet Sacred Text Archive (since 1999), archive of cultural public domain texts

== Other uses ==
- -ista, a suffix used in Romance languages and occasionally in English
- Ista (Bangladesh), a place in the Jessore District, Khulna Division of Bangladesh
- Ista Pharmaceuticals or ISTA Pharmaceuticals, related to Calvin A. Grant, Hyaluronidase

== See also ==
- Ister (disambiguation)
