= Activate (app) =

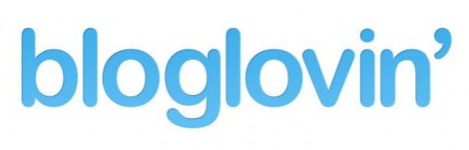
- Developer: Bloglovin'
- Release: November 2007
- Platform: Web browsers, iOS, Android
- Type: News aggregator / Social media
- Website: bloglovin.com

Activate (formerly Bloglovin') is a platform that allows users to read and organize blogs on mobile and desktop. It is a design-focused platform that aggregates feeds from sources with RSS feeds, allowing users to discover and organize content. Activate has apps on both iOS and Android. As of April 2014, Bloglovin reached over 16 million global users monthly.

== History ==
=== Founding and early years ===
Bloglovin' was founded in a garage in Täby, Sweden in 2007 by Dan Carlberg, Daniel Swenson, Patrik Ring, Mattias Swenson, and Daniel Gren. Launched as “Blogkoll” (Swedish for “to keep track of blogs”), the initial goal of Bloglovin' was to help fashion followers keep track of blogs without having to open up multiple tabs on their browsers. Bloglovin’ eventually developed into a platform that allows users to consume, organize, and discover disaggregated content.

In October 2011, Bloglovin' registered its 1 millionth user.

=== Funding and growth ===
==== 2012 ====
In 2012, Bloglovin' raised $1 million in Series A funding from investors including Betaworks, Lerer Ventures, RRE Ventures, Hank P. Vigil & Fritz Lanman, Eric Martineau-Fortin, Rob Wiesenthal, Jill Greenthal, and Investment AB Kinnevik.

==== 2013 ====
In January 2013, Bloglovin' moved their headquarters to New York. The company continues to have an office in Stockholm, Sweden. Bloglovin' experienced a significant growth in signups following the demise of Google Reader. In May 2013, the site launched a major redesign, which included changes allowing users to curate content. In September 2013, The Next Web included Bloglovin' on its list of "50 New York City Start-ups You Need to Know About."

==== 2014 ====
In February 2014, Joy Marcus, formerly a managing director at Gotham Ventures, was appointed chief executive officer of Bloglovin’. In April 2014, Bloglovin' raised $7 million in Series A funding. Investor Northzone led the round, and the founders of Babble and SoulCycle invested personally in the site. Additionally, Bloglovin' received further investment from previous funders Betaworks, Lerer Ventures, While Star Capital, and Bassett Investment Group. The investments were largely used for recruiting purposes.

==== Name Change and CEO ====
In April 2018, the company rebranded as Activate and replaced former Bloglovin CEO Giordano Contestabile with Kamiu Lee, formerly Bloglovin's vice president of strategy and business development. The platform launched Activate Studio at the same time. The company's decision to rebrand came shortly after Northzone made significant investments in the platform.

==== 2020 ====
On August 25, 2020, Activate was acquired by impact.com, a partnership management platform. The acquisition integrated Activate's influencer discovery, reporting, and campaign management platform into impact.com's Partnership Cloud, expanding the company's creator marketing capabilities and enabling brands to manage influencer partnerships alongside other partnership types through a single platform.

== Bloglovin' Awards ==
The Bloglovin' Awards were an annual awards ceremony held during New York Fashion Week by Bloglovin' to recognize bloggers in various categories. The awards were first held in 2011.

=== Bloglovin' Awards categories & nominees, 2014 ===
Category	Nominees	Winner
Best Personal Style Blog	The Blonde Salad, Kayture, Atlantic-Pacific, Tuula Vintage	The Blonde Salad
Best Mens Fashion Blog	I AM GALLA, Adam Gallagher, Dapper Lou, The Style Blogger	I AM GALLA
Best Fashion News Blog	Refinery29, Who What Wear, Fashionista, Style.com	Refinery29
Best Street Style Blog	Vivianna Does Makeup, Stockholm Street Style, The Sartorialist, Street Peeper	Vivianna Does Makeup
Best Celebrity Blog	Olivia Palermo, The Zoe Report, The Beauty Department, Go Fug Yourself	Olivia Palermo
Best Lifestyle Blog	Cupcakes and Cashmere, A Beautiful Mess, Camille Styles, Design*Sponge	Cupcakes and Cashmere
Best Writing	Into the Gloss, Man Repeller, The Coveteur, Rookie	Into the Gloss
Best Brand Blog	Madewell, Free People, J.Crew, Net-a-Porter	Madewell
Best Photography	Gary Pepper Girl, The Locals, The Coveteur, Vanessa Jackman	Gary Pepper Girl
Newcomer of the Year	Chapter Friday, Harper & Harley, They All Hate Us, Chronicles of Her	Chapter Friday
Blogger of the Year		Kayture

=== Bloglovin' Awards categories & nominees, 2012 ===
Category	Nominees	Winner
Arizona Newcomer of the Year	Tuula Vintage, Wendy's Lookbook, I SPY DIY, Honestly WTF	Olivia Palermo
Tibi Inspiration Award	The Coveteur, The Vogue Weekend, Textbook, Into the Gloss	Le Fashion
Fashion Traffic Blogger Business of the Year	Elin Kling – Nowhere, Tavi – RookieMag, Jennine – Independent Fashion Bloggers, Purseblog	Chiara Ferragni, Andy Torres, and Carolina Engman – Werelse
Best Personal Style Blog	Sea of Shoes, Atlantic Pacific, The Man Repeller, The Glamourai	Fashion Toast
Best International Blog	Garotas Estupidas, Ena Matsumoto, Momoko Ogihara, Lovelypepa	Kenza Zouiten
Best Fashion News Blog	Refinery29, Who What Wear, Women's Wear Daily, Stylecaster	Fashionista
Best Street Style Blog	Stockholm Street Style, Scott Schuman, Street Peeper, Streetfsn	Jak & Jil
Most Original Blog	Bryan Boy, Susie Bubble, Julia Frakes, Anna dello Russo	From Me to You
Blogger of the Year		The Man Repeller

=== Bloglovin' Awards categories & nominees, 2011 ===
Category	Nominees	Winner
Newcomer of the Year	Natalie Off Duty, Into the Gloss, Oracle Fox, Christeric	The Blonde Salad
Best Personal Style Blog	The Glamourai, Sea of Shoes, Cupcakes and Cashmere, Karla's Closet	Fashion Toast
Best Fashion News Blog	Refinery29, theCut, Fashionista, Fashionologie	Who What Wear
Best Street Style Blog	Jak & Jill, Garance Doré, Face Hunter, Streetpeper	The Sartorialist
Most Original Blog	Bryan Boy, Gala Darling, Bunny Bisous, Style Bubble	The Man Repeller
Blogger of the Year		Fashion Toast
