= Rumi Neely =

American fashion blogger

Rumi Neely is an American fashion blogger known for her style and photography.

== Biography ==
Neely created "Fashion Toast" in 2008 and in tandem with an eBay vintage store called "Treasure Chest Vintage." By 2009, it was receiving over 35,000 hits per day. The blog receives 5.5 million hits per month, according to Cision.

Represented by Next Modeling Management in the U.S. and Les Pros Entertainment in Japan, Rumi has collaborated with several well-known brands including producing a collection with sunglasses company Sunday Somewhere, additional design collaborations with The Reformation and Dannijo, modeling campaigns for Free People, RVCA and Forever 21 and partnerships with online retailers such as REVOLVE Clothing and Shopbop.

Neely also modeled in Bulgari's Save the Children campaign with Kristin Prim, which supported the fashion house's philanthropic efforts as well as for Rebecca Minkoff's Lincoln Center Fashion Presentation for Mercedes-Benz Fashion Week. She has won both the "Blogger of The Year" and "Best Personal Style Blog" at the Bloglovin' Awards. and the Industry Choice Award at the Socialyte Awards.

Neely has been profiled by CNN Money, Teen Vogue, Lucky magazine, Glamour, Elle, VOGUE Australia, Cosmopolitan magazine, The Wall Street Journal, New York Magazine, Fashionista, The Daily Mail, The Daily Beast, StyleCaster, Popsugar, among others.

In December 2014, Neely launched ARE YOU AM I, a luxury women's apparel line. To premiere the line, Neely partnered with REVOLVE Clothing for a limited run holiday pop-up at Los Angeles' The Grove shopping center.
