= HMS Reindeer (1866) =

Sloop of the Royal Navy

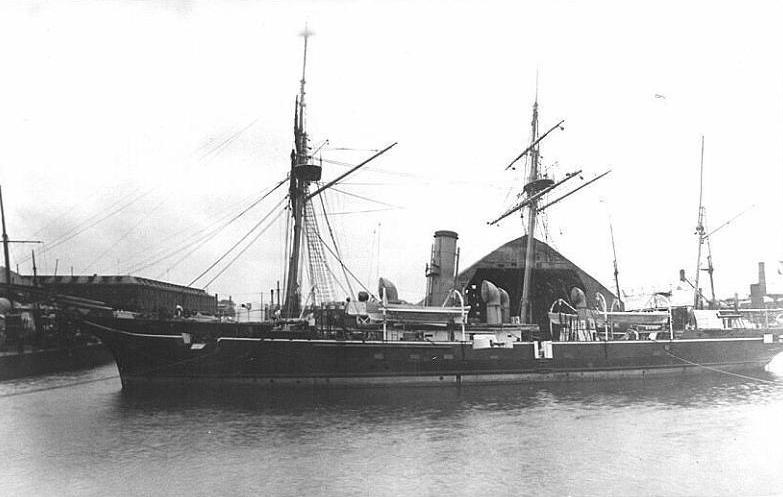
- HMS Rinaldo, a sister-ship of Reindeer

History

United Kingdom
- Name: HMS Reindeer
- Builder: Royal Dockyard, Chatham
- Laid down: May 1860
- Launched: 29 March 1866
- Commissioned: October 1866
- Fate: Sold out of service, 28 August 1873

General characteristics
- Class & type: Camelion-class sloop
- Displacement: 1,365 tons
- Length: 185 ft (56 m)
- Beam: 33 ft (10 m)
- Draught: 14 ft 8 in (4.47 m)
- Propulsion: Screw; 200 hp (150 kW) engine
- Speed: 9 knots (17 km/h; 10 mph)
- Complement: 180
- Armament: 5 × 40 pdr guns; 12 × 32 pdr guns

HMS Reindeer was a Royal Navy wooden-hulled screw-driven sloop of the Camelion class, in service from 1866 to 1876. In 1868 she claimed Caroline Island for the British Crown.
