= Kristin Prim =

American entrepreneur (born 1993)

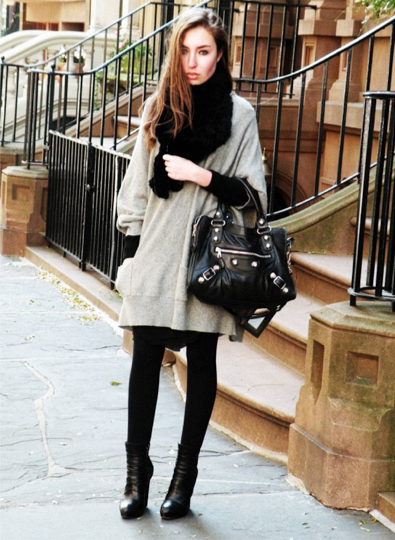
- Kristin Prim in 2012
- Born: December 24, 1993 (age 32); New York City, U.S.
- Education: Parsons School of Design
- Occupations: Designer, Publisher
- Known for: youngest editor-in-chief of an internationally distributed print publication

Kristin Prim (born December 24, 1993) is an American entrepreneur, visual artist, and publisher. In 2008, she made history by becoming the youngest editor-in-chief of an internationally distributed print publication. Prim is currently the founder of Uppercut, as well as the founder and publisher of Noir. Previously, she was the editor in chief and founder of A23, The Provocateur, and Prim Magazine. Prim attended Parsons School of Design, where she majored in Design and Management.

== Media outlets ==
=== Prim Magazine ===
Prim Magazine was founded by Prim in April 2008 at the age of 14, which qualified her as the youngest print publication editor worldwide. Prim Magazine collaborated with designers among the likes of Jeremy Scott, Vena Cava, A.F. Vandevorst, Rad Hourani, and Ohne Titel.

=== A23 ===
In 2015, Prim founded A23, a hardcover art book that commissions nine fine artists to contribute original work to each edition. Its first themed volume, The Mysticism of the Female, included works from artists Mary Beth Edelson, Theo Adams, Luciano Castelli, Heide Hatry, Katarzyna Kozyra, Annegret Soltau, Nil Yalter, Shary Boyle, and Natacha Merritt. A23 is "named after the divination of the Aces, Twos, and Threes of the Minor Arcana" and "highlights the talent of nine fine artists and their 'personal ideologies, experiences, and dogmas in an archival visual manner.'"

=== The Provocateur ===
In early 2016, Prim launched The Provocateur, a digital archive of handwritten letters written by venerated females within the arts to fellow women. The Provocateur is a feminist project in scope, calling on culture's leading women to lend articles of advice to young women. The Provocateur has included collaborators such as Roxane Gay, Sandra Bernhard, King Princess, Linda Perry, Nikki Reed, Alison Mosshart, Janet Mock, Shirley Manson, Floria Sigismondi, Phyllis Nagy, Taylor Momsen, and Amanda Palmer.

The Provocateur was relaunched by Prim in late 2020, boasting a revamped format and a new roster of noteworthy women.

In 2024, The Provocateur was merged with Lenoir to form Noir.

=== Noir ===
In a merger between media outlet The Provocateur and lingerie house Lenoir, Prim founded Noir in late 2024. Noir is an online media outlet and design house that engages in deep, intimate conversations with female cultural icons about womanhood, power, and self-actualization.

Noir has collaborated with Dita Von Teese, Janice Dickinson, Paz de la Huerta, Cosey Fanni Tutti, Omahyra Mota, Margaret Cho, Sandra Bernhard, Miki Berenyi, Gaye Advert, Chelsea Wolfe, Kelli Ali, Roberta Bayley, Cherry Vanilla, Elayne Angel, Sally Potter, Isabel LaRosa, and MØ, among others.

== Uppercut ==
After losing her close friend due to a sexual assault, Prim established Uppercut in 2022. A subscription-based digital fitness platform, Uppercut is "committed to empowering women through strength training and self-defense alongside the greatest female fighters of all time."

== Lenoir ==
In October 2018, Prim founded the luxury lingerie house, Lenoir, to close a gap in the market for lingerie made "for women by women that doesn't lose its sensuality." Its debut was announced by Women's Wear Daily.

== Fine artwork ==
In mid-2013, Prim released a limited collective oeuvre of her fine artwork, varying from photography to paintings and typewritten works. In an interview with Volt, Prim discussed the themes and inspirations behind her work, often involving androgyny, martyrdom, sexuality, gender, and the female form.

== Affiliations ==
Prim has starred in Nike and Diesel campaigns with Sky Ferreira. In May 2011, Prim modeled in Bulgari's Save the Children campaign. In mid-2012, Prim starred in Nicole Miller's Holiday 2012 campaign. Prim has also become the focus of photographs by fashion photographers among the likes of Yvan Rodic of Facehunter, Phil Oh of Street Peeper, Mark "The Cobra Snake" Hunter, and Patrick McMullan. She was recently named a "Vogueista" by Vogue Italia along with Tavi Gevinson.

In April 2008, Prim was first featured by Teen Vogue after being eyed by editor in chief Amy Astley. In December 2009 she appeared in French Glamour. Since then, she has been featured in ELLE Italia, French Glamour, ELLE Korea, The Daily Mail, The Times, The Guardian, Refinery29, Fashion TV, The Huffington Post, Time Out New York, Vogue Italia, Guest of a Guest, i-D, Volt Magazine, Dazed, Garage Magazine, Dolly Magazine, and international Vogues and ELLEs.

Prim became a fixture at New York Fashion Week, sitting front row at shows such as VPL, Nicole Miller, Rad Hourani, Cynthia Steffe, Charlotte Ronson, Moncler, Ohne Titel, Custo Barcelona, Betsey Johnson, Bill Blass, and The Blonds.
