= Rui Jorge (politician) =

Brazilian politician (born 1998)

Member of the Legislative Assembly of Maranhão
- Incumbent
- Assumed office 1 February 2027

Personal details
- Born: 12 July 1998 (age 28)
- Party: Brazilian Democratic Movement
- Parent: Maura Jorge (mother)
- Relatives: Neto Evangelista (brother-in-law)

Rui Fernandes Ribeiro Neto (born 12 July 1998), better known as Rui Jorge, is a Brazilian politician who was elected member of the Legislative Assembly of Maranhão in 2026. He is the son of Maura Jorge and the brother-in-law of Neto Evangelista.
