= Camelion-class sloop =

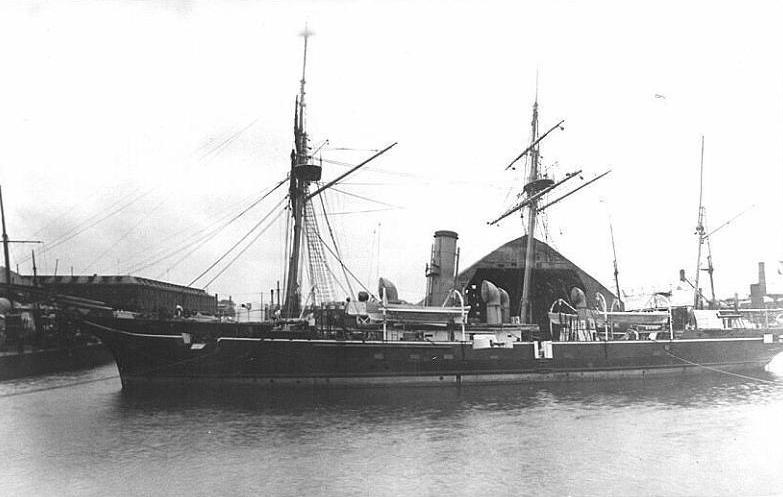
- HMS Rinaldo

Class overview
- Name: Camelion class
- Operators: Royal Navy; Portuguese Navy
- Built: 1860–1866
- Planned: 16
- Completed: 8
- Canceled: 8

General characteristics
- Displacement: 1,365 tons
- Length: 185 ft (56 m)
- Beam: 33 ft (10 m)
- Draught: 14 ft 8 in (4.47 m)
- Installed power: 200 hp (150 kW)
- Propulsion: 2-cylinder horizontal single-expansion steam engine (Note: Except Perseus & Reindeer which had single trunk steam engines.); Single screw
- Sail plan: Barque-rigged
- Speed: 9 knots (17 km/h; 10 mph)
- Complement: 180
- Armament: 5 × 40-pounder breech-loading guns; 12 × 32-pounder muzzle-loading guns (Note: Reindeer was completed with one 110-pounder and five 64-pounders.)

The Camelion class was a class of screw-driven sloops of wood construction, designed by Isaac Watts and operated by the Royal Navy. Eight ships of the class were built from 1858 to 1866 with another eight cancelled. They were initially rated as second-class sloops, but were later reclassified as corvettes.

== Design ==
The class was designed by Issac Watts as second-class sloops of 17 guns, and were a lengthened version of the Cruizer class.

=== Construction ===
Built of a traditional wood structure, they were 185 feet (56 m) long at the gundeck, 33 feet (10 m) in beam and displaced 1,365 tons. A barque rig was fitted to allow easy sail handling with a relatively small crew of 180.

=== Propulsion ===
They were fitted with a two-cylinder horizontal single-expansion steam engine (although Perseus and Reindeer received single trunk steam engines) driving a single screw. These engines generated 200 nominal horsepower, giving a speed of approximately 9 knots (17 km/h; 10 mph).

=== Armament ===
They were armed with five 40-pounder breech-loading guns and twelve 32-pounder muzzle-loading smoothbore guns, although Reindeer was completed with a single 110-pounder and five 64-pounder guns.

== Ships ==
The first two vessels were ordered on 3 April 1854, although neither was laid down for several years. Another three were ordered on 1 April 1857 and a further three on 27 March 1858. The final eight ships were ordered in two batches on 5 March 1860 and 25 March 1861, but were either cancelled, or in the case of Circassian and Trent, completed as ironclad sloops under new names.

Name	Ship Builder	Laid down	Launched	Completed	Fate
Camelion	Deptford Dockyard	8 November 1858	23 February 1860	30 July 1861	Sold for breaking up 1883
Pelican	Pembroke Dockyard	16 June 1859	19 July 1860	25 September 1861	Sold in February 1867 as mercantile Hawk, then resold to the Portuguese Navy and renamed Infanta Dom Henrique
Rinaldo	Portsmouth Dockyard	1 March 1858	26 March 1860	8 June 1861	Sold for breaking up April 1884
Zebra	Deptford Dockyard	4 July 1859	13 November 1860	23 May 1861	Sold in the Far East for breaking up 20 August 1873
Perseus	Pembroke Dockyard	20 July 1860	21 August 1861	September 1862	Became training ship in 1886, renamed Defiance II in March 1904, sold for breaking up 26 June 1931
Chanticleer	Portsmouth Dockyard	2 February 1860	9 February 1861	December 1861	02.10.1862 paddle ship Iona of David Hutcheson & Co wrecked off Gourock following a collision with the newly launched Chanticleer. April 1866, accompanied Lord John Hervey and Henry Strutt, 2nd Baron Belper on a trip to Astakos to pay ransom for their captured friend Mr Coore; 23 January 1875: Sold for breaking up.
Reindeer	Chatham Dockyard	1 May 1860 (Note: Work was suspended in 1862 but subsequently restarted in May 1863)	29 March 1866	October 1866	Sold for breaking up 28 August 1873
Rattler	Deptford Dockyard	28 August 1860	18 March 1862	July 1862	Wrecked off Japan 24 September 1868
Harlequin	Portsmouth Dockyard	13 February 1861			Cancelled 16 December 1864
Tees	Chatham Dockyard	February 1861			Cancelled on 12 December 1863
Sappho	Deptford Dockyard	1 May 1861			Cancelled on 12 December 1863
Trent	Pembroke Dockyard	3 September 1861			Completed as the ironclad sloop HMS Research
Circassian	Deptford Dockyard	5 May 1862			Completed as the ironclad sloop HMS Enterprise
Diligence	Chatham Dockyard	1862			Cancelled on 12 December 1863
Imogene	Portsmouth Dockyard				Cancelled on 12 December 1863
Success	Pembroke Dockyard				Cancelled on 12 December 1863
