= Leandra Medine =

American writer

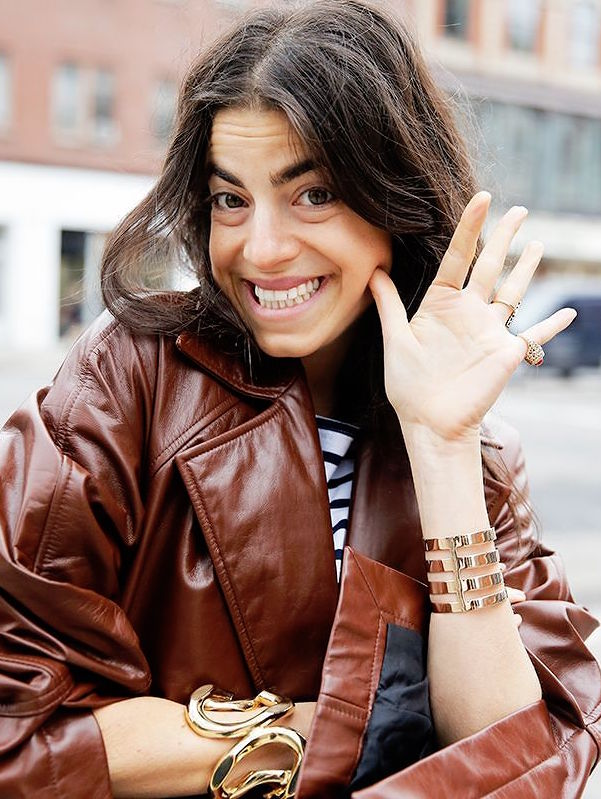
- Born: Leandra Medine; December 20, 1988 (age 37); New York City, U.S.
- Education: The New School (BA)
- Occupation: Fashion blogger
- Years active: 2010–present
- Known for: Founder of Man Repeller
- Notable work: Man Repeller: Seeking Love. Finding Overalls.
- Spouse: Abraham "Abie" J. Cohen (m. 2012)
- Children: 3
- Website: Man Repeller

Leandra Medine Cohen (born December 20, 1988) is an American author, blogger, and humor writer best known for Man Repeller.

== Early life and education ==
Medine was born on December 20, 1988 in Manhattan. Her father, Mois Medine, is of Turkish-Jewish descent, and her mother, Lyora "Laura" Medine, is of Iranian-Jewish descent. She grew up in an Orthodox Jewish household.

Medine attended the Ramaz School in Manhattan. She earned a bachelor's degree in journalism from the New School's Eugene Lang College in May 2011.

== Career ==
=== Early career ===
Medine began writing online in 2009 while a student at The New School. After studying abroad in Paris, she started a blog called Four Months in Paris, later renaming it Boogers + Bagels.

=== Man Repeller ===
Medine started the Man Repeller blog in May 2010. The idea for the blog came during a shopping trip with her friend where they discussed how everything was man-repelling.

A few days after it launched, the blog was featured on the fashion website Refinery29. Medine began collaborating with magazines like Lucky and Harper's Bazaar.

In 2012, Medine appeared in a Forbes 30 Under 30 list. Man Repeller was included in TIME's "25 Best Blogs of 2012", and received "Best Overall Blog" at the 2012 Bloglovin' Awards.

Initially, the blog was written solely by Medine but later grew to include contributions from several writers and editors. In September 2013, Grand Central Publishing published the book Man Repeller: Seeking Love, Finding Overalls.

Medine announced in June 2020 that she would “step back” from her involvement in Man Repeller after allegations of racism. In September 2020, the site was rebranded to Repeller. On October 22, 2020, it was confirmed that Repeller would shut down due to financial constraints.

Medine currently maintains a newsletter entitled "The Cereal Aisle".

=== Brand partnerships ===
Medine has collaborated with designers on limited collections of clothes and accessories, including Gryphon, shoe companies Del Toro and Superga, jewelry line Dannijo, and clothing line PJK.

In 2012, Medine signed with the Creative Artists Agency, an entertainment talent agency headquartered in Los Angeles, California. In 2016, Medine collaborated with Net-a-Porter to launch the shoe line MR by Man Repeller. Later, Medine created her own shoe line Leandra Medine.

On October 29, 2019, Medine launched a partnership collection with Mango.

=== Publications ===
Medine Cohen released her first book, an essay collection, and a memoir titled Man Repeller: Seeking Love, Finding Overalls, in 2013.

== Personal life ==
In December 2011, Medine announced her engagement to Abie J. Cohen, a financial advisor at UBS, whom she had met when she was 17 years old.

Medine and Cohen married in June 2012. They live in the East Village in Manhattan. In a Man Repeller article published in December 2016, Medine revealed she had suffered a miscarriage. On March 1, 2018, Medine gave birth to twin girls, Laura and Madeline. Medine gave birth to her third daughter, Joelle, in August 2024. In October 2026, Medine announced on Instagram that she is pregnant.

== See also ==
- List of Iranian women writers and poets
