= Italian submarine Evangelista Torricelli =

Evangelista Torricelli or just Torricelli was the name of at least four ships of the Italian Navy and may refer to:

- Italian submarine Torricelli (1918), a Micca-class submarine launched in 1918 and discarded in 1930.
- Italian submarine Evangelista Torricelli (1934), an Archimede-class submarine launched in 1934 and transferred to Spain in 1937.
- Italian submarine Torricelli (1939), a Brin-class submarine launched in 1939 and sunk in 1940.
- Italian submarine Evangelista Torricelli (S 512), a Balao-class submarine launched in 1944 as the USS Lizardfish and transferred to Italy in 1960. She was scrapped in 1976.
