= Neto Evangelista =

Brazilian politician (born 1988)

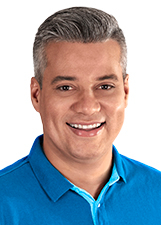
- Evangelista in 2022

Member of the Legislative Assembly of Maranhão
- Incumbent
- Assumed office 1 February 2011

Personal details
- Born: 8 June 1988 (age 38)
- Party: Brazil Union (since 2022)
- Parent: João Evangelista (father)
- Relatives: Rui Jorge (brother-in-law)

José Arimatéa Lima Neto Evangelista (born 8 June 1988) is a Brazilian politician serving as a member of the Legislative Assembly of Maranhão since 2011. He is the son of João Evangelista.
