= HMS Research (1863) =

Sloop of the Royal Navy

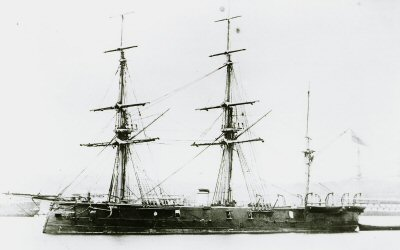
- Research in 1864

History

United Kingdom
- Name: HMS Research
- Builder: Pembroke Dockyard
- Cost: £71,287 (Note: A total cost accounting for inflation of approximately £7,744,000 in today's money.)
- Laid down: 3 September 1861
- Launched: 15 August 1863
- Completed: 6 April 1864
- Commissioned: 6 April 1864
- Fate: Laid up 1878; Sold for breaking, 1884

General characteristics as originally designed
- Type: Wooden Camelion-class sloop
- Displacement: 1,200 tons
- Length: 185 ft (56 m)
- Beam: 33 ft 2 in (10.11 m)
- Draught: 13 ft (4.0 m) light, 15 ft (4.6 m) deep load

General characteristics after conversion
- Type: Ironclad sloop
- Displacement: 1,743 tons
- Tons burthen: 1,253 bm
- Length: 195 ft (59 m) pp
- Beam: 38 ft 6 in (11.73 m)
- Draught: 13 ft (4.0 m) light, 16 ft 4 in (4.98 m) deep load
- Installed power: 200 nominal horsepower; 1,040 indicated horsepower (780 kW)
- Propulsion: Boulton and Watt horizontal single-expansion direct-acting steam engine; 2 × tubular boilers; 1 × hoisting 12-foot (4 m) screw
- Sail plan: Barque rig, sail area 18,250 sq ft (1,695 m^{2})
- Speed: 10.3 knots (19 km/h) under power; 6 knots (11 km/h), best sailing speed
- Complement: 150
- Armament: 1864: 4 × 100-pounder smoothbore guns; 1870: 4 × 7-inch (180-mm) 6½-ton muzzle-loading rifles
- Armour: 4.5 inch belt and battery; 4.5 inch bulkheads

HMS Research was a small ironclad warship, converted from a wooden-hulled sloop and intended as an experimental platform in which to try out new concepts in armament and in armour. She was launched in 1863, laid up in 1878 and sold for breaking in 1884, having displayed serious limitations as a warship.

== Background ==
In the period from 1860 to 1865 the Board of Admiralty were seriously concerned at the speed with which France was producing ironclad warships. One of the steps taken to counter this perceived threat was the conversion of partially built British wooden ships into ironclads, including such large ships as the Prince Consort-class ironclads.

== Design ==
=== Conversion ===
The 17-gun sloop Trent had been ordered in November 1860 as one of the Camelion-class. She was selected for conversion to an ironclad, and her name was changed to Research. Although she had been building for a year, work was not far advanced, and the necessary changes to her length and beam could easily be made. A new design by the Royal Navy Chief Constructor, Sir Edward Reed, saw her sloop ends replaced by an oval stern and a ram bow, and the draught altered to give her a trim of 3 1/2 feet (1.1 m) by the stern.

=== Armament ===
Her armament was carried in a midships armoured compartment which, when used in subsequent designs, became known as a box battery. The designed armament of seventeen guns was discarded, and the offensive power of the ship was concentrated into four 100-pounder Somerset smoothbore cannon, which were at the time the most powerful guns afloat. While these guns were certainly much more effective against armour than smaller pieces, whether a two-gun broadside would have prevailed against more generously armed ironclads is open to question.

For the first time, in this ship, a degree of axial fire was possible from broadside guns. The hull sides were recessed at either end of the battery, and gunports were constructed facing fore and aft to which the guns could be moved. Moving the guns in anything other than calm weather was a hazardous procedure.

The Somerset smoothbore cannon were replaced in 1870 with four 7-inch (180-mm) 6½-ton muzzle-loading rifles, largely because of the difficulty in working and controlling the guns.

=== Armour ===
Once completed as an ironclad, she featured a full-length 4 1/2-inch (11 cm) armour belt to a depth of 10 feet (3.0 m). An armoured box battery was provided on the main deck with the same thickness of armour. The iron armour was backed by 19 1/2 inches (50 cm) of teak.

=== Propulsion ===
Research was fitted with a 2-cylinder Boulton and Watt horizontal single-expansion direct-acting steam engine of 200 nominal horsepower. Steam was provided by two tubular boilers, and the screw, which was 12 feet (4 m) in diameter, could be hoisted clear of the water for better performance under sail. The total power of 937 indicated horsepower (699 kW) (after a refit in 1869 this was increased to 1,040 ihp) was sufficient to propel her at just over 10 knots (19 km/h). She carried 130 tons of coal.

== Construction ==
Having been laid down on 3 September 1861, approval was given for her conversion to an ironclad on 1 September 1862. She was launched from Pembroke Dockyard on 15 August 1863 and commissioned on 6 April 1864.

== Assessment ==
Research rolled excessively, and was normally retained in harbour during the winter months. Although Edward Reed, her designer, had expected great things of her, the Standard of 27 October 1865 said "probably the very worst vessel, both as a fighting machine and a sea-boat, that ever yet went out of a dockyard of any nation pretending to a maritime reputation".

== Service ==
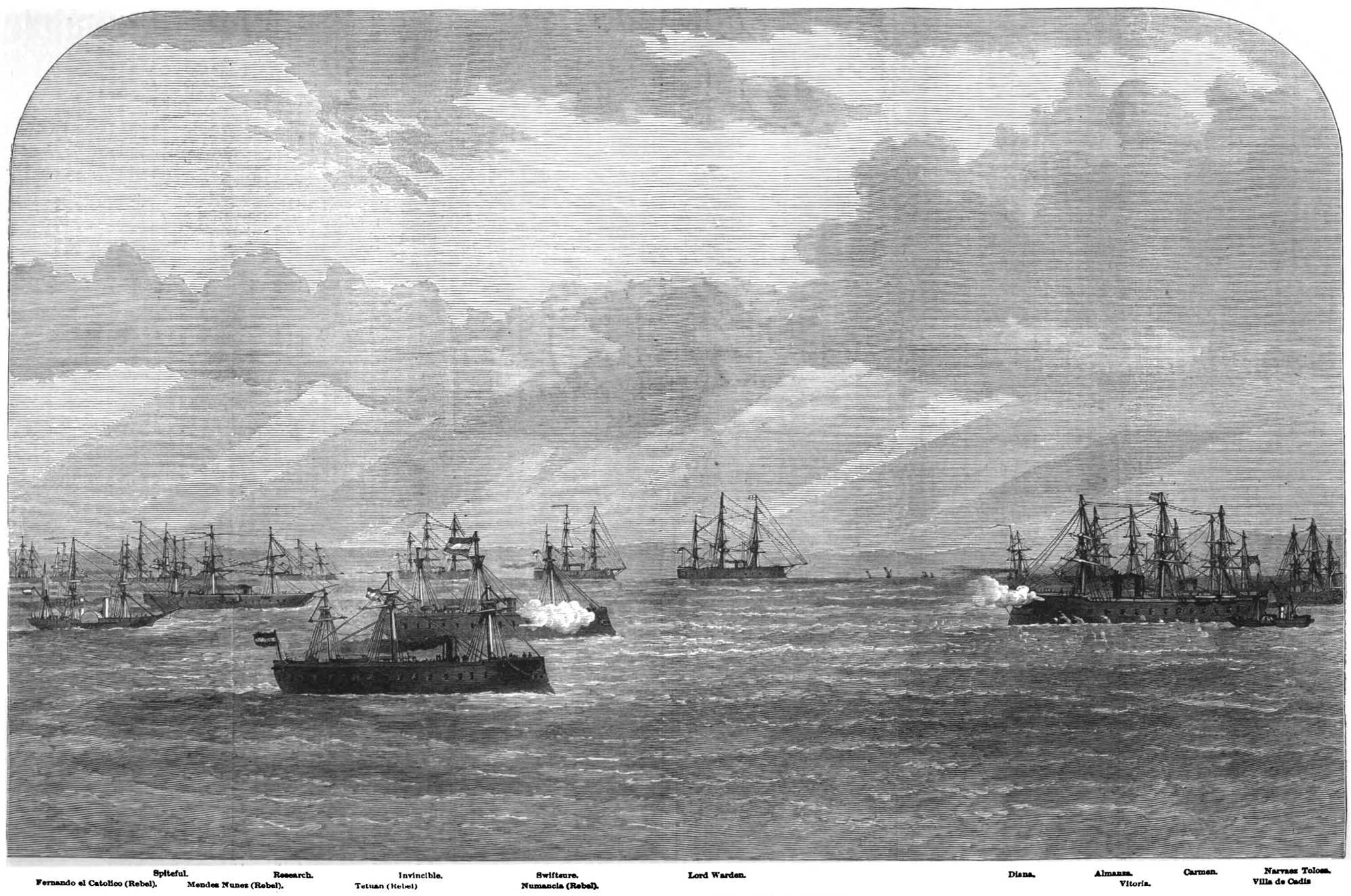
At the Battle of Escombrera in 1873

She served in the Channel Fleet from 1864 to 1866, and in the Mediterranean from 1871 to 1878.

On 1 December 1865, she ran aground off Harrington Point, County Waterford. She was refloated the next day and sailed for Portsmouth, Hampshire. On 1 January 1868, while on patrol duties at the south coast of Ireland, she grounded near Cork Harbour while giving chase to an American ship, Alaska. During the subsequent court martial it was demonstrated that the ship had not in fact grounded on Daunt Rock, but instead on the wreckage of the British steamship City of New York, which had wrecked near the rock a year previously, and the ship's officers were exonerated. Repairs cost £293.

On 1 September 1873 at Cartagena, Research took part in the Battle of Escombrera Bay as part of a British Squadron, where they attacked and removed the rebel Spanish warships Vitoria and Almansa from the Bay. This was the only time in her short career Research saw action.

== Fate ==
She was laid up in 1878 and sold for breaking in 1884.

== Bibliography ==
- Ballard, G. A. (1980). The Black Battlefleet. Naval Institute Press. ISBN 0-87021-924-3.
- Friedman, Norman (2018). British Battleships of the Victorian Era. Naval Institute Press. ISBN 978-1-68247-329-0.
- Jones, Colin (1996). "Entente Cordiale, 1865". In McLean, David & Preston, Antony (eds.). Warship 1996. London: Conway Maritime Press. ISBN 0-85177-685-X.
- Lyon, David & Winfield, Rif (2004). The Sail and Steam Navy List: All the Ships of the Royal Navy 1815–1889. Chatham Publishing. ISBN 978-1-86176-032-6. OCLC 52620555.
- Parkes, Oscar (1990) [1966]. British Battleships, Warrior 1860 to Vanguard 1950: A History of Design, Construction, and Armament (New & rev. ed.). Naval Institute Press. ISBN 1-55750-075-4.
- Roberts, John (1979). "Great Britain (including Empire Forces)". In Chesneau, Roger & Kolesnik, Eugene M. (eds.). Conway's All the World's Fighting Ships 1860–1905. New York: Mayflower Books. pp. 1–113. ISBN 0-8317-0302-4.
- "Shipwrecks of Cork Harbour". 2 February 2010.
