= Somerset cannon =

The Somerset cannon was a British cannon designed within the Admiralty and manufactured by Armstrong's.

Its genesis was the unexpected failure of the Armstrong breech-loading rifles recently developed and installed on Royal Navy ships. The Somerset was a 6.5 ton 9.2 in (23 cm) calibre smoothbore muzzle-loader, firing a 100 lb (45 kg) shot. A steel shot from a Somerset cannon could penetrate 5.5 in (14 cm) of armour at 800 yd (0.73 km).

Providing a mounting which could reliably be worked at sea proved difficult for a piece of this size. Traditional truck carriages were inadequate; historical research revealed that a carriage which was suitable had been suggested by Captain Sir Thomas Hardy (Nelson's Flag Captain) many years before. In this system the gun-carriage remained stationary, and the recoil of the gun was absorbed by a system of sliding friction blocks attached to the carriage and to the gun.

The gun was issued for service, and was mounted in HM Ships Achilles, Research, Favorite and Enterprise, but its performance was so poor, largely due to difficulties with the carriage in absorbing the recoil, that it was withdrawn from service.
