= Natacha Merritt =

American photographer (born 1977)

- Born: 1977 (age 48–49); San Francisco, USA
- Education: San Francisco State University
- Known for: Photography, Writing, Virtual Reality
- Style: Erotica
- Website: natacha-merritt.fr

Natacha Merritt (born 1977) is an American photographer, artist and biologist. Her 2000 book Digital Diaries was published by Taschen and was the first digital photography book ever published. She has been profiled in Rolling Stone. Merritt has been called a cheap self-promoter, a ground-breaker, and the contemporary counterpart of Anaïs Nin. She cataloged her sexual history on the internet through explicit photographs and drew the attention of photographer Eric Kroll, leading to the release of her photos as Digital Diaries.

Merritt was a guest speaker at the Ars Electronica Festival in Austria and in Melbourne at the AGIdeas 2002 conference. In 2003 she was one of the creators of Zumanity for Cirque du Soleil. In 2008 she sold the rights for an Insect Circus to Cirque du Soleil. The show became Ovo.

Merritt has been compared to Cindy Sherman and Claude Cahun in how she has broken photographic ground in self-portraiture by redefining the boundaries of artistic photography. Her work has been described as "a distinct female voice that takes candid self-revelation to new heights of wonderful indecency".

In Merritt's 2012 book Sexual Selection, she compares and contrasts the sexual intricacies of plants and insects with her own sexuality. She returned to higher education to study evolutionary biology, noting "The leap makes sense when you are passionate about sex. All roads lead to evolutionary biology, speciation and genetics." Sexual Selection has been called a work of art that "offer insight into universal sexuality and broaden the viewer’s sense of beauty and understanding of sexual behavior".

Merritt has continued her directorial career as the creative director for a live erotic interactive event in Beverly Hills. The event was critically acclaimed. When asked by the Los Angeles Times what sort of talent she looked for in erotic performers, she said "My ideal performer was one woman who said 'I want to perform at Sanctum, become a politician and then get outed in a sex scandal so I can point out the hypocrisy,'" Merritt said. "I was like, 'You're hired.'"

Merritt has been developing virtual reality content since late 2014

== Books ==
- Sexual Selection 2012 with introduction by Richard Prince
- Digital Diaries 2000

== Projection designer ==
In 2003 Merritt was as a creator and projection designer for Cirque du Soleil's erotic show Zumanity.
