= HMS Bristol (1861) =

Frigate of the Royal Navy

History

United Kingdom
- Name: Bristol
- Namesake: Bristol
- Ordered: 9 April 1856
- Builder: Woolwich Dockyard
- Laid down: 16 September 1859
- Launched: 12 February 1861
- Completed: October 1865
- Fate: Sold for scrap, July 1883

General characteristics
- Class & type: Bristol-class frigate
- Displacement: 4,020 long tons (4,080 t)
- Tons burthen: 3,027 26/94 bm
- Length: 250 ft (76.2 m)
- Beam: 52 ft (15.8 m)
- Draught: 18 ft 10 in (5.7 m)
- Installed power: 4 boilers; 2,088 ihp (1,557 kW)
- Propulsion: 1 shaft, 1 Steam engine
- Speed: 11 knots (20 km/h; 13 mph)
- Complement: 550–600
- Armament: Thirty 8-inch (203 mm) muzzle-loading smoothbore guns; Twenty 32-pounder muzzle-loading smoothbore guns; One 68-pounder muzzle-loading smoothbore gun

HMS Bristol was the name ship of her class of wooden screw frigates built for the Royal Navy during the 1860s.

== Design and description ==
Bristol was 250 feet (76.2 m) long between perpendiculars and 214 feet 7 inches (65.4 m) at the keel. She had a beam of 52 feet (15.8 m), a draught of 18 feet 10 inches (5.7 m) at deep load and a depth of hold of 18 feet 8 inches (5.7 m). The ship's tonnage was 3,027 26/94 tons burthen and Bristol displaced 4,023 long tons (4,088 t). The ship had a crew of 550 officers and ratings.

She had a horizontal, two-cylinder, single-expansion steam engine, built by Robert Napier and Sons, that drove a single propeller shaft using steam that was provided by four boilers. The engine produced 2,088 indicated horsepower (1,557 kW) which gave the ship a maximum speed of 11.8 knots (21.9 km/h; 13.6 mph) under steam. To improve her sailing qualities, the propeller could be hoisted into the hull.

Bristol was initially equipped with thirty ML eight-inch (203 mm) smoothbore muzzle-loading guns (SBML) of 65 hundredweight on her gundeck. These guns were designed specifically to fire the latest exploding shells, unlike the traditional solid cannonballs. On her upper deck were twenty 32-pounder SBML guns that weighed 56 hundredweight and a single 68-pounder SBML gun on a pivot mount. In January 1868, the ship was rearmed with 10 eight-inch shell guns and a dozen rifled, muzzle-loading 64-pounder guns on the gundeck. Four more 64-pounders were mounted on the upper deck.

== Construction and career ==
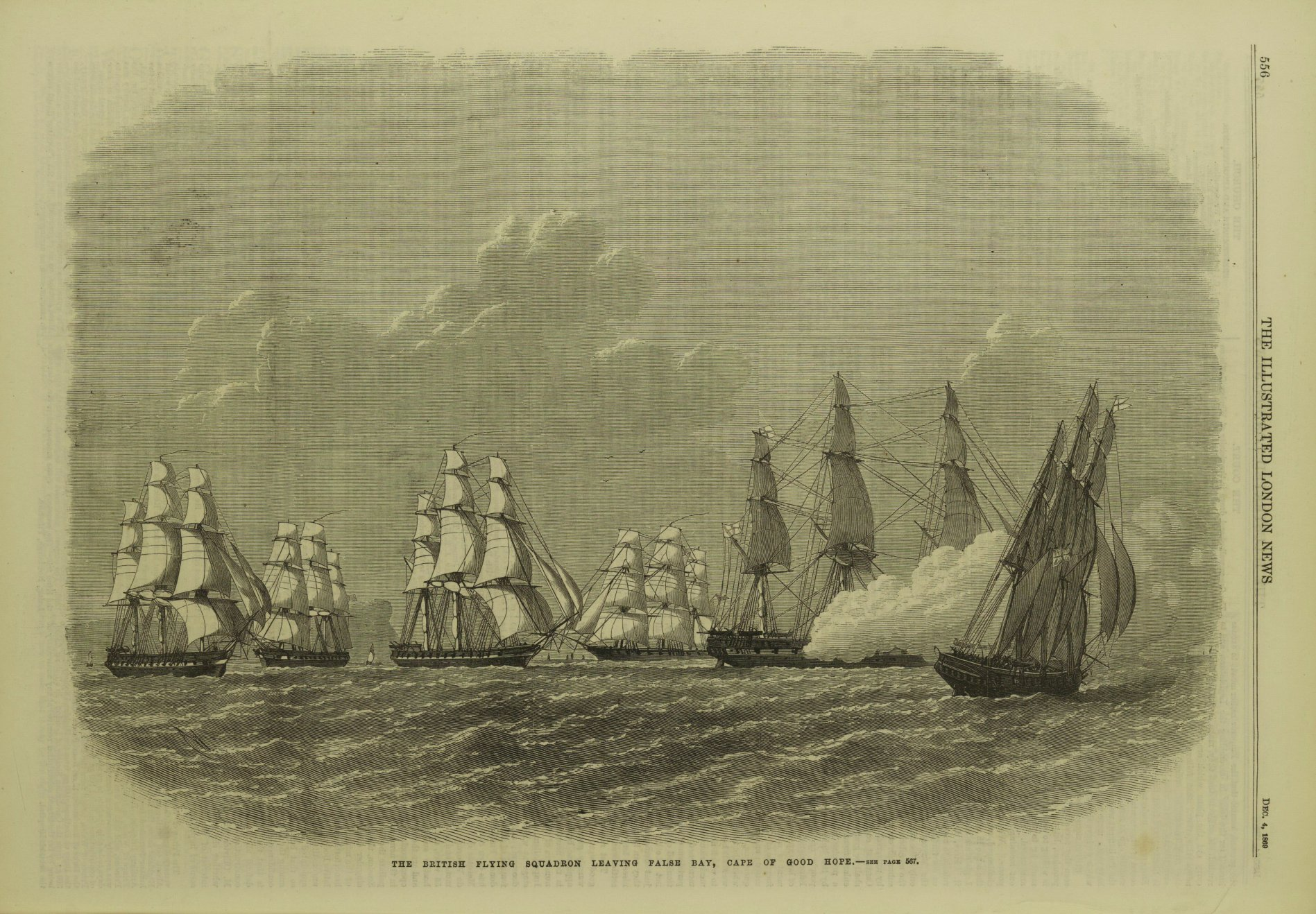
Bristol and the British Flying Squadron leaving False Bay, Cape of Good Hope on 18 October 1869

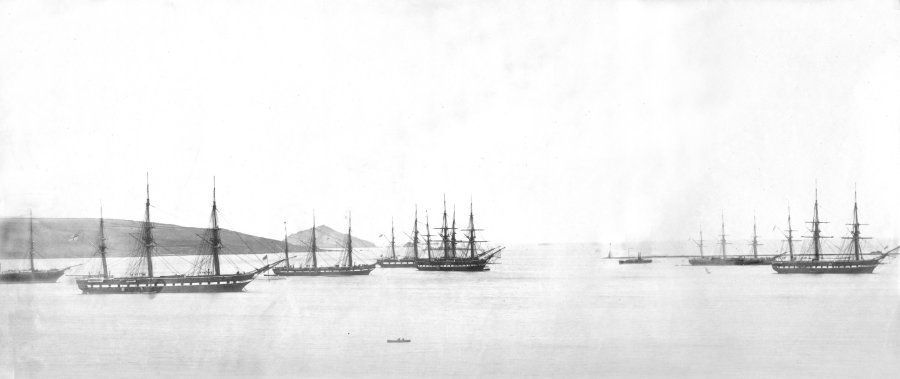
The Flying Squadron lying at anchor

Bristol, named after the city of Bristol, was ordered on 9 April 1856 as part of the 1856 Naval Programme. As the design was revised several times, she was not laid down at Woolwich Dockyard until 16 September 1859. The ship was launched on 12 February 1861, but she was not commissioned until October 1865. On 10 November, she ran aground off the Nore during her sea trials. She was refloated and sailed for Portsmouth, Hampshire. On 11 December 1869, she ran aground. Repairs cost £2,197. Her pilot was found at fault, and was stripped of his licence to pilot men-of-war.

== Notes ==
- "Various British Screw Frigates". Warship International. V (4): 323. 1968.
- Roberts, John (1979). "Great Britain (including Empire Forces)". In Chesneau, Roger & Kolesnik, Eugene M. (eds.). Conway's All the World's Fighting Ships 1860–1905. Mayflower Books. pp. 1–113. ISBN 0-8317-0302-4.
- Winfield, Rif (2014). British Warships in the Age of Sail, 1817-1863: Design, Construction, Careers and Fates. Barnsley, UK: Seaforth Publishing. ISBN 978-1-84832-169-4.
