= Evangelisti =

Evangelisti is a surname, and may refer to:

- Alessandro Evangelisti (born 1981), Italian footballer
- Franca Evangelisti (born 1935), Italian lyricist
- Franco Evangelisti (composer) (1926–1980), Italian composer
- Franco Evangelisti (politician), (1923–1993) Italian politician
- Giovanni Evangelisti (born 1961), Italian long jumper
- Mattia Evangelisti, (born 1991), Italian footballer
- Valerio Evangelisti (1952–2022), Italian writer of science fiction, fantasy and horror
