= Evangelista Martinotti =

Italian painter

Evangelista Martinotti (1634–1694) was an Italian painter of the Baroque period.

He was born in Monferrato, Piedmont. Martinotti was a pupil of Salvator Rosa, and often painted landscapes. His brother Francesco (1636–1374), a figure painter, also trained with Rosa.
