= Fashionista =

Fashionistas may refer to:

- Fashionistas (film), a 2002 American pornographic film
- Fashionistas, a 2004-2008 live show produced by John Stagliano at the Harmon Theater (aka Krave Nightclub) at the Mandalay Bay casino, Las Vegas Strip, based on the 2002 American pornographic film
- Fashionistas, a modern line of Barbie-brand dolls with more body-shape options (curvy, petite, and tall) than the originals
- The Fashionistas, minor villains in the Kim Possible animated TV series

Fashionista may refer to:

- Fashionista, an avid leader and follower of fashion
- Fashionista (website), a website about fashion
- Fashionista (TV series), an Australian TV series
- "Fashionista", a song by Namie Amuro from Genic
- "Fashionista", a song by Monice
- "Fashionista", a song by Chai from Punk

== See also ==
- Fashion influencer
- Fashion victim
- Fashion activism
