= RBL 7-inch Armstrong gun =

1861 British coast defence gun

Ordnance RBL 7-inch gun
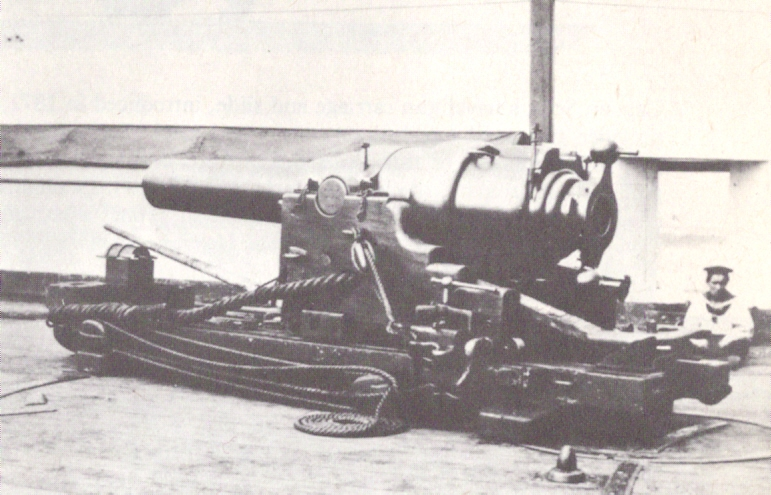
- A gun on a wooden slide carriage in the 19th century.
- Type: Naval gun; Coast defence gun
- Place of origin: United Kingdom

Service history
- In service: 1861–190?
- Used by: United Kingdom
- Wars: New Zealand Wars; Bombardment of Kagoshima; Bombardment of Shimonoseki

Production history
- Designer: W. G. Armstrong Co.
- Manufacturer: W. G. Armstrong Co.; Royal Gun Factory
- Unit cost: £425–£650 (equivalent to £47000–£72000 in 2013)
- Produced: 1859–1864
- No. built: 959
- Variants: 82cwt, 72cwt

Specifications
- Barrel length: 99.5 inches (2.527 m) bore (14.21 calibres)
- Shell: 90 to 109 pounds (40 to 50 kg)
- Calibre: 7-inch (177.8 mm)
- Breech: Armstrong screw with vertical sliding vent-piece (block)
- Muzzle velocity: 1,100 feet per second (340 m/s)
- Maximum firing range: 3,500 yards (3,200 m)

The Armstrong RBL 7-inch gun, also known as the 110-pounder, was a heavy caliber Armstrong gun, an early type of rifled breechloader.

William Armstrong's innovative combination of a rifled built-up gun with breechloading had proven suitable for small cannon. When it was applied to a 7-inch gun, it proved that the pressure caused by the explosive charge that was required to propel a 110-pound shot was too much for his breechloading system.

== Description ==
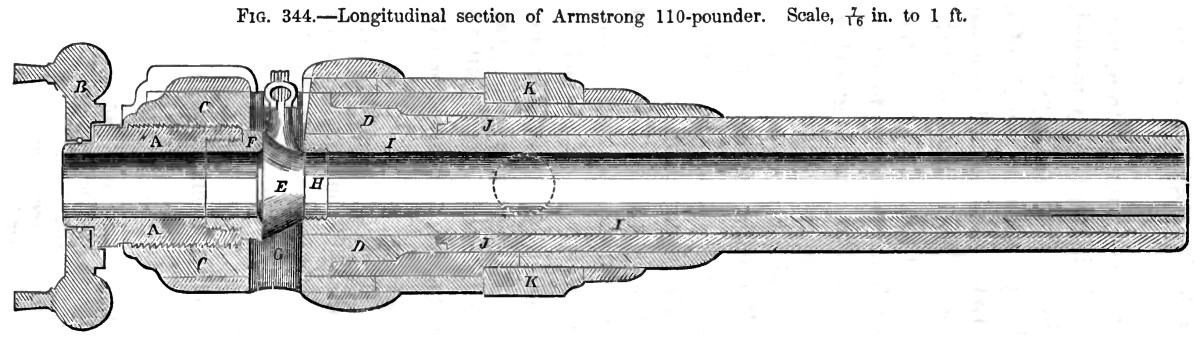
82 cwt gun construction

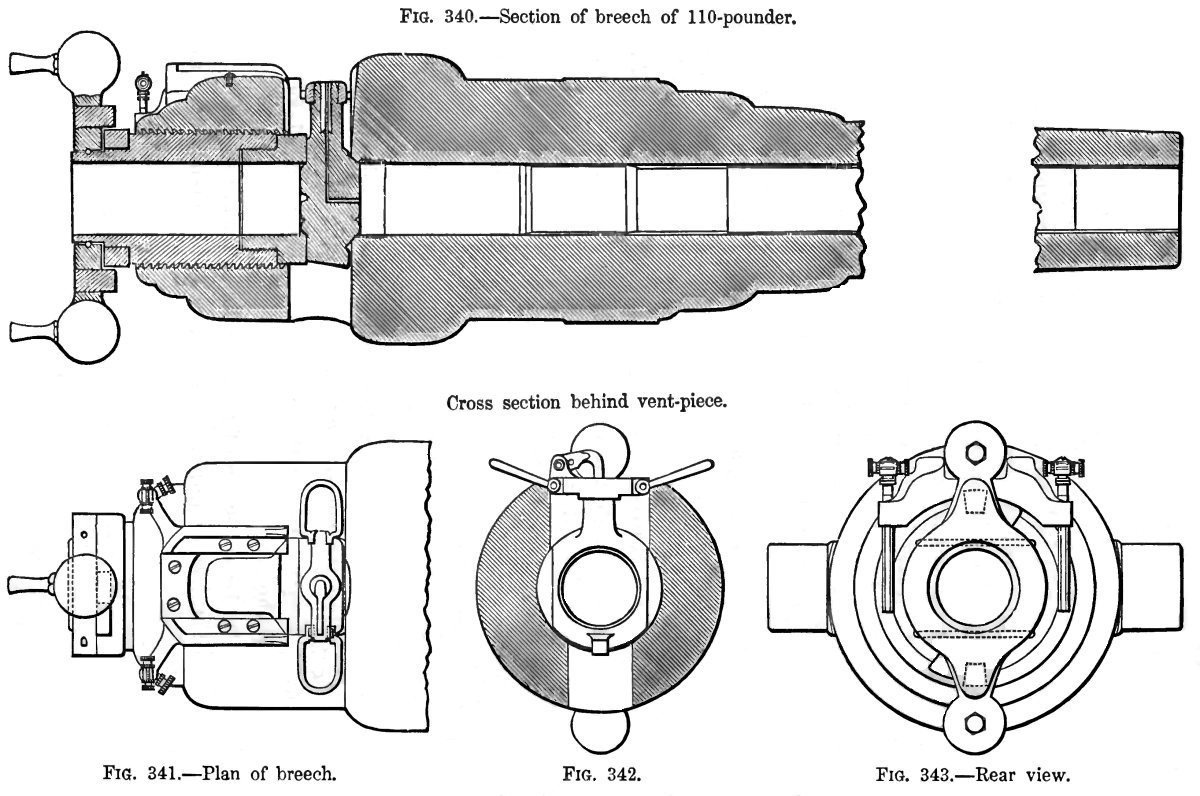
Breech mechanism

The Armstrong "screw" breech mechanism used a heavy block inserted in a vertical slot in the barrel behind the chamber, with a large hollow screw behind it which was manually screwed tight against the block after loading. A metal cup on the front of the block, together with the pressure of the screw behind it, provided "obturation" and sealed the breech to prevent escape of gasses rearward on firing. The sliding-block was known as the "vent-piece", as the vent tube was inserted through it to fire the gun. In modern terms it was a vertical sliding-block.

To load the gun, the vent-piece was raised, the shell was inserted through the hollow screw and rammed home into the bore, and the powder cartridge was likewise inserted through the screw into the chamber. The vent-piece was lowered, the screw was tightened, a tube was inserted in the top of the vent-piece, and the gun was fired.

Shells had a thin lead coating which made them fractionally larger than the gun's bore, and which engaged with the gun's rifling grooves to impart spin to the shell. This spin, together with the elimination of windage as a result of the tight fit, enabled the gun to achieve greater range and accuracy than existing smoothbore muzzle-loaders with a smaller powder charge.

On top of each powder cartridge was a "lubricator" consisting of tallow and linseed oil between two tin plates, backed by a felt wad coated with beeswax and finally by millboard. The lubricator followed the shell down the bore, the lubricant was squeezed out between the tin plates and the wad behind it cleaned out any lead deposits left from the shell coating, leaving the bore clean for the next round.

== History ==
This method had already proved successful in the much smaller RBL 12 pounder 8 cwt field gun, and the British Government requested it be implemented for heavy guns despite Armstrong's protests that the mechanism was unsuited to heavy guns:

The threatening aspects of the continent required that large rifled guns should be procured for naval and siege purposes. I was therefore called upon to produce 40-pounders and 100-pounders without having had an opportunity of testing the patterns by previous trials, though I had stated in my original report that I apprehended that the application of breech-loading to large guns would involve an application of parts which would be inconveniently heavy to handle ... I was at first in hopes that the same material which had been used and found to be sufficient for the 40-pounder, would be found equally suitable for the 100-pounder; but that turns out not to be the case. The vent-piece for the 100-pounder continues still to be a difficulty.

— Sir W. Armstrong to the Select Committee on Ordnance in 1863

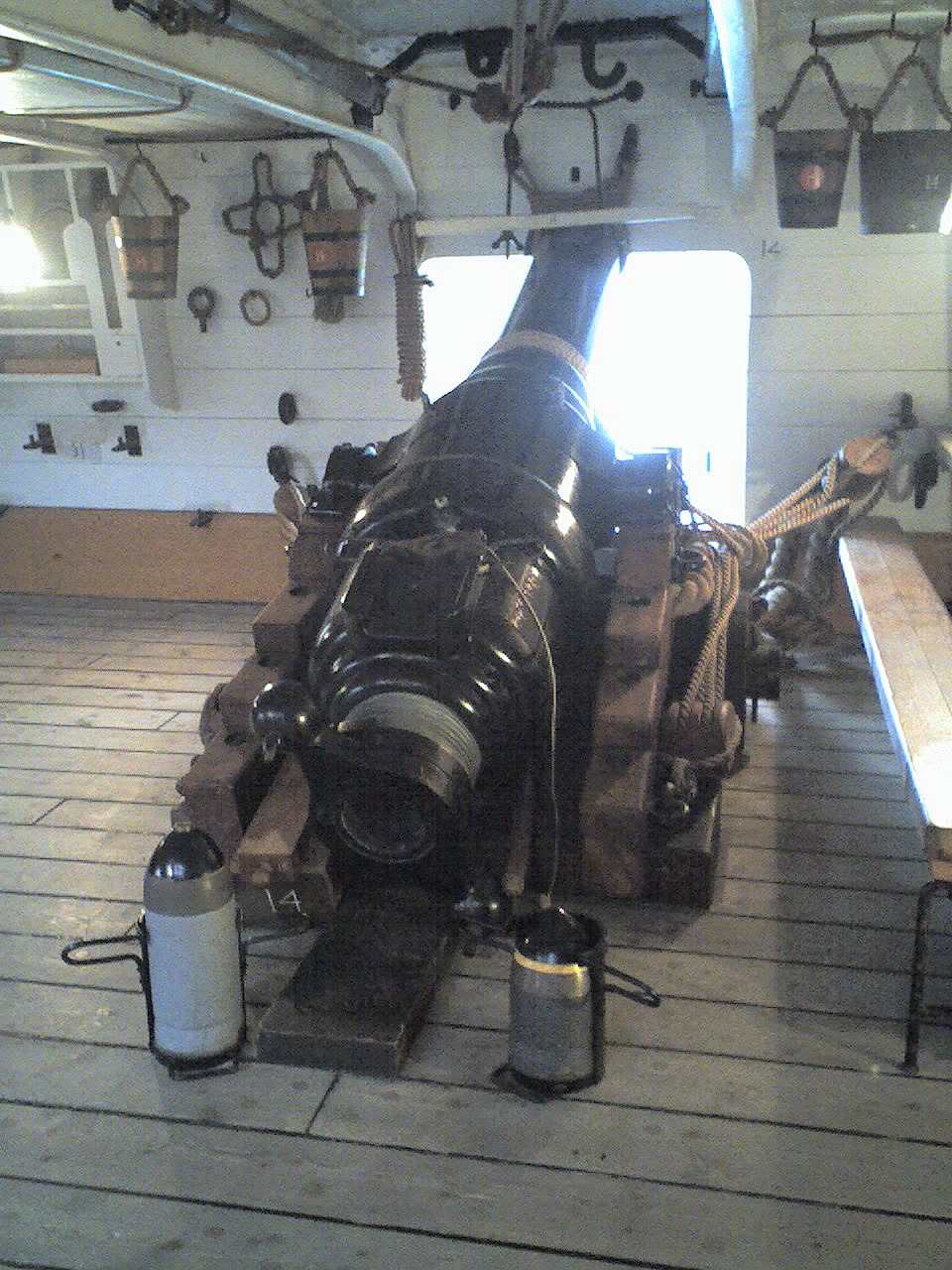
A fibreglass replica aboard the museum ship HMS Warrior at Portsmouth, United Kingdom. Shells for the gun are on deck in the foreground.

The gun as first made weighed 72 cwt (8,064 lb) but the heavier 82 cwt (9,184 lb) version, incorporating a strengthening coil over the powder chamber, was the first to enter service in 1861. It was intended to replace the smoothbore muzzle-loading 68-pounder gun, and was intended to be Britain's first modern rifled breech-loading naval gun. The lighter 72 cwt version eventually entered service in 1863 for land use only.

The British government's Select Committee on Ordnance held lengthy hearings in 1862 and 1863 on the relative merits of the Armstrong breechloaders compared to other breechloaders and muzzle-loaders. It finally announced:

... the preponderance of opinion seems to be against any breech-loading systems for the larger guns

It was considered that with a maximum gunpowder propellant charge of only 12 pounds (soon reduced to 11 lb for the 82 cwt gun and 10 lb for the 72 cwt gun) the gun was incapable of a high enough muzzle velocity to penetrate the armour of enemy ships:

These guns can only be fired with comparatively small charges, and therefore their projectiles would do no injury to ironclad vessels, but their shells would no doubt be most destructive to wooden ships.

— Lieutenant-Colonel C. H. Owen, Royal Artillery, reflecting the establishment opinion in 1873.

Critics also considered that the manual labour needed to raise the heavy (136 lb) vent piece out of the breech before reloading was an unnecessary combat impediment. Another objection raised was that obturation (i.e. sealing of the breech on firing) depended on how tightly the gunners turned the breech screw after loading:

My objection has been to the Armstrong breech-loader. My objection to that is, that the breech-plug is only a valve; and the first principle of every valve, whether the vessel contain water or oil, or gas, is that the pressure of that fluid should press the valve tighter. Now Sir William Armstrong's breech-loader is on a diametrically opposite system; nothing there confines the gas but the actual amount of labour expended in the screwing up of the breech. If the gas is stronger than the man, aided by the screw, the gas will escape ...

— Captain Blakely to the Select Committee on Ordnance

As these limitations were imposed by the current Armstrong breechloading design, and as no other suitable breechloading mechanism was available, production of the 110-pounder was discontinued in 1864 and Britain reverted to muzzle-loading heavy guns. The remaining guns were moved to the role of fortress artillery where they remained in post for much of the Victorian era.

The abandonment of the Armstrong breech-loading design led Britain to begin a major program of building rifled muzzle-loaders to equip its fleet. The Armstrong 110-pound gun was succeeded by various RML 7 and 8-inch guns. 7-inch Armstrong breech-loaders under construction at the time of cancellation were completed as RML 64-pounder muzzle-loaders. However, the gun construction method developed by Armstrong for breech-loaders, of a wrought-iron "A" tube surrounded by wrought-iron coils, was considered sound and was retained for the first generation of new rifled muzzle-loaders in the mid-1860s.

When Britain returned to breech-loaders in 1880 it used the Elswick cup and the French De Bange obturation systems, both of which used the power of the gun's firing to achieve obturation rather than manual labour.

== Use in action ==
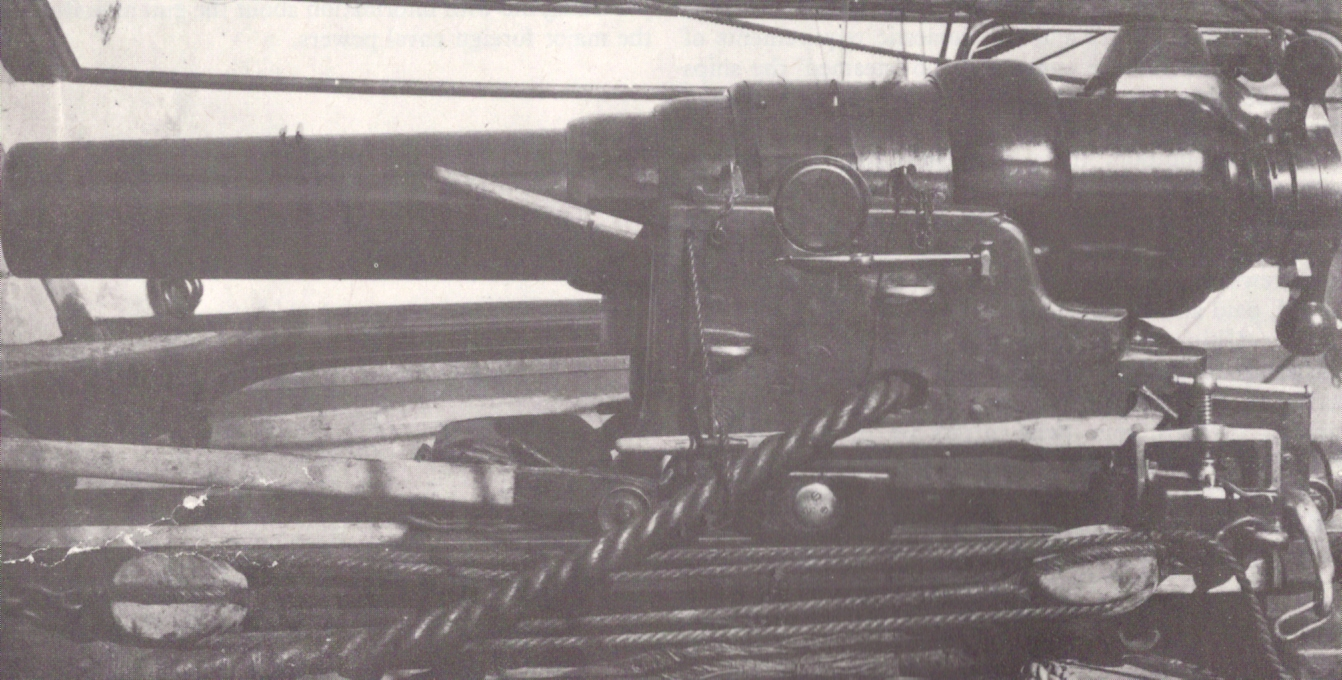
An Armstrong 7-inch (178 mm) rifled breechloader in the 19th century.

The gun was used extensively by Royal Navy ships against land fortifications in the Bombardment of Kagoshima and Bombardment of Shimonoseki in 1863 and 1864. We have two descriptions of the same incident aboard HMS Euryalus at the Bombardment of Kagoshima in August 1863:

We had on our main-deck 32-pr. 56 cwt. muzzle-loaders; and they, of course, gave no trouble ... in the forecastle we had a 7-in. B.L. 110-pr. Armstrong. Whether the men in the heat of the action became hurried I cannot say; but certain it is that the breech piece of this gun blew out with tremendous effect, the concussion knocking down the whole gun's crew, and apparently paralysing the men, until Webster, captain of the forecastle and of the gun, roused them by shouting: 'Well; is there ere a b— of you will go and get the spare vent piece?'

— Letter from an officer of HMS Euryalus to historian William Laird Clowes many years after the event.

My opinion, and also that of the gunnery lieutenant, is that for long range they [Armstrong guns], are most successful. The 100-pounder (sic) as a pivot gun is superior to the 95 cwt. solid 8-inch gun; but as broadside guns between decks we do not like them; the smoke is too great. Rear choke carriages with such heavy guns are very slow in working and the decks dreadfully cut up. The common shell is one of its great efficiencies, the bursting charge is so great. At Kagosima one vent-piece of the pivot-gun broke and a piece went up to foreyard, but no one was hurt, and it was the fault of the captain of the gun not putting the tin cap in. If the gun is understood and worked properly, it is very successful.

— An officer from HMS Euryalus, published in The Times on 25 April 1864.

The guns, while functioning well when correctly handled, were hence seen to be difficult and potentially dangerous to use under the stress of combat.

During the New Zealand Wars, the gun was used in the bombardment of the Maori fortifications at Gate Pa on 29 April 1864. Although subjected to one of the fiercest bombardments of the wars, the Maori defenders were protected by anti-artillery bunkers and went on to repel the British force, inflicting heavy casualties.

== Ammunition ==
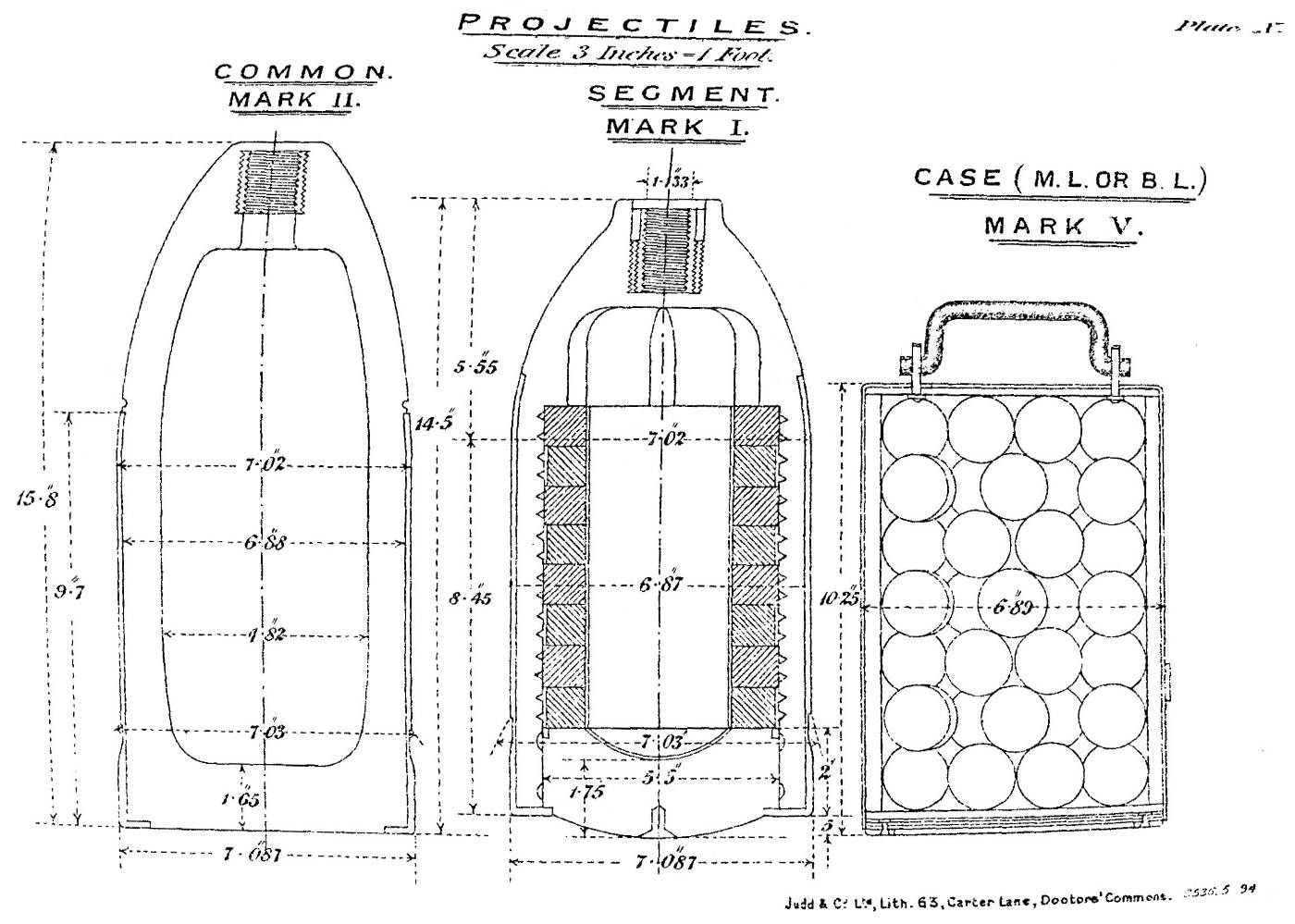
Diagrams showing projectiles Mark II common shell, Mark I segment shell, Mark V case shot

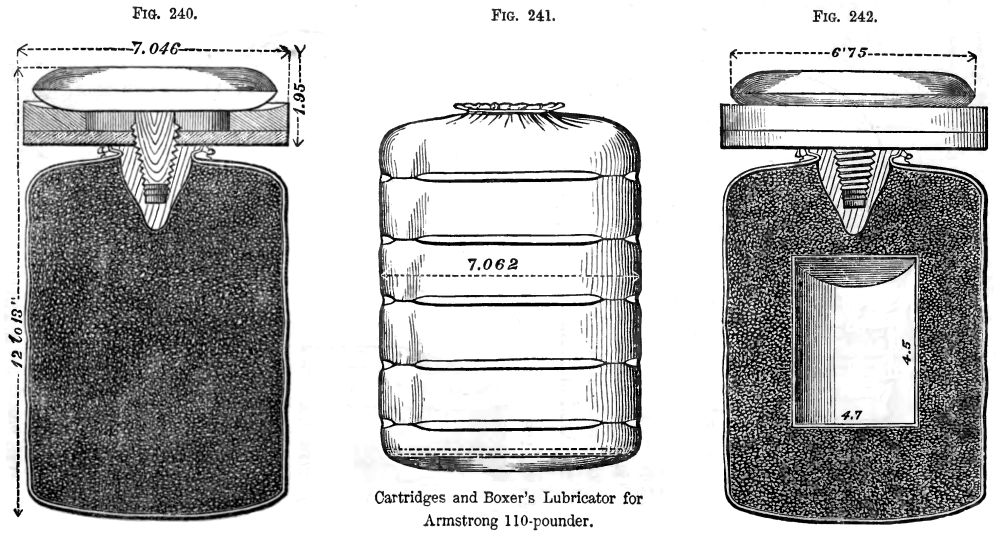
Powder cartridge with lubricator on top

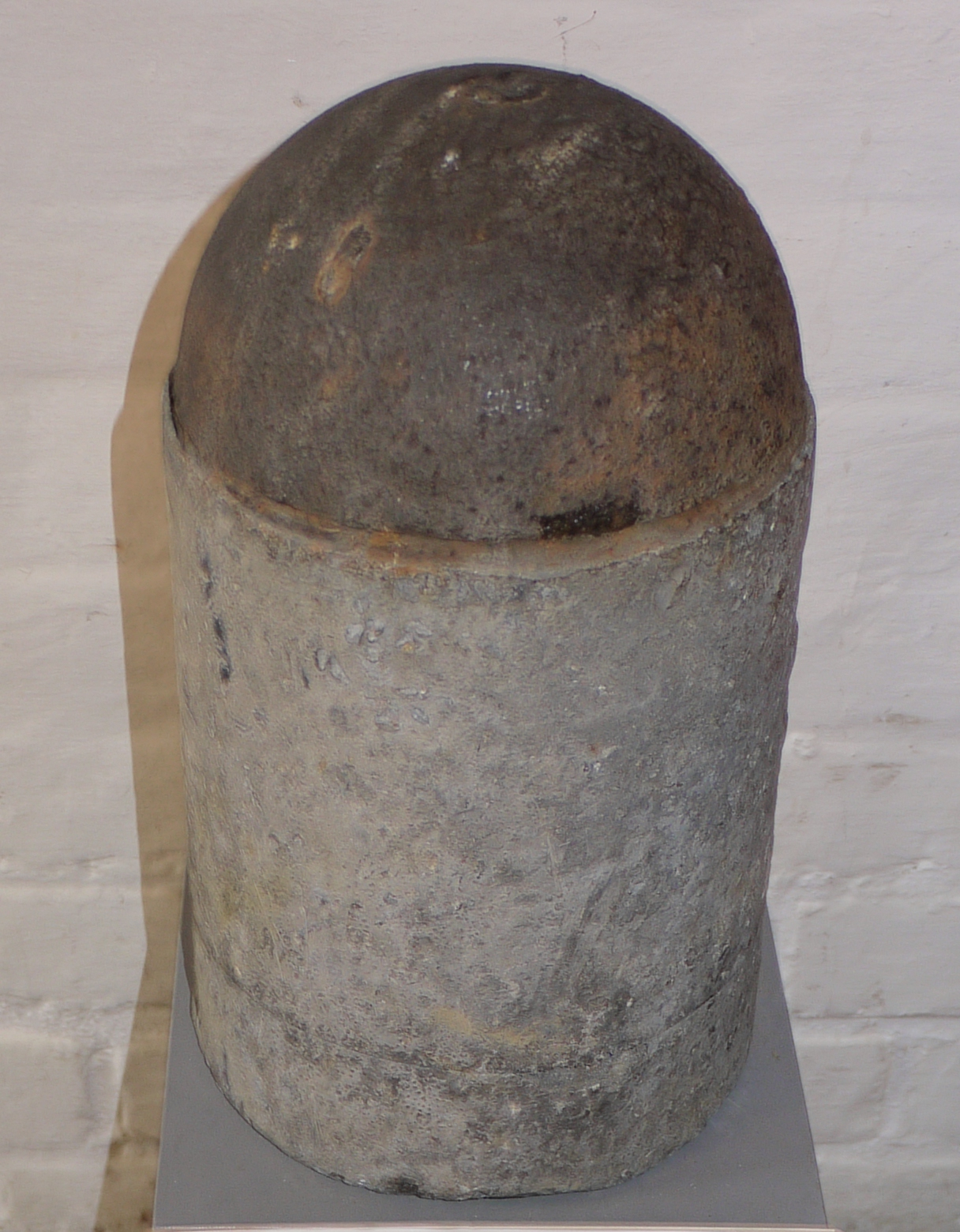
The lead-coated shell used by the gun

== Surviving examples ==
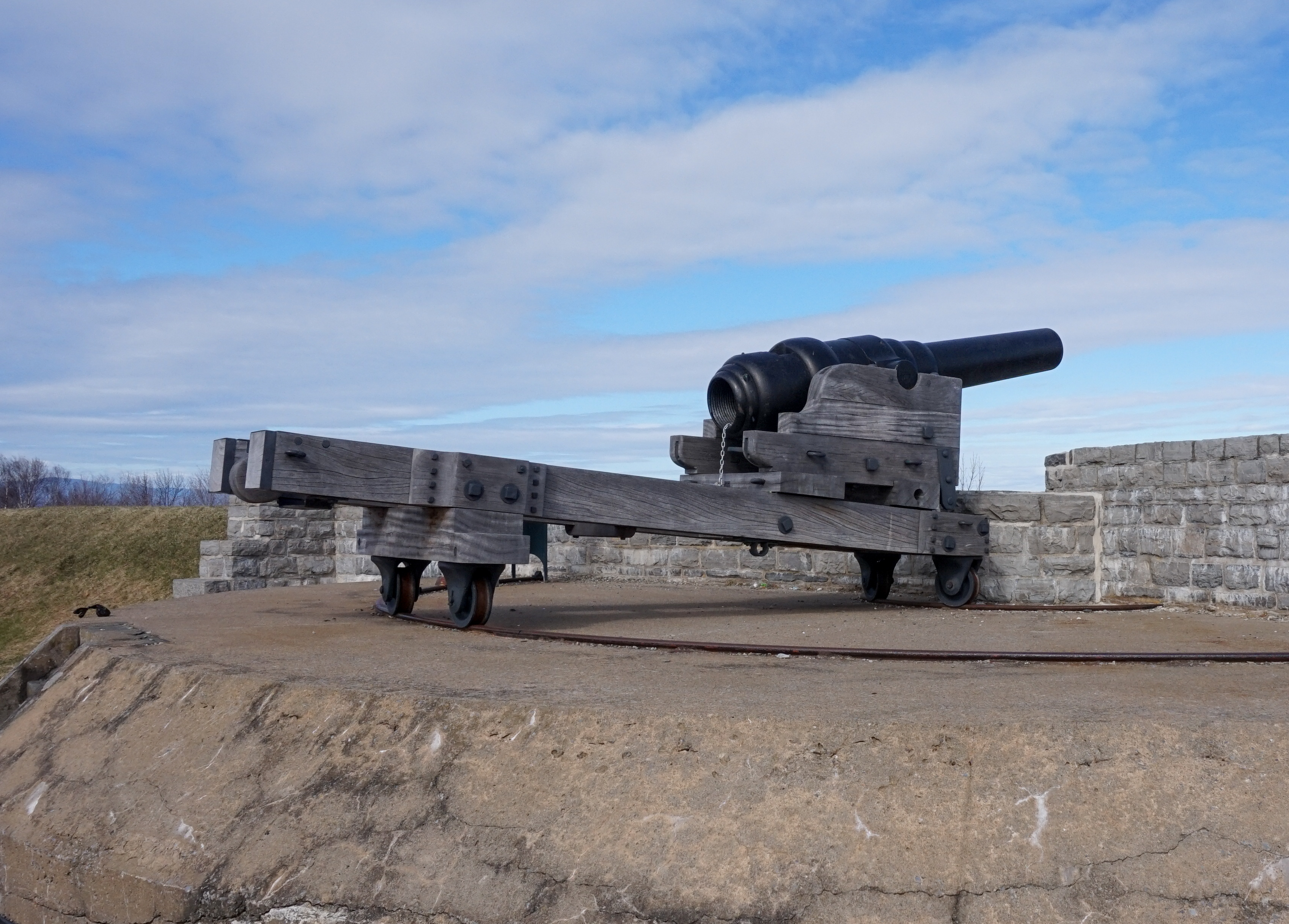
RBL 7-inch Armstrong gun in Fort No 1, Lévis, Quebec, Canada

- An 82cwt gun at Victoria Barracks, Sydney
- An 82cwt gun at Saint Helier, Jersey
- A 72cwt gun at Fort Nelson, Portsmouth, UK. It is fitted with a replica breech and carriage.
- At Fort Henry, Ontario, Canada
- A 72 cwt gun at Quebec Citadel, Canada
- A 72 cwt gun at Fort No. 1, Lévis, Quebec

== See also ==
- Armstrong Gun
- List of naval guns

== Bibliography ==
- Treatise on Ammunition. War Office, UK, 1877
- Treatise on the construction and manufacture of ordnance in the British service. War Office, UK, 1877
- Treatise on the Construction and Manufacture of Ordnance in the British Service. War Office, UK, 1879
- Text Book of Gunnery, 1887. LONDON : PRINTED FOR HIS MAJESTY'S STATIONERY OFFICE, BY HARRISON AND SONS, ST. MARTIN'S LANE
- Text Book of Gunnery, 1902. LONDON : PRINTED FOR HIS MAJESTY'S STATIONERY OFFICE, BY HARRISON AND SONS, ST. MARTIN'S LANE
- Alexander Lyman Holley, "A Treatise on Ordnance and Armor" published by D Van Nostrand, New York, 1865
- Jones, Colin (1999). "'Disarmed and Disappointed'? The Experience of the Armstrong Breech-loading Guns, 1863–1864". Mariner's Mirror. 85 (2): 205–212. doi:10.1080/00253359.1999.10656742. ISSN 0025-3359.
- Lieutenant-Colonel C H Owen R.A., "The principles and practice of modern artillery". Second edition, published by John Murray, London, 1873
- W.L. Ruffell, "The Armstrong Gun Part 4: Other Armstrong Equipments in New Zealand" – use ashore in New Zealand Wars
- W.L. Ruffell, "The Armstrong Gun Part 5: British revert to Muzzle Loading"
