= Lord Clyde =

Lord Clyde may refer to

- Colin Campbell, 1st Baron Clyde (1792–1863), Scottish field marshal
- James Avon Clyde, Lord Clyde (1863–1944), Scottish Conservative politician and judge
- James Latham Clyde, Lord Clyde (1898–1975), Scottish Unionist politician and judge
- James Clyde, Baron Clyde (1932–2009), Scottish judge in the House of Lords
- SS Lord Clyde, a steamer built on the Clyde in 1862, sold as a blockade runner as Advance, and later in the US Navy
- HMS Lord Clyde (1864), a class of steam ironclad warships of the Royal Navy
- Lord Clyde-class ironclad, a class of steam ironclad warships of the Royal Navy named after HMS Lord Clyde
