= List of shipwrecks in March 1872 =

The list of shipwrecks in March 1872 includes ships sunk, foundered, grounded, or otherwise lost during March 1872.

== 1 March ==
List of shipwrecks: 1 March 1872
Ship	State	Description
John Temperley	United Kingdom	The ship was sighted off the Virginia Capes whilst on a voyage from Baltimore, Maryland, United States to London. No further trace, presumed foundered with the loss of all hands.
Robin Hood	United Kingdom	The ship was sighted in the Indian Ocean whilst on a voyage from Surabaya, Netherlands East Indies to Rotterdam, South Holland, Netherlands. No further trace, presumed foundered with the loss of all hands.
St. Helena	United Kingdom	The steamship was driven ashore and wrecked at Cape Helles, Ottoman Empire.
Unnamed	United Kingdom	The schooner ran aground in Liverpool Bay.

== 2 March ==
List of shipwrecks: 2 March 1872
Ship	State	Description
Conflict	United Kingdom	The ship was driven ashore and wrecked in Ballyquintin Bay. She was on a voyage from Ardrossan, Ayrshire to Dublin.
Example	United Kingdom	The ship was driven ashore at Donaghadee, County Down. She was refloated and towed in to Belfast, County Antrim.
Lucy Ann	United Kingdom	The ship was driven ashore at Ballyferris, County Down. She was on a voyage from Troon, Ayrshire to Dublin.
Margaret Sutton	United Kingdom	The ship was driven ashore near Stranraer, Wigtownshire and was abandoned by her crew. She was on a voyage from Troon, Ayrshire to Cork. She was refloated on 27 March and taken in to Ardrossan.
Merewestroom	Netherlands	The schooner ran aground on the Sunk Sand, in the North Sea off the coast of Essex, United Kingdom. She was on a voyage from Dordrecht, South Holland to Livorno, Italy. She was refloated with assistance from Prince of Orange (Netherlands) and the smacks Running Rein and Volunteer (both United Kingdom).
Pera	United Kingdom	The tug was run into by the steamship Braganza (United Kingdom) and sank in the River Mersey. Her crew were rescued. Pera was on a voyage from South Shields, County Durham to Liverpool, Lancashire. She was refloated.
Princess Victoria	United Kingdom	The ship was driven ashore and wrecked in the Copeland Islands, County Donegal.
Storm King	United Kingdom	The brig foundered in the North Sea off Flamborough Head, Yorkshire. Her nine crew were rescued by the schooner Veracity (United Kingdom). Storm King was on a voyage from North Shields, Northumberland to a European port and had run aground on the Haisborough Sands, in the North Sea off the coast of Norfolk. She had been refloated and was putting back to North Shields.
Unnamed	United Kingdom	The barque ran aground on the Goodwin Sands, Kent. She was refloated and resumed her voyage.
Unnamed	Canada	The barque ran aground on the Goodwin Sands. She was refloated and taken in to The Downs.

== 3 March ==
List of shipwrecks: 3 March 1872
Ship	State	Description
Fido	United Kingdom	The steamship ran aground near Swinemünde, Germany. She was on a voyage from Hull, Yorkshire to Swinemünde.
Johannes Blohm	Germany	The ship was abandoned at sea and was presumed to have foundered. She was on a voyage from the Rio Grande to Hamburg.

== 4 March ==
List of shipwrecks: 4 March 1872
Ship	State	Description
Cissy	United States	The ship was driven ashore on Spiteful Island, in the Min River. She was on a voyage from Fuzhou, China to an American port. She was refloated and put back to Fuzhou.
Elbing	Germany	The barque was driven ashore on Skagen, Denmark. She was on a voyage from Memel to Alloa, Clackmannanshire, United Kingdom. She had become a wreck by 8 March.
St. Aubin	Malta	The schooner ran aground off "Mazzarro" and was wrecked. She was on a voyage from Malta to Marsala, Sicily, Italy.
Two Brothers	United Kingdom	The ship was driven ashore between Penryndy Point and Penkillan Head, Caernarfonshire. She was on a voyage from Aberdovey, Merionethshire to Newry, County Antrim.

== 5 March ==
List of shipwrecks: 5 March 1872
Ship	State	Description
Alexandra	United Kingdom	The ship was driven ashore and wrecked at Hirtshals, Denmark. Her crew were rescued. She was on a voyage from "Nielsson" to Alloa, Clackmannanshire.
Denmark	United Kingdom	The extreme clipper sank off Bermuda in a storm. Her crew survived. She was on a voyage from Rio de Janeiro, Brazil to Saint John, New Brunswick, Canada.
Hindostan	United Kingdom	The ship was driven ashore 7 nautical miles (13 km) north of Aberdeen. She was on a voyage from Pensacola, Florida to Inverness and Aberdeen. She was refloated on 8 March and completed her voyage.
Jamaican	United Kingdom	The steamship ran aground off Fort Augusta, Jamaica. She was refloated on 13 March.
Lumley Castle	United Kingdom	The steamship collided with the steamship Atlanta (United Kingdom) and was beached in Gibraltar Bay. She was on a voyage from South Shields, County Durham to Aden. She was refloated on 1 April and temporary repairs were made. She departed from Gibraltar for Cádiz, Spain on 24 April and was repaired there.
Edward, or Onward	Germany	The brig was driven ashore on Skagen, Denmark. She was on a voyage from Memel to Grangemouth, Stirlingshire, United Kingdom. She was refloated with assistance and resumed her voyage.
Ranavola	United Kingdom	The ship was driven ashore between Sunderland, County Durham and Souter Point, Northumberland. She was on a voyage from South Shields, County Durham to Singapore, Straits Settlements. She was refloated and put back to South Shields.
Rose Mysterieuse	France	The fishing smack collided with the schooner Wilson (United Kingdom) and sank in the English Channel 5 nautical miles (9.3 km) off Hastings, Sussex, United Kingdom.
Sirene	France	The ship ran aground. She was on a voyage from Rouen, Seine-Inférieure to Rotterdam, South Holland, Netherlands. She was refloated and towed in to Hellevoetsluis, Zeeland, Netherlands.

== 6 March ==
List of shipwrecks: 6 March 1872
Ship	State	Description
Alexandria	Sweden	The ship was driven ashore and wrecked at Hirtshals, Denmark. Her crew were rescued. She was on a voyage from Gothenburg to Alloa, Clackmannanshire, United Kingdom.
Anna	Germany	The brig was wrecked on the Memory Rock, Bahamas. She was on a voyage from Laguna to Falmouth, Cornwall, United Kingdom.
Etna	United Kingdom	The Mersey Flat collided with the steamship Antenor (United Kingdom) and sank in the River Mersey.
Jacob Anna	Netherlands	The ship was driven ashore on Skagen, Denmark. She was on a voyage from Amsterdam, North Holland, Netherlands to Riga, Russia.
Reform	Norway	The ship was driven ashore on Skagen. She was on a voyage from Porsgrund to Truro, Cornwall, United Kingdom.
Sophia Maria	Netherlands	The ship was driven ashore on Vargö, Sweden. She was on a voyage from Messina, Sicily, Italy to Stettin, Germany.
Stromness	United Kingdom	The ship was wrecked on Inagua, Bahamas.
Morning Star	United Kingdom	The barque ran aground on the Longsand, in the North Sea off the coast of Essex, United Kingdom.

== 7 March ==
List of shipwrecks: 7 March 1872
Ship	State	Description
USS Abeona	United States Navy	The gunboat caught fire and was destroyed in the Mississippi River at Cincinnati, Ohio.
Trende Brodre	Denmark	The ship was driven ashore on Læsø. She was refloated and taken in to Fredrikshavn.

== 8 March ==
List of shipwrecks: 8 March 1872
Ship	State	Description
Argo	United Kingdom	The barque was wrecked near Arroyo, Puerto Rico.
John Temperley	United States	The ship foundered off Cape Henry, Virginia. She was on a voyage from Baltimore, Maryland to London, United Kingdom.
Verona	Spain	The schooner was wrecked off Boca Grande, Florida, United States.
Zeyla	United States	The schooner was abandoned at sea. Her crew were rescued by the barque Oder ( Canada).
Unnamed	Flag unknown	The ship ran aground in the Sluische Gat, off the Dutch coast.

== 9 March ==
List of shipwrecks: 9 March 1872
Ship	State	Description
Billow Crest	United Kingdom	The ship was driven ashore at Mehdia, Beylik of Tunis.
Fred	United Kingdom	The ship was driven ashore at Dunfanaghy, County Donegal. She was on a voyage from Liverpool, Lancashire to Ramelton, County Donegal. She was refloated the next day and taken in to Mulroy Bay in a waterlogged condition.
Hero	United Kingdom	The brig was run down and sunk in the English Channel off Caen, Calvados, France by the barque Osbert (United Kingdom). Her crew were rescued by Osbert.
John Christie	United States	The ship was abandoned in the Atlantic Ocean in a sinking condition. Her crew were rescued.
Marianne	Denmark	The schooner was driven ashore at Mazagan, Morocco.
Speed	United Kingdom	The brigantine ran aground on the Blacktail Sand, in the Thames Estuary. She was on a voyage from Aberdeen to London. She was refloated and resumed her voyage.
Steinwarden	Germany	The steamboat collided with the steamship Albert (United Kingdom) and was beached near Hamburg.
Storm King	United Kingdom	The ship foundered in the North Sea off Whitby, Yorkshire. Her crew were rescued. She was on a voyage from South Shields, County Durham to a Spanish port.

== 10 March ==
List of shipwrecks: 10 March 1872
Ship	State	Description
G. H. Peale	Western Australia	The brig was driven ashore at Bunbury. She was refloated.
McDonnell	United Kingdom	The barque ran aground on the Haisborough Sands, in the North Sea off the coast of Norfolk. and was abandoned by all but four of her crew. She was on a voyage from South Shields, County Durham to Garrucha, Spain.
Midas	Western Australia	The ship was wrecked in a cyclone at Bunbury West.
Nina	Western Australia	The steamship was wrecked at Bunbury.
Ocean Chief	United Kingdom	The clipper collided with the steamship Thomas Wilson (United Kingdom) and sank in the Royapore Reach of the Hooghly River. A crew member was reported missing. Ocean Chief was on a voyage from Rio de Janeiro, Brazil to Calcutta, India.
Otto	Germany	The brig was wrecked on the Goagua Bank. She was on a voyage from Maracaibo, Venezuela to the English Channel.
Peiho	Straits Settlements	The steamship foundered in the Gulf of Pe-chi-li. At least some of her crew survived. Those in one of her boats were reported missing.
Rio	Western Australia	The brig was driven ashore at Bunbury. She was refloated.

== 11 March ==
List of shipwrecks: 11 March 1872
Ship	State	Description
Commerce	Norway	The brig was driven ashore and wrecked. She was on a voyage from Kristiansand to Sunderland, County Durham, United Kingdom.
Hector	United Kingdom	The ship departed from Liverpool, Lancashire for New York, United States. No further trace, presumed foundered with the loss of all hands.
Isabella	United Kingdom	The brig was reported to have foundered 80 nautical miles (150 km) off Montrose, Forfarshire. Her eight crew took to two boats; five crew in one of the boats landed on Stronsay, Orkney Islands on 14 March. Those in the other boat were rescued on 16 March by the smack Lily (United Kingdom). Isabella was taken in to Egersund, Norway in a derelict condition on 16 March.
Leda	United Kingdom	The schooner was abandoned 25 nautical miles (46 km) off the Smalls Lighthouse, Cornwall. Her crew were rescued by Margaret (United Kingdom). Leda was subsequently towed in to Ilfracombe, Devon by Liberty (United Kingdom).
San José	Spain	The ship put in to Barcelona in a leaky condition and sank there. Her crew were rescued. She was on a voyage from Alicante to Marseille, Bouches-du-Rhône, France.
Triumph	United States	The barque was abandoned in the Atlantic Ocean. Her crew were rescued by the steamship Bremen (Germany). Triumph was on a voyage from London, United Kingdom to Providence, Rhode Island.

== 12 March ==
List of shipwrecks: 12 March 1872
Ship	State	Description
Chittagong	India	The brig collided with the steamship Chittagong (India) and sank in the Indian Ocean 30 nautical miles (56 km) off Galle, Ceylon. One of her nineteen crew was reported missing.
Eastern Star	United Kingdom	The barque was driven ashore on Verde Island, Spanish East Indies. She was on a voyage from Manila to Iloilo. She was refloated and resumed her voyage.
Johanne	Norway	The schooner was driven ashore and wrecked at Peterhead, Aberdeenshire, United Kingdom. She was on a voyage from Mandal to Peterhead.
Kate	(Dominion of Newfoundland) Newfoundland Colony	The sealer, a schooner, was wrecked in Conception Bay. Her crew were rescued.
Marion	India	The brig collided with the steamship Bengalese (India) and sank in the Indian Ocean with the loss of one of her nineteen crew.
Marquis of Lorne	United Kingdom	The schooner struck the Harry Furlong Rocks and capsized. Her crew were rescued by the tug Speedwell (United Kingdom). Marquis of Lorne was on a voyage from Par, Cornwall to Runcorn, Cheshire.
Sarah Sloan	Canada	The barque was wrecked off Grand Manan, New Brunswick with the loss of two lives. She was on a voyage from Saint John, New Brunswick to Havana, Cuba.
Southern Cross	United States	The fishing schooner lost in the ice off Newfoundland. Crew saved.
Thomas Wilson	United Kingdom	The steamship ran aground at Fultah Point, in the Hooghly River. She was on a voyage from Calcutta to Bombay, India. She was refloated and put back to Calcutta.
Unnamed	Flag unknown	The brig sank off The Skerries, Anglesey.

== 13 March ==
List of shipwrecks: 13 March 1872
Ship	State	Description
Argos	United Kingdom	The barque was driven ashore at Guilarte, Puerto Rico.
HMS Aurora	Royal Navy	The Imperieuse-class frigate ran aground on the St. Nicholas Reef, in Plymouth Sound. She was on a voyage from Plymouth, Devon to Gibraltar and Malta.
Eastham	United Kingdom	The ship was driven ashore south of Bridlington, Yorkshire. She was on a voyage from Susa to Aberdeen. She was refloated and resumed her voyage.
Fisherman	(France) Mauritius	The ship was wrecked at "Samatave" with the loss of a crew member.
Gustave	United States	The ship was wrecked on Cape Cod, Massachusetts. She was on a voyage from Boston, Massachusetts to Cádiz, Spain.
Ionia	United Kingdom	The steamship was driven ashore near Ferrol, Spain. She was on a voyage from the River Tyne to Bombay, India.
Isabel	Germany	The ship was run down and sunk by the steamship Yoruba (United Kingdom) off The Skerries, Anglesey, United Kingdom. Two of her seven crew were rescued by Yoruba, the others reached land in their boat. Isabel was on a voyage from Santa Martha to Liverpool, Lancashire, United Kingdom.

== 14 March ==
List of shipwrecks: 14 March 1872
Ship	State	Description
Alberta	United Kingdom	The schooner ran aground in the Menai Strait. She was on a voyage from Caernarfon to Glasgow, Renfrewshire. She was refloated and taken in to Beaumaris, Anglesey in a severely leaky condition.
Captain Hathorn	United Kingdom	The ship was driven ashore on Puffin Island, Anglesey. She was on a voyage from Newport, Monmouthshire to Barrow-in-Furness, Lancashire. She was refloated and taken in to Beaumaris, Anglesey.
Enniskillen, and Messina	United Kingdom	The steamship became wedged together in the lock at Grangemouth, Stirlingshire. Enniskillen was slightly damaged, Messina was severely damaged. They were both extricated and taken in to Grangemouth.
HMS Lord Clyde	Royal Navy	The Lord Clyde-class ironclad ran aground off Pantellaria, Italy. Subsequently refloated, repaired and returned to service.
Marie Adele	France	The ship sank at Locmariaquer, Morbihan. She was on a voyage from Nantes, Loire-Inférieure to Gloucester, United Kingdom.
Mary Annie	United Kingdom	The ship was driven ashore at Mogador, Morocco. Her crew were rescued. She was condemned and sold. Refloated on 22 March, she was subsequently returned to service as San José under the Spanish flag.
Seline	France	The schooner foundered off Lamlash, Isle of Arran, United Kingdom with the loss of four of her six crew. She was on a voyage from Dunkirk, Nord to Greenock, Renfrewshire.
Unity	United Kingdom	The ship struck the quayside at Boscastle, Cornwall and was wrecked.

== 15 March ==
List of shipwrecks: 15 March 1872
Ship	State	Description
Huntress	New Zealand	The 54-ton schooner hit rocks in a heavy sea to the north of the Hauraki Gulf while sailing in ballast from Thames to Russell and came ashore to the south of Cape Brett. All hands were saved.

== 16 March ==
List of shipwrecks: 16 March 1872
Ship	State	Description
Margaret Harrison	United Kingdom	The ship was driven ashore on the coast of Zeeland, Netherlands. She was refloated and towed in to Brouwershaven.
Orchis	United Kingdom	The steamship was driven ashore at Hope Cove, Devon. She was on a voyage from Calcutta, India to Liverpool, Lancashire.
Unnamed	Netherlands	The lighter was run down and sunk by the steamship Harlequin (United Kingdom) at Rotterdam, South Holland with some loss of life.

== 17 March ==
List of shipwrecks: 17 March 1872
Ship	State	Description
J. W. Halfield	United Kingdom	The schooner was abandoned in the Atlantic Ocean. Her crew were rescued. She was on a voyage from Halifax, Nova Scotia, Canada to Puerto Rico.

== 18 March ==
List of shipwrecks: 18 March 1872
Ship	State	Description
Corsair	United Kingdom	The ship ran aground and was wrecked at Le Tréport, Seine-Inférieure, France. She was on a voyage from Sunderland, County Durham to Le Tréport.
Ethel	United States	The brigantine was abandoned in the Atlantic Ocean. Her crew were rescued.
Gertrude	United Kingdom	The ship struck rocks and was damaged. She put in to Amlwch, Anglesey in a sinking condition. She was on a voyage from the River Dee to Wicklow.
Jane A. Bishop	United Kingdom	The ship was driven ashore on São Miguel Island, Azores and was wrecked with the loss of a crew member. She was on a voyage from the Gaboon River to Hamburg, Germany.
J. B. Campbell	(Dominion of Newfoundland) Newfoundland Colony	The ship was holed by ice and sank. She was on a voyage from Harbour Grace to New York, United States.
Oscar	Greece	The brig was wrecked on the Tannah Rocks, in the Mellacorée River. Her crew were rescued.
William	United Kingdom	The brigantine foundered off Black Head, County Antrim with the loss of all hands. She was on a voyage from Greenock, Renfrewshire to Belfast, County Antrim.

== 19 March ==
List of shipwrecks: 19 March 1872
Ship	State	Description
Arethusa	United Kingdom	The brigantine was driven ashore and wrecked on Rathlin Island, County Donegal. Her five crew survived. She was on a voyage from Glasgow, Renfrewshire to Londonderry.
Celine	France	The schooner foundered with the loss of her captain. She was on a voyage from Dunkirk, Nord to Greenock, Renfrewshire.
Defender	United Kingdom	The brig ran aground and was wrecked on the Goodwin Sands, Kent. He eight crew were rescued by the Broadstairs Lifeboat and the Ramgate Lifeboat Bradford ( Royal National Lifeboat Institution). She was on a voyage from Sunderland to Dieppe, Seine-Inférieure.
Elvire	United Kingdom	The schooner was driven ashore at Cap Gris Nez, Pas-de-Calais, France.
Genius	Germany	The schooner ran aground at Cuxhaven.
Gleaner	United Kingdom	The schooner was wrecked on the Longsand, in the North Sea off the coast of Essex. Her nine crew were rescued by the steamship Joseph Straker (United Kingdom). Gleaner was on a voyage from Leith, Lothian to Livorno, Italy.
Haidee	United Kingdom	The ship foundered in the North Channel.
Margaret	United Kingdom	The barque ran aground off Terneuzen, Zeeland, Netherlands. She was on a voyage from Almería, Spain to Antwerp.
Neandre	United Kingdom	The steamship caught fire and was beached at Galata Point, in the Dardanelles. She was severely damaged.
Rover	United Kingdom	The brig was abandoned 30 nautical miles (56 km) west south west of the North Foreland, Kent. Her crew were rescued. She was on a voyage from South Shields, County Durham to Rotterdam, South Holland, Netherlands.
Victoria	United Kingdom	The schooner ran aground on the Longsand. She was on a voyage from Hull, Yorkshire to the Charente. She was refloated but consequently foundered off the North Foreland, Kent. Her crew were rescued.

== 20 March ==
List of shipwrecks: 20 March 1872
Ship	State	Description
Christina	United Kingdom	The ship ran aground on the Sunk Sand, in the North Sea off the coast of Essex and sank. Her crew were rescued. She was on a voyage from Guernsey, Channel Islands to London.
Edmond Meert	Belgium	The ship was wrecked on the Brea Bank. Her crew were rescued. She was on a voyage from Newcastle upon Tyne, Northumberland, United Kingdom to Ostend, West Flanders.
Idun	Denmark	The schooner was driven ashore on Skagen.
Mercedes	United States	The ship was wrecked off Cape Hatteras, North Carolina. She was on a voyage from Cienfuegos, Cuba to New York.
Morning Star	(United Kingdom of Great Britain and Ireland) Guernsey	The brigantine was driven ashore and wrecked at Dungeness, Kent. Her crew were rescued. She was on a voyage from London to Trinidad.
Norwood	United Kingdom	The ship was driven ashore at Bombay, India.
Panama	United Kingdom	The ship was driven ashore on Skagen. Her crew were rescued. She was on a voyage from South Shields, County Durham to Copenhagen, Denmark. She had broken up by 29 March.

== 21 March ==
List of shipwrecks: 21 March 1872
Ship	State	Description
Advance	United Kingdom	The steamship was abandoned in the North Sea 220 nautical miles (410 km) north east of Hartlepool, County Durham. Her crew were rescued by the smack Consolation (United Kingdom). Advance was on a voyage from Middlesbrough, Yorkshire to Gothenburg, Sweden.
Americano	Uruguay	The steamship was wrecked at Rosario Oriental. She was on a voyage from Montevideo to Buenos Aires, Argentina.
Bogota	United States of Colombia	The steamship was driven ashore and wrecked at "Curampe", or "Wranipe".
Payta	United Kingdom	The steamship was driven ashore and damaged at Antofagasta. She was on avoyage from Callao, Peru to Liverpool. She was refloated and put back to Callao.

== 22 March ==
List of shipwrecks: 22 March 1872
Ship	State	Description
Ananias Dekki	Norway	The barque was wrecked on the Bare Bush Key. She was on a voyage from Newport, Monmouthshire, United Kingdom to New Orleans, Louisiana, United States.
Eneas McIntyre	(Dominion of Newfoundland) Newfoundland Colony	The sealer, a schooner, was lost in ice off Langlade Island. Her crew were rescued.
Hope	United Kingdom	The schooner was driven ashore west of Burnham Overy Staithe, Norfolk. Her crew were rescued. She was on a voyage from South Shields, County Durham to Whitstable, Kent.
Mary Toyer	(Dominion of Newfoundland) Newfoundland Colony	The sealer, a schooner, was lost in ice off Langlade Island. Her crew were rescued.

== 23 March ==
List of shipwrecks: 23 March 1872
Ship	State	Description
Graf Moltke	Germany	The barque was wrecked on the Bare Bush Key. She was on a voyage from Newport, Monmouthshire, United Kingdom to Veracruz, Mexico.
Kentport, or Kentville	United Kingdom	The ship was sighted in the Atlantic Ocean whilst on a voyage from Liverpool, Lancashire to Hong Kong. No further trace, presumed foundered with the loss of all hands.
Maria Hey	United Kingdom	The ship foundered in the Atlantic Ocean (42°36′S 37°06′W). Her crew took to a boat; four of them died before 9 May when the survivors were rescued by British America (United Kingdom). Maria Hey was on a voyage from the Guañape Islands, Peru to London.
Salamander	United Kingdom	The schooner sprang a leak and foundered in the Mediterranean Sea 30 nautical miles (56 km) off Calvi, Corsica, France. Her crew were rescued. She was on a voyage from Newcastle upon Tyne, Northumberland to Genoa, Italy.
Singapore	Netherlands	The ship departed from Saigon, French Indo-China for Hong Kong. No further trace, presumed foundered with the loss of all hands.

== 24 March ==
List of shipwrecks: 24 March 1872
Ship	State	Description
HMS Defence	Royal Navy	The Defence-class ironclad was driven ashore in the Mediterranean Sea. Subsequently refloated, repaired and returned to service.
Gesina Antoinette	Germany	The brig foundered in the North Sea. Her crew were rescued by the schooner Austina (Germany). Gesina Antoinette was on a voyage from Hamburg to Leith, Lothian, United Kingdom.

== 25 March ==
List of shipwrecks: 25 March 1872
Ship	State	Description
Cadmus	France	The ship was driven ashore at Safi, Morocco. Her crew were rescued. She was on a voyage from Havre de Grâce, Seine-Inférieure to Safi.

== 26 March ==
List of shipwrecks: 26 March 1872
Ship	State	Description
Carrie Wright	United Kingdom	The ship ran aground on the Curland Bank, off the coast of County Cork. She was refloated the next day.
Lisette	Germany	The koff ran aground and was wrecked near Bremen. Her crew were rescued. She was on a voyage from Stralsund to Bremen.

== 27 March ==
List of shipwrecks: 27 March 1872
Ship	State	Description
Alice	United Kingdom	The Mersey Flat collided with the schooner Isabella Hall (United Kingdom) and sank in the River Mersey. She was on a voyage from Birkenhead, Cheshire to Liverpool, Lancashire.
Alleanza	Italy	The ship ran aground on the Cross Sand, in the North Sea off the coast of Suffolk, United Kingdom. She was refloated and assisted in to Harwich, Essex, United Kingdom in a severely leaky condition.
Alva	United Kingdom	The ship was abandoned in the Atlantic Ocean. Her crew were rescued by Ville de Blain (France). Alva was on a voyage from Saint John, New Brunswick, Canada to Puerto Rico.
Exe	United Kingdom	The barque ran aground off Pakefield, Suffolk and consequently sank off Lowestoft. Her crew were rescued. she was on a voyage from Sunderland, County Durham to Exeter, Devon. The wreck was dispersed by explosives on 31 May.
Jensine Betty	Denmark	The ship was wrecked on Skagen.
Mary	United Kingdom	The schooner collided with another vessel and sank off Trevose Head, Cornwall. Her four crew were rescued by George the Fourth (United Kingdom).
Naiad	United Kingdom	The ship was wrecked at Arklow, County Wicklow. Her crew were rescued.
Rival	United States	The clipper departed from Rangoon, Burma for Falmouth, Cornwall. No further trace.
Two Brothers	United Kingdom	The ship was driven ashore on Ramsey Island, Pembrokeshire and sank. She was on a voyage from "Porthelash" to Ramsey Islands.
Venus	United Kingdom	The ship was wrecked on the South Breakers, on the coast of Georgia, United States.
Yatala	United Kingdom	The ship was driven ashore at Audresselles, Pas-de-Calais, France. All on board survived. She was on a voyage from Adelaide, South Australia to London.

== 28 March ==
List of shipwrecks: 28 March 1872
Ship	State	Description
Douro	Netherlands	The galliot was driven ashore at Par, Cornwall, United Kingdom. Her crew were rescued by the Par Lifeboat Rochdale and Catherine Rushleigh ( Royal National Lifeboat Institution). Douro was on a voyage from Newcastle upon Tyne, Northumberland to Charlestown, Cornwall.
Ellen Ann	United Kingdom	The schooner was driven ashore at "Poolwash", Isle of Man. Her crew were rescued by rocket apparatus. She was on a voyage from Carmarthen to Irvine, Ayrshire.
Flora Gordon	United Kingdom	The brigantine foundered east of Lambay Island. Her crew were rescued. She was on a voyage from Newry, County Antrim to Liverpool, Lancashire.
Jane and Sarah	United Kingdom	The ship was driven ashore at "Carne". She was on a voyage from Port Talbot, Glamorgan to Wexford.
Lord Hardinge	United Kingdom	The brig ran aground on the Owers Sandbank, in the English Channel off the coast of Sussex and was abandoned. Her crew were rescued by Peeress (United Kingdom). Lord Hardinge was on a voyage from a Welsh port to Newhaven, Sussex.
Marie Adele	France	The brigantine was driven ashore and wrecked at Plymouth, Devon, United Kingdom. She was on a voyage from Bordeaux, Gironde to Plymouth.
Mary Annie	United Kingdom	The ship was driven ashore at Mogador, Morocco. Her crew were rescued. She was consequently condemned.
Polla	United Kingdom	The brigantine ran aground on the Shipwash Sand, in the North Sea off the coast of Suffolk and sank. Her crew were rescued. She was on a voyage from Sunderland, County Durham to Littlehampton, Sussex.
Sarah and Ann	United Kingdom	The ship was driven ashore at Hittarp, Sweden. She was on a voyage from Hartlepool, County Durham to Pillau, Germany. She was refloated and taken in to Helsingør.
Teesdale	United Kingdom	The steamship ran aground off Hurst Castle, Hampshire. Her crew were rescued by the lifeboat Dove ( Royal National Lifeboat Institution). Teesdale subsequently sank and broke in two.
Viatka	Russia	The steamship was driven ashore on "Rogoe Island". She was on a voyage from London, United Kingdom to Reval.
Zwaantje	Germany	The schooner foundered in the English Channel 35 nautical miles (65 km) off St. Catherine's Point, Isle of Wight, United Kingdom with the loss of two of her five crew. Survivors were rescued by the lugger Clarence Paget (United Kingdom). Zwaantje was on a voyage from "Ragnijad" to Antwerp, Belgium.

== 29 March ==
List of shipwrecks: 29 March 1872
Ship	State	Description
Metz	United Kingdom	The ship was abandoned in the Atlantic Ocean. Her crew were rescued. She was on a voyage from Baltimore, Maryland, United States to Belfast, County Antrim.

== 30 March ==
List of shipwrecks: 30 March 1872
Ship	State	Description
Aphrodite	United Kingdom	The ship was driven ashore on Skagen, Denmark. She was on a voyage from South Shields, County Durham to Copenhagen, Denmark. She was refloated and resumed her voyage.
Arab	United Kingdom	The brig was wrecked at the mouth of the River Tay. Her crew were rescued by the steamship Bon Accord (United Kingdom). Arab was on a voyage from South Shields, County Durham to Dundee, Forfarshire.
Betsey C. Milne	United Kingdom	The schooner was driven ashore on Skagen. She was on a voyage from Alloa, Clackmannanshire to Königsberg, Germany.
Florence	United Kingdom	The steamship exploded and sank. Her crew were rescued by the barque Ville Bisuard (France). Florence was on a voyage from Cardiff, Glamorgan to Gibraltar.
Georg Becker	Germany	The ship was driven ashore on Skagen. She was on a voyage from Cardiff to Stettin. She was refloated and resumed her voyage.
Mahia	New Zealand	The 19-ton cutter was driven onto the bar at the mouth of the Wairoa River in a storm and was wrecked.
Matilda	United Kingdom	The brigantine was driven ashore at Bangor, County Down. She was on a voyage from Belfast, County Antrim to Irvine, Ayrshire.
Renfrewshire	United Kingdom	The barque ran aground on Patterson's Rock. She was refloated and anchored off Sanda Island. She was on a voyage from Greenock, Renfrewshire to Quebec City, Canada. She was subsequently taken in to Belfast in a leaky condition.
Unnamed	United Kingdom	The Humber Keel was driven against the Ouse Bridge, York and sank. She was a total loss.

== 31 March ==
List of shipwrecks: 31 March 1872
Ship	State	Description
Ernst	Germany	The lightship was run into by the steamship Akola (Russia) and was severely damaged. She was towed in to Cuxhaven.
Nimrod	United Kingdom	The brig ran aground and was wrecked at Honfleur, Manche, France. Her crew were rescued. She was on a voyage from Honfleur to London.
Sunbeam	United Kingdom	The ship sank in the Pegu River.

== Unknown date ==
List of shipwrecks: Unknown date in March 1872
Ship	State	Description
Abelone	Denmark	The ship was driven ashore on Skagen. She was on a voyage from "Faxoe" to Esbjerg.
Agra	United States	The full-rigged ship was wrecked in the Paracel Islands between 16 and 20 March. She was on a voyage from Hong Kong to New York.
Allan Findley	United Kingdom	The ship ran aground on the Nore. She was on a voyage from Montrose, Forfarshire to London. She was refloated and resumed her voyage.
Alphonse et Marie	France	The ship was driven ashore on Mallorca, Spain. She was on a voyage from Carloforte, Sardinia, Italy to Couëron, Loire-Inférieure.
Amazon	United Kingdom	The ship ran aground on the Florida Reef. She was on a voyage from Galveston, Texas, United States to London.
Ananias Dœkke	Flag unknown	The ship was driven ashore in Darebash Bay, Jamaica. She was on a voyage from Newport, Monmouthshire, United Kingdom to New Orleans, Louisiana, United States.
Annie	United States	The barque was wrecked on the Isle of Pines, Cuba. She was on a voyage from the Zaza River, Cuba to New York.
Annie	Canada	The barque was abandoned in the Atlantic Ocean on or before 9 March. She was on a voyage from Leith, Lothian, United Kingdom to Boston, Massachusetts, United States.
Annie Godine	Norway	The ship ran aground on the Nore. She was on a voyage from Turku, Grand Duchy of Finland to London. She was refloated and resumed her voyage.
Aquila	United Kingdom	The barque was driven ashore near "Coorle". She was on a voyage from Cardiff, Glamorgan to Trieste.
Athens	France	The ship was driven ashore at "Well". She was refloated.
Batchelor	United States	The ship was abandoned at sea. Eight crew were rescued by William and Anna (United States). Batchelor was on a voyage from Matanzas, Cuba to New York.
Bombay	United Kingdom	The East Indiaman was wrecked in the Balabac Strait. Her crew were rescued. She was on a voyage from Iloilo, Spanish East Indies to Falmouth, Cornwall.
Bristow	United Kingdom	The barque ran aground at the mouth of the Yangon River. She was on a voyage from Penang, Straits Settlements to Rangoon, Burma. She was refloated and completed her voyage.
Caroline	Flag unknown	The ship was driven ashore on Hirsholmene, Denmark. She was refloated and resumed her voyage.
Caroline Brown	Canada	The ship was wrecked in ice at Saint John's, Newfoundland Colony. She was on a voyage from Dénia, Spain to Montreal, Quebec.
Cay Diedrich	Germany	The schooner was driven ashore near Strömstad, Sweden. She was on a voyage from Leer to a Norwegian port.
Chase	France	The ship was wrecked near Barbados.
Clara	(Dominion of Newfoundland) Newfoundland Colony	The ship was abandoned in the Atlantic Ocean. Her crew were rescued. She was on a voyage from Harbour Grace to Lisbon, Portugal. Clara was subsequently towed in to Saint John's.
Cloe	United Kingdom	The ship was wrecked in the Cape Fear River. She was on a voyage from Wilmington, Delaware, United States to Queenstown, County Cork.
Count Moltke	Flag unknown	The ship was driven ashore in Darebash Bay. She was on a voyage from New York to Veracruz, Mexico.
Delphia	Germany	The ship was driven ashore near Nakskov, Denmark. She was on a voyage from Warnemünde to London. She was refloated and resumed her voyage.
Echo	United Kingdom	The barque ran aground on the Goodwin Sands, Kent. She was refloated with assistance.
Eleanor Ann	United Kingdom	The ship was wrecked near Douglas, Isle of Man.
Elizabeth	United Kingdom	The ship ran aground on the Nore. She was on a voyage from Sunderland, County Durham to London.
Elizabeth Thoms	Germany	The ship was driven ashore on Anholt. She was on a voyage from Portmadoc, Caernarfonshire to Danzig.
Ellen	Denmark	The schooner was abandoned in the North Sea. Her crew were rescued. She was subsequently discovered by the steamship Dagmar (France) and taken in to Copenhagen.
Eloire	France	The schooner was driven ashore near Calais.
Erycina	United Kingdom	The ship was driven ashore and severely damaged near Port Talbot, Glamorgan. She was on a voyage from Swansea, Glamorgan to Bilbao, Spain. She was refloated with assistance and taken in to Swansea.
Fly	United Kingdom	The smack collided with another vessel and was beached at Milford Haven, Pembrokeshire. She was on a voyage from Newport to Milford Haven.
Franklin Snow	United States	The fishing schooner was lost on Grand Bank. Lost with all 12 crew.
Fratelli Seemana	Italy	The ship was driven ashore at "Mesdia".
Freddy	United Kingdom	The steamship ran aground at Svinør, Norway. She was refloated.
Gamle Lods	Denmark	The schooner was driven ashore at "Zaarbeck".
Gelima	Germany	The ship was driven ashore near Strömstad. She was on a voyage from Leer to a Norwegian port.
Gordon Castle	United Kingdom	The steamship ran aground in the Pearl River.
Harald	Denmark	The schooner was driven ashore on Skagen. She was on a voyage from Holbæk to Korsør. She was refloated with assistance and resumed her voyage.
Hartlepool	United Kingdom	The steamship ran aground at Cádiz. She was on a voyage from Cádiz to Cardiff. She was refloated and resumed her voyage in a leaky condition.
Heinrich	Germany	The galiot was driven ashore at "Fiord Soroen". Her crew were rescued.
Helena	Netherlands	The ship was abandoned in the Atlantic Ocean. She was on a voyage from Wilmington, Delaware to Nassau, Bahamas and Rotterdam, South Holland.
Helene	Germany	The ship was driven ashore near Larvik, Norway.
Henriette Gertrude	Netherlands	The ship was driven ashore at "Passaroeang", Netherlands East Indies. She was on a voyage from Soerabaya, Netherlands East Indies to Amsterdam, North Holland.
Herman Wabbe	Germany	The ship sank near "Meyersburg". Her crew were rescued. She was on a voyage from Dordrecht, South Holland to Geestemünde.
Herumio	Spain	The ship was wrecked near Casablanca, Morocco.
H. K. White	United States	The schooner was abandoned in the Atlantic Ocean. Her crew were rescued by Alice Tarleton ( (Netherlands) Surinam).
Ispahan	United Kingdom	The steamship foundered in the English Channel off Camaret-sur-Mer, Finistère, France with the loss of all hands. She was on a voyage from Bushire, Persia to Dunkirk, Nord, France.
Jane Ellen	United Kingdom	The ship was driven ashore. She was on a voyage from Douglas, Isle of Man to Barrow-in-Furness, Lancashire. She was refloated and taken in to Piel Island, Lancashire.
Jeanette	Germany	The ship ran aground on the Elbe Sand. She was on a voyage from Sunderland to Cuxhaven She was refloated and completed her voyage.
Johanna Jacobs	France	The ship was wrecked at Guadeloupe. She was on a voyage from Guadeloupe to Nantes, Loire-Inférieure.
Josephine	United States	The ship was abandoned at sea. Her crew were rescued. She was on a voyage from Demerara, British Honduras to New York.
Kate	United Kingdom	The barque was wrecked between Cape St. James and Cape Tiwan, French Indo-China.
Kent	United Kingdom	The steamship was driven ashore at the Packerort Lighthouse, Russia. She was on a voyage from Hull, Yorkshire to Reval, Russia. She was refloated and taken in to Baltic Port, Russia in a leaky condition.
Lady Ida Duff	United Kingdom	The schooner was abandoned at sea. Her crew were rescued by a French vessel. She was on a voyage from Macduff, Aberdeenshire to Sunderland.
Lady Jocelyn	United Kingdom	The ship was driven ashore near Fredrikshavn, Denmark. She was on a voyage from Sunderland to Stettin, Germany.
Lochinvar	United Kingdom	The ship ran aground in the Hudson River. She was on a voyage from New York to Buenos Aires, Argentina.
Lothian	United Kingdom	The ship was driven ashore at "Forckrow". She was on a voyage from Blyth, Northumberland to Malmö, Sweden. She was refloated and towed in to Helsingør, Denmark.
Louise Augusta	Germany	The ship ran aground on the Kallebodstrand. She was on a voyage from Memel to South Shields or Sunderland. She was refloated on 29 March and taken in to Copenhagen.
HMS Lord Clyde	Royal Navy	The Lord Clyde-class ironclad ran aground off Pantellaria, Italy whilst going to the assistance of Raby Castle (United Kingdom). She was refloated four days later.
Mabildo	United Kingdom	The ship was driven ashore at Bangor, County Down. She was on a voyage from Belfast, County Antrim to Irvine, Ayrshire.
Mandal	Norway	The ship was driven ashore. She was refloated and taken in to Lossiemouth, Moray, United Kingdom in a leaky condition.
Maria Therese	France	The ship ran aground in the Gaspar Strait. She was attacked by pirates and was abandoned by her crew. She was on a voyage from Bordeaux, Gironde to Saigon, French Indo-China.
Marian	United Kingdom	The ship was driven ashore near Rangoon. She was on a voyage from Liverpool, Lancashire to Rangoon. She was refloated.
Mariana	Spain	The ship ran aground at Punta Arenas, Chile. She was on a voyage from Cádiz to Punta Arenas.
Marleyhill	United Kingdom	The steamship was driven ashore near Southend, Essex. She was on a voyage from Liverpool to London. She was refloated.
Matchless	United States	The fishing schooner sank on the Georges Bank. Lost with all 10 crew.
Mercade	United Kingdom	The ship was abandoned in ice. Her crew were rescued. She was on a voyage from Bristol, Gloucestershire to the Newfoundland Colony.
Mozart	United Kingdom	The barque was abandoned at sea. Her crew were rescued. She was on a voyage from Darien, Georgia, United States to South Shields.
Nicolaus	Germany	The schooner ran aground in the Elbe. She was refloated and resumed her voyage.
Nyasa	United Kingdom	The barque sprang a leak and was beached on "Klappa Island", Netherlands East Indies. She was on a voyage from Sarawak, Malaya to London.
Ocean Bird	United Kingdom	The ship sprang a leak and was beached at Falmouth. She was on a voyage from Preston, Lancashire to Plymouth, Devon.
Olivio	Italy	The ship ran aground at Odesa, Russia.
Oporto	United Kingdom	The steamship ran aground on the Figueirira Rock, off Porto, Portugal. She was on a voyage from Liverpool to Lisbon, Portugal. She was refloated and beached. Oporto was refloated on 8 June.
Paquita	(Spain) Cuba	The barque was abandoned in the Atlantic Ocean. Her crew were rescued by Ada E. Oulton (United Kingdom). Paquita was on a voyage from Havana, Cuba to Falmouth.
Polino S. O.	Flag unknown	The steamship ran aground in the Dardanelles. She was refloated.
Precursor	United Kingdom	The steamship ran aground at Lagos. She was refloated.
Quinden	Netherlands	The barque ran aground on the Goodwin Sands. She was refloated with assistance.
Raby Castle	United Kingdom	The steamship ran aground off Pantellaria before 12 March and was severely damaged. She was on a voyage from Newcastle upon Tyne, Northumberland to Bombay, India.
Ragnar	United Kingdom	The ship ran aground in the Savannah River. She was on a voyage from Savannah, Georgia to Dublin. She was refloated.
Reform	United Kingdom	The ship was driven ashore on Saint Croix and was severely damaged.
Reine de Prevoyance	France	The ship was abandoned in ice on or before 20 November.
Result	Germany	The ship sprang a leak and foundered in the Atlantic Ocean. Her crew were rescued by Helen Dago (Flag unknown).
Royal Family	United Kingdom	The ship was driven ashore. She was on a voyage from Calcutta to Bombay, India. She was refloated and put back to Calcutta.
Ruhtinas	(Russian Empire) Grand Duchy of Finland	The ship was driven ashore at Kingsdown, Kent. She was on a voyage from Kotka to Marseille, Bouches-du-Rhône, France. She was refloated and taken in to The Downs.
Saidi Radossic	Flag unknown	The ship was driven ashore near "Portobuso". She was on a voyage from Cardiff to Trieste.
Sarah Jane	United Kingdom	The ship was driven ashore near Seaham, County Durham.
San José	Spain	The ship sank at Barcelona. She was on a voyage from Alicante to Marseille.
Sarah	United Kingdom	The barque ran aground on the Goodwin Sands. She was on a voyage from Hartlepool, County Durham to New York. She was refloated with assistance and taken in to The Downs.
Sirene	France	The ship ran aground. She was on a voyage from Rouen, Seine-Inférieure to Rotterdam. She was refloated and taken in to Hellevoetsluis, Zeeland.
Sirian Star	United Kingdom	The ship was wrecked at Shelburne, Nova Scotia, Canada. She was on a voyage from London to Philadelphia, Pennsylvania, United States.
Star of the West	United Kingdom	The schooner ran aground 5 nautical miles (9.3 km) east of Cardiff, Glamorgan. She was on a voyage from Newport to Cardiff.
St. Oswin	United Kingdom	The steamship was driven ashore at St. Stephano Point, in the Sea of Marmara. She was refloated and taken in to Constantinople, Ottoman Empire, where she arrived on 5 March.
Suwonada	China	The steamship sank in the Haitaw Strait. She was on a voyage from Hong Kong to Shanghai.
Teresa	Argentina	The schooner sank at Buenos Aires.
Thomas Dallett	(United Kingdom of Great Britain and Ireland) Jamaica	The ship was abandoned at sea. Her crew were rescued. She was on a voyage from Porto Caballo, Venezuela to New York.
Thura	Denmark	The steamship was driven ashore. She was refloated and taken in to Fredrikshavn.
Upton	United Kingdom	The ship ran aground. She was refloated and taken in to Aberystwyth, Cardiganshire in a leaky condition.
Wayfarer	United Kingdom	The brig was wrecked at Dixcove, Dutch Guinea.
Young England	United Kingdom	The ship was driven ashore near "Noya". She was on a voyage from Newcastle upon Tyne to Genoa, Italy. She was refloated and resumed her voyage, but drove ashore at Palma de Mallorca, Spain.
Unnamed	Netherlands	The ship ran aground on the Brake Sand. She was refloated and taken in to The Downs.
