= List of shipwrecks in May 1868 =

The list of shipwrecks in May 1868 includes ships sunk, foundered, grounded, or otherwise lost during May 1868.

== 1 May ==
List of shipwrecks: 1 May 1868
Ship	State	Description
Governor Cushman	United States	The steamship suffered a boiler explosion at Buffalo, New York, killing eleven people. She was on a voyage from Buffalo to Port Colborne, Ontario, Canada.

== 2 May ==
List of shipwrecks: 2 May 1868
Ship	State	Description
Middleton	United Kingdom	The steamship ran aground in the Dardanelles.
Onda	United Kingdom	The ship was abandoned in the Atlantic Ocean. Her crew were rescued by Louise (United Kingdom). Onda was on a voyage from Greenock, Renfrewshire to Quebec City, Canada.

== 3 May ==
List of shipwrecks: 3 May 1868
Ship	State	Description
HMS Lord Warden	Royal Navy	The Lord Clyde-class ironclad ran aground in the Mediterranean Sea. She was subsequently refloated, repaired, and returned to service.
Vesta	United Kingdom	The ship foundered off Barra, Outer Hebrides. She was on a voyage from Liverpool, Lancashire to New York, United States

== 4 May ==
List of shipwrecks: 4 May 1868
Ship	State	Description
Annam Maria	Hamburg	The ship was driven ashore on Amrum, Prussia and was wrecked. Her crew were rescued. She was on a voyage from Hamburg to "Heyer".
Arabian	United States	The sternwheel paddle steamer sank in the Missouri River near Atchison, Kansas.

== 5 May ==
List of shipwrecks: 5 May 1868
Ship	State	Description
Lady Middleton	United Kingdom	The schooner struck a sunken rock and foundered north east of the Isle of Skye, Outer Hebrides. Her crew survived. She was on a voyage from Newcastle upon Tyne, Northumberland to Dublin.
Staffa	United Kingdom	The brig was driven ashore at Dragør, Denmark. She was on a voyage from Riga, Russia to Arbroath, Forfarshire.

== 7 May ==
List of shipwrecks: 7 May 1868
Ship	State	Description
Express	(United Kingdom of Great Britain and Ireland) New Zealand	The schooner was wrecked at Whangaroa.

== 8 May ==
List of shipwrecks: 8 May 1868
Ship	State	Description
Gleaner	United Kingdom	The 135-ton brig was thought to have hit the Seven Stones reef and sank 30 miles (48 km) northwest by west of Land's End, Cornwall. She was on a voyage from Bilbao, Spain to Newport, Monmouthshire.

== 9 May ==
List of shipwrecks: 9 May 1868
Ship	State	Description
Ennerdale	United Kingdom	The barque ran aground on Rathlin Island, County Antrim. She was on a voyage from Ardrossan, Ayrshire to Montreal, Quebec, Canada. She was refloated and put in to Belfast, County Antrim.

== 10 May ==
List of shipwrecks: 10 May 1868
Ship	State	Description
Industry	United Kingdom	The ship ran aground at Faro, Portugal. She was on a voyage from "Savira" to Hull, Yorkshire.
Joseph Hume	United Kingdom	The ship collided with Columbia (United Kingdom). She was on a voyage from Saint Vincent to London. No further trace, presumed foundered with the loss of all hands.
Theta	United Kingdom	The ship was damaged by fire at Tome, Japan.

== 11 May ==
List of shipwrecks: 11 May 1868
Ship	State	Description
Freedom	United Kingdom	The schooner was driven ashore at Donaghadee, County Down. She was on a voyage from Glasgow, Renfrewshire to Brest, Finistère, France.
Jane Campbell	United Kingdom	The ship was driven ashore near the North and South Lighthouse, County Antrim. She was on a voyage from Cardiff, Glamorgan to Portrush, County Antrim. She was refloated and taken in to the Strangford Lough.
Joseph Hume	United Kingdom	The barque collided with Columbia (United States) in the Atlantic Ocean (46°09′N 31°58′W). One sailor got on board Columbia. Joseph Hume was presumed to have subsequently foundered with the loss of all 29 people on board. She was on a voyage from Saint Vincent to London.
HMS Sealark	Royal Navy	The Pandora-class brig-sloop was driven ashore at Kettle Point, Devon. Subsequently refloated, repaired and returned to service.

== 13 May ==
List of shipwrecks: 13 May 1868
Ship	State	Description
Union	United Kingdom	The schooner ran aground at Rabat, Morocco. She was on a voyage from Rabat to Gibraltar.

== 14 May ==
List of shipwrecks: 14 May 1868
Ship	State	Description
Auguste Vicran	Prussia	The ship was wrecked in the Orkney Islands, United Kingdom. She was on a voyage from Memel to Dublin, United Kingdom.
Belfast	United Kingdom	The ship ran aground on the Horse Bank, in the Irish Sea off the coast of Lancashire and was damaged. She was on a voyage from Limerick to Preston, Lancashire.
Canton	United Kingdom	The barque was wrecked at Acajutla, El Salvador.
Erling	Norway	The ship ran aground on the Goodwin Sands, Kent, United Kingdom. She was on a voyage from Christiania to Liverpool, Lancashire.
May	United Kingdom	The ship foundered off Kinsale, County Cork. She was on a voyage from Cardiff, Glamorgan to Boston, Massachusetts, United States.

== 15 May ==
List of shipwrecks: 15 May 1868
Ship	State	Description
Hawk	United Kingdom	The steamship was damaged by fire at Saint John's, Newfoundland Colony.
Lybia	United Kingdom	The barque-rigged steamship struck the Pearl Rock, off Gibraltar and sank. She was on a voyage from Venice, Italy to London.
Pearl	United Kingdom	The smack sprang a leak and sank 5 nautical miles (9.3 km) north west of Padstow, Cornwall. Her three crew survived. She was on a voyage from Porthcawl, Glamorgan to Falmouth, Cornwall.

== 16 May ==
List of shipwrecks: 16 May 1868
Ship	State	Description
Coronation	United Kingdom	The ship foundered 5 nautical miles (9.3 km) off Padstow, Cornwall. Her crew were rescued.
Edith	United Kingdom	The steamship ran aground near Maassluis, Zeeland, Netherlands.
Gesine	Flag unknown	The ship was driven ashore at Agger, Denmark. Her crew were rescued. She was on a voyage from London, United Kingdom to Narva, Russia.
HMS Royalist	Royal Navy	The Rosario-class sloop ran aground at Port-au-Prince, Haiti. She was refloated and taken in to Port Royal, Jamaica for repairs.

== 17 May ==
List of shipwrecks: 17 May 1868
Ship	State	Description
Lizzie Lee	United Kingdom	The ship was wrecked in the Buffalo River.
Mary and Anne, and Norfolk	United Kingdom	The brig Mary and Anne struck the pier, capsized and sank at Boulogne-sur-Mer, Pas-de-Calais, France. She was run into on 24 May by the steamship Norfolk (United Kingdom) and was declared a total loss. Norfolk was also wrecked.
Primera de Puntales	Spain	The steamship exploded and sank at Cádiz.

== 18 May ==
List of shipwrecks: 18 May 1868
Ship	State	Description
Arcadia	United Kingdom	The ship ran aground on the Stag Rocks, near Brook, Isle of Wight. She was on a voyage from Truro, Cornwall to London.
Minerva	United Kingdom	The ship collided with Nestor (United Kingdom) and sank off the Copeland Islands, County Down. She was on a voyage from the Clyde to Gijón, Spain.

== 19 May ==
List of shipwrecks: 19 May 1868
Ship	State	Description
St. Bride	United Kingdom	The ship sprang a leak and sank off Skenagham Point, County Antrim. Two crew were rescued. She was on a voyage from Bangor, County Down to Larne, County Antrim.

== 20 May ==
List of shipwrecks: 20 May 1868
Ship	State	Description
Helene	Belgium	The barque was driven ashore in Cloghy Bay. She was on a voyage from Liverpool, Lancashire, United Kingdom to Kronstadt, Russia. She was refloated with the assistance of a tug and resumed her voyage.
William Miles	United Kingdom	The ship was wrecked at Pensacola, Florida, United States. She was on a voyage from Pensacola to Queenstown, County Cork.

== 21 May ==
List of shipwrecks: 21 May 1868
Ship	State	Description
Rambler	United Kingdom	The ship was abandoned off St. Abb's Head, Berwickshire. She was on a voyage from Middlesbrough, Yorkshire to Riga, Russia.

== 22 May ==
List of shipwrecks: 22 May 1868
Ship	State	Description
Garonne	United Kingdom	The steamship ran aground and was wrecked on the Buck Rocks, near Land's End, Cornwall with the loss of nineteen of the 37 people on board. She was on a voyage from Liverpool, Lancashire to Bordeaux, Gironde, France.
Hope	United Kingdom	The brig sprang a leak and was abandoned in the Atlantic Ocean. Her crew were rescued by the steamship Beatriz (Spain). Hope was on a voyage from Pomaron, Portugal to Liverpool, Lancashire.
Moravia	United States	The ship ran aground at Dundee, Forfarshire, United Kingdom.
Templar	United Kingdom	The ship was driven ashore at Nantucket, Massachusetts, United States and was abandoned by her crew. She was on a voyage from Calcutta, India to Boston, Massachusetts. She was refloated and towed in to Edgartown, Massachusetts in a derelict condition.

== 23 May ==
List of shipwrecks: 23 May 1868
Ship	State	Description
Benares	United Kingdom	The steamship ran aground in the Fisherman's Group, China and was wrecked.
Blue Bell	(United Kingdom of Great Britain and Ireland) New Zealand	The 53-ton schooner foundered off Whangaroa Heads.
Lessing	Bremen	The ship was wrecked on Fair Isle, Shetland Islands, United Kingdom. All 480 people on board survived.
Martha Birnie	United Kingdom	The ship was run into by Lottie Maria (United Kingdom) in The Downs and was severely damaged. She was on a voyage from London to Sydney, New South Wales. She put back to London for repairs.
Mystery	United Kingdom	The steamship ran aground and was wrecked north of Port Patrick, Wigtownshire. All on board were rescued. She was on a voyage from Newry, County Antrim to Ardrossan, Ayrshire.

== 24 May ==
List of shipwrecks: 24 May 1868
Ship	State	Description
Heroine	United Kingdom	The ship was driven ashore and wrecked on Vlieland, Friesland, Netherlands. She was on a voyage from Swansea, Glamorgan to Hamburg.
Norfolk	United Kingdom	The steamship ran onto the wreck of Mary Ann (United Kingdom) at Boulogne, Pas-de-Calais, France and was severely damaged. She was on a voyage from Boulogne to Hull, Yorkshire.

== 25 May ==
List of shipwrecks: 25 May 1868
Ship	State	Description
Lesmona	China	The ship was captured by pirates and sunk off the Paracel Islands. Her crew were rescued. She was on a voyage from Hong Kong to Shanghai.
Lochnagar	United Kingdom	The ship was wrecked in the Navigator's Islands. Her crew were rescued. She was on a voyage from Baker's Island to an English port.
Prince Frederick William	United Kingdom	The ship was run ashore at Dunaff, County Donegal and was wrecked. She was on a voyage from Grangemouth, Stirlingshire to Quebec City, Canada.
Thomas Connolly	United Kingdom	The ship was driven ashore at Silloth, Cumberland. She was on a voyage from Dublin to Maryport, Cumberland. She was refloated.
Union	Prussia	The ship foundered in the North Sea. Her crew survived. She was on a voyage from Sunderland, County Durham, United Kingdom to Swinemünde.

== 26 May ==
List of shipwrecks: 26 May 1868
Ship	State	Description
Moneta	United Kingdom	The ship caught fire in the Burrard Inlet and was scuttled.

== 27 May ==
List of shipwrecks: 27 May 1868
Ship	State	Description
Guildford	United Kingdom	The barque was wrecked at Bassa, Gambia Colony and Protectorate.

== 28 May ==
List of shipwrecks: 28 May 1868
Ship	State	Description
Emilie	United Kingdom	The ship was abandoned at sea. She was on a voyage from Liverpool, Lancashire to Narva, Russian Empire.
Excelsior	United Kingdom	The schooner was driven ashore and wrecked on Fire Island, New York. She was on a voyage from New York City to Halifax, Nova Scotia, Canada.
Industry	United Kingdom	The ship caught fire off Sheringham, Norfolk. She was on a voyage from Sunderland, County Durham to Colchester, Essex. She was taken in to Blakeney, Norfolk for repairs.
Jacare	United Kingdom	The steamship sank at Buenos Aires, Argentina. She was later refloated and taken in to Tigre for repairs.
Mora	United Kingdom	The ship ran aground at Kurrachee, India. She was on a voyage from Greenock, Renfrewshire to Kurrachee. She was refloated.
Sarah	United Kingdom	The ship was abandoned in the Atlantic Ocean. Her crew were rescued. She was on a voyage from Sunderland, County Durham to Montreal.

== 29 May ==
List of shipwrecks: 29 May 1868
Ship	State	Description
HMS Britomart	Royal Navy	The Britomart-class gunboat was driven ashore at Windmill Point, Quebec, Canada.
Nossa Senhora de Cononco	Portugal	The brig was wrecked on the coast of the Cape Colony with the loss of two of the 116 people on board.

== 30 May ==
List of shipwrecks: 30 May 1868
Ship	State	Description
Disraeli	United Kingdom	The ship was sighted in the Atlantic Ocean whilst on a voyage from Akyab, British Burma to Falmouth, Cornwall. No further trace, presumed foundered with the loss of all hands.
Stephane	France	The ship was wrecked 18 nautical miles (33 km) off St. Andrew's Island She was on a voyage from Aspinwall, United States of Colombia to a Mexican port.

== 31 May ==
List of shipwrecks: 31 May 1868
Ship	State	Description
Coquimbana	Flag unknown	The ship was wrecked in the Falkland Islands.
Providencia	Spain	The schooner was wrecked 5 nautical miles (9.3 km) north of "Arzilla".

== Unknown date ==
List of shipwrecks: Unknown date in May 1868
Ship	State	Description
Actif	France	The ship foundered in the Atlantic Ocean before 18 May. Her crew were rescued. She was on a voyage from Brest, Finistère to the Newfoundland Colony.
Albert Gallatin	United Kingdom	The ship was destroyed by fire at Mobile, Alabama.
Ann	United Kingdom	The steamship ran aground in the Danube. She was on a voyage from Brăila to Sulina, Ottoman Empire and Antwerp, Belgium. She was refloated.
Babinau and Gaudry	Canada	The schooner capsized off Anticosti Island, Nova Scotia before 15 May. She was on a voyage from Montreal, Quebec to Saint John's, Newfoundland Colony.
Bellona	United Kingdom	The ship ran aground at Demerara, British Guiana. She was refloated.
Billow	Canada	The sealer was lost in the Gulf of Saint Lawrence before 11 May.
Canny Scot	Canada	The ship was wrecked at Gaspé, Quebec. She was on a voyage from Marseille, Bouches-du-Rhône, France to Montreal.
Ceres	Canada	The sealer was lost in the Gulf of Saint Lawrence before 11 May.
Clipper	Canada	The sealer was lost in the Gulf of Saint Lawrence before 11 May.
C. Newton	United Kingdom	The ship was lost whilst on a voyage from the Clyde to Montreal.
Crescent	United Kingdom	The ship was abandoned at sea. She was on a voyage from Liverpool, Lancashire to Quebec City, Canada.
Criterion	United Kingdom	The ship was destroyed by fire at Pärnu, Russia.
Ernest	Canada	The sealer was lost in the Gulf of Saint Lawrence before 11 May.
Euxine	United Kingdom	The ship was destroyed by fire at sea before 11 May.
Far East	United Kingdom	The steamship was damaged by fire in Annesley Bay before 11 May. She was taken in to Suez, Egypt for repairs.
Forest Lad	(United Kingdom of Great Britain and Ireland) Jersey	The ship sank at Mocissus, Ottoman Empire.
Gazelle	Canada	The sealer was lost in the Gulf of Saint Lawrence before 11 May.
Home	United Kingdom	The ship foundered in the Atlantic Ocean before 28 May. She was on a voyage from Troon, Ayrshire to Quebec City.
Jules	France	The ship was wrecked on the English Bank, in the River Plate. She was on a voyage from Havre de Grâce, Seine-Inférieure to Montevideo, Uruguay.
Karanjah	(Ottoman Empire) Egypt	The steamship was wrecked in the Red Sea. She was on a voyage from Suez to Jeddah, Jeddah Eyalet.
Lettice Catherine	United Kingdom	The ship was wrecked near Bahia, Brazil before 11 May. She was on a voyage from Liverpool, Lancashire to Montevideo, Uruguay.
Providenzia	Spain	The schooner was wrecked 5 nautical miles (9.3 km) north of Arzila, Morocco. She was on a voyage from Santa Cruz de Tenerife, Canary Islands to Barcelona.
Royal Charlie	United Kingdom	The ship was abandoned at se before 6 May. She was on a voyage from Newcastle upon Tyne, Northumberland to Boston, Massachusetts.
Susan	Canada	The sealer was lost in the Gulf of Saint Lawrence before 11 May.
Vedra	United Kingdom	The ship was lost whilst on a voyage from South Shields, County Durham to Quebec City.
