= HMS Lord Warden =

Ship of the Lord Clyde class of armoured frigates

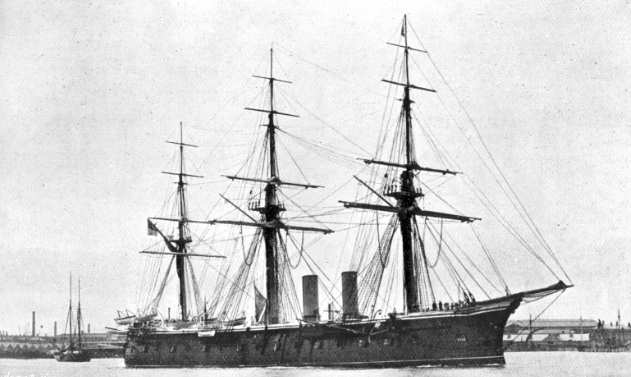
- Lord Warden at anchor

History

United Kingdom
- Name: Lord Warden
- Namesake: Lord Warden of the Cinque Ports
- Ordered: 25 May 1863
- Builder: Chatham Dockyard
- Laid down: 24 December 1863
- Launched: 27 May 1865
- Completed: 30 August 1867
- Commissioned: July 1867
- Decommissioned: 1885
- Fate: Broken up, 1889

General characteristics (as completed)
- Class & type: Lord Clyde-class armoured frigate
- Displacement: 7,940 long tons (8,070 t)
- Tons burthen: 4,080 (bm)
- Length: 280 ft (85.3 m) (p/p)
- Beam: 59 ft (18 m)
- Draught: 27 ft 11 in (8.5 m)
- Installed power: 9 rectangular boilers; 6,700 ihp (5,000 kW)
- Propulsion: 1 shaft; 1 horizontal return connecting rod-steam engine
- Sail plan: Ship rig
- Speed: 13 knots (24 km/h; 15 mph)
- Complement: 605
- Armament: 2 × 9 in (229 mm) rifled muzzle-loading (RML) guns; 14 × 8 in (203 mm) RML guns; 2 × 7 in (180 mm) RML guns
- Armour: Belt: 4.5–5.5 in (114–140 mm); Battery: 4.5–5.5 in (114–140 mm)

HMS Lord Warden was the second and last ship of the wooden-hulled Lord Clyde class of armoured frigates (Note: Ironclad is the all-encompassing term for armored warships of this period. Armoured frigates were basically designed for the same role as traditional wooden frigates, but this later changed as the size and expense of these ships forced them to be used in the line of battle.) built for the Royal Navy (RN) during the 1860s. She and her sister ship, Lord Clyde, were the heaviest wooden ships ever built and were also the fastest steaming wooden ships. They were also the slowest-sailing ironclads in the RN.

After a brief deployment with the Channel Squadron upon commissioning in 1867, Lord Warden was transferred to the Mediterranean Squadron later that year. She became the squadron flagship in 1869 and retained that duty until 1875 when she returned home for a refit. Upon recommissioning the following year, the ship became the guardship of the First Reserve in the Firth of Forth. Lord Warden was mobilised in 1878 when war with Russia seemed imminent during the Russo-Turkish War. She was paid off in 1885 and broken up in 1889.

== Design and description ==
Lord Warden was 280 feet (85.3 m) long between perpendiculars and had a beam of 59 feet (18.0 m). The ship had a draught of 23 feet 11 inches (7.3 m) forward and 27 feet 11 inches (8.5 m) aft. She displaced 7,842 long tons (7,968 t) and had a tonnage of 4,080 tons burthen.

Lord Warden had a low centre of gravity which meant that she rolled very badly; she was said to be second only to her sister as the worst roller in the Victorian fleet. This characteristic was so dramatic that when the rolling propensities of ships were compared, it was usual to say "as bad a roller as the Prince Consort", the Lord Clydes being beyond compare. In sea trials in 1867 with Bellerophon, Lord Warden was taking water through her gun ports, while Bellerophon could have fought her main armament in safety. She was, however, very handy and sailed well in all weathers under sail or steam. Her crew consisted of 605 officers and ratings.

=== Propulsion ===
The ship had a single three-cylinder horizontal-return, connecting-rod steam engine, made by Maudslay, Sons and Field, that drove a single propeller using steam provided by nine rectangular boilers. The engine produced 6,706 indicated horsepower (5,001 kW) during sea trials on 13 September 1867 which gave Lord Warden a speed of 13.5 knots (25.0 km/h; 15.5 mph) under steam. The engine proved to be the most powerful and the most reliable ever placed in a wooden hull for the Royal Navy. She carried a maximum of 600 long tons (610 t) of coal.

Lord Warden was ship-rigged with three masts and had a sail area of 31,000 square feet (2,900 m^{2}). To reduce drag, the funnels were telescopic and could be lowered. Her best speed under sail alone was 10 knots (19 km/h; 12 mph), nearly the slowest of any British ironclad.

=== Armament ===
The ship was designed to carry an armament of 14 rifled muzzle-loading (RML) guns eight-inch and 2 RML seven-inch guns. Lord Warden was completed, however, with a pair of RML nine-inch guns, 14 RML eight-inch (200 mm) guns, and 2 RML seven-inch (178 mm) guns. The latter guns served as forward chase guns on the main deck where they were very wet and useless in a head sea. One of the nine-inch (229 mm) guns was the forward chase gun on the upper deck and the other became the stern chase gun on the main deck. A dozen of the eight-inch (203 mm) guns were mounted on the main deck on the broadside amidships and the remaining pair were positioned on the quarterdeck on the broadside.

The shell of the nine-inch gun weighed 254 pounds (115.2 kg) while the gun itself weighed 12 long tons (12 t). It had a muzzle velocity of 1,420 ft/s (430 m/s) and was rated with the ability to penetrate 11.3 inches (287 mm) of wrought-iron armour. The eight-inch gun weighed nine long tons (9.1 t); it fired a 175-pound (79.4 kg) shell at a muzzle velocity of 1,410 ft/s (430 m/s) and was credited with the ability to penetrate 9.6 inches (244 mm) of armour. The seven-inch gun weighed 6.5 long tons (6.6 t) and fired a 112-pound (50.8 kg) shell that was able penetrate 7.7-inch (196 mm) of armour.

=== Armour ===
The entire side of Lord Warden's hull, except for the side of the upper deck, was protected by wrought-iron armour that tapered from 4.5 inches (114 mm) at the ends to 5.5 inches (140 mm) amidships. It extended 6 feet (1.8 m) below the waterline. The forward chase guns on the upper deck were protected by 4.5-inch armour plates on the sides of the hull and a 4.5-inch transverse bulkhead to their rear protected them from raking fire. The armour was backed by 30 inches (762 mm) of oak and the 1.5 inches (38 mm) iron skin of the ship.

== Construction and service ==
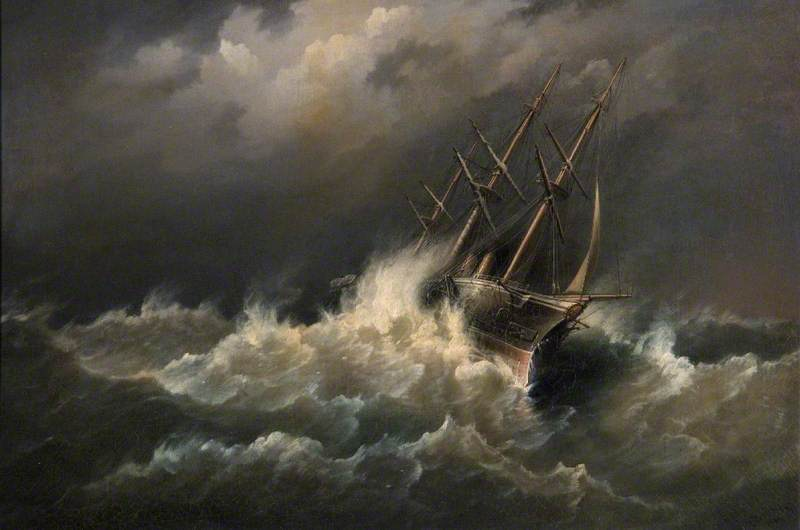
Lord Warden in the North Sea on passage from Queensferry to Portsmouth

Lord Warden, named after the position of the Lord Warden of the Cinque Ports, was ordered on 25 May 1863 from Chatham Naval Dockyard. She was laid down on 24 December 1863, and launched on 27 May 1865. The ship was commissioned in July 1867 to run her sea trials and completed on 30 August, for the cost of £328,998, or £322,843, exclusive of armament.

After a few months service with the Channel Squadron, Lord Warden was posted to the Mediterranean. On 30 January 1868, the wooden steam frigate HMS Endymion was caught by a squall whilst taking up her berth in Valletta Harbour, Malta. She collided with the Ottoman ironclad Mahmoudiah, knocking off her bowsprit and then collided with Lord Warden, damaging some of the latter's boats and an accommodation ladder. Endymion was reported to be undamaged. On 3 May, she ran aground in the Mediterranean. Repairs cost £2,409. A lieutenant was severely reprimanded and lost a year's seniority. Lord Warden relieved HMS Caledonia as the squadron flagship in 1869 and served in this position until 1875. In March 1872, Lord Clyde ran aground herself whilst attempting to rescue a British steamship that had gone aground off the island of Pantellaria. Attempts to lighten Lord Clyde enough to float her off were futile, but Lord Warden was able to pull the ship free and tow her to Malta for repair.

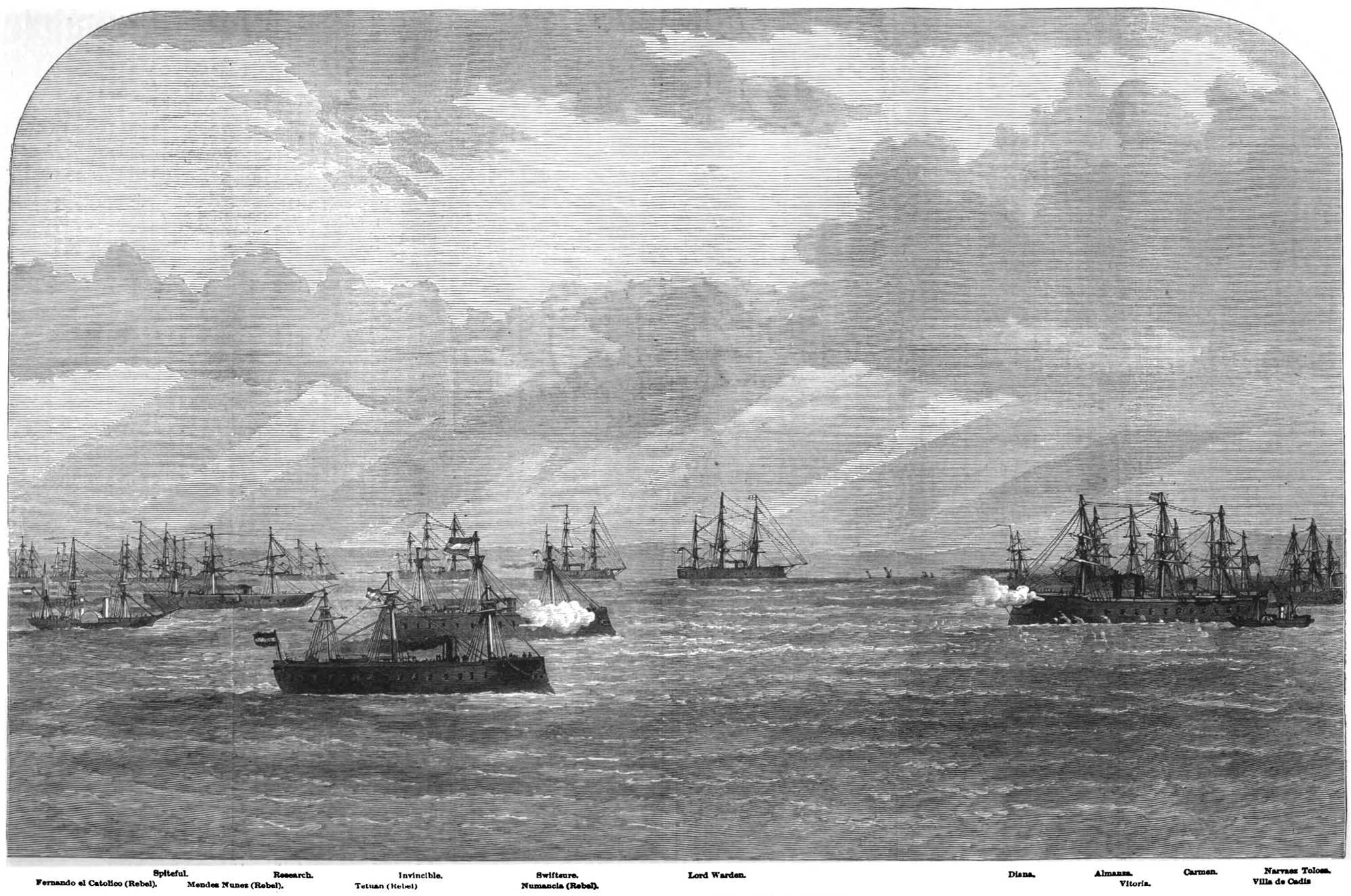
At the Battle of Escombrera in 1873

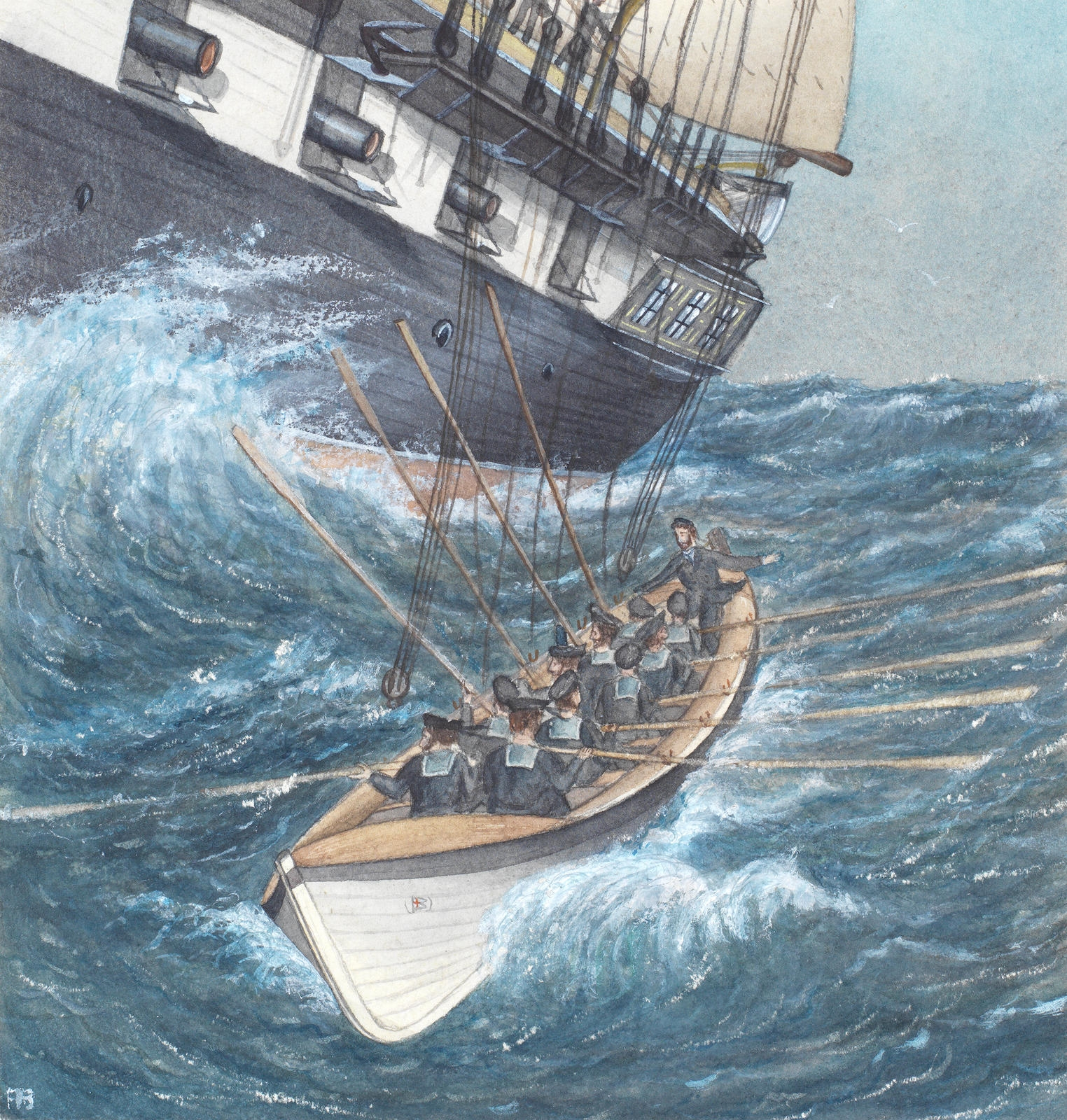
Lord Warden off Pantellaria, 1875; Man Overboard, away life-boat

In 1875, she returned to the UK for a refit that lasted until the following year.

Upon recommissioning, Lord Warden was assigned to the First Reserve, where she served as a guardship in the Firth of Forth. In this role, she went on annual summer cruises to various ports. During the Russo-Turkish War, she was mobilised and assigned to the Particular Service Squadron formed from all of the ships of the First Reserve, due to concerns that the victorious Russians might be about to attack Constantinople, forcing Great Britain to intervene, but nothing transpired and the ship returned to the Forth after making her summer cruise to Ireland and participating in a fleet review of the Particular Service Squadron by Queen Victoria on 13 August 1878. Lord Warden was equipped in 1884 with torpedo launchers and torpedo nets before the ship was paid off the following year with her crew being transferred en masse to HMS Devastation. She was broken up in 1889.
