= HMS Lord Clyde =

British lead ship of Lord Clyde

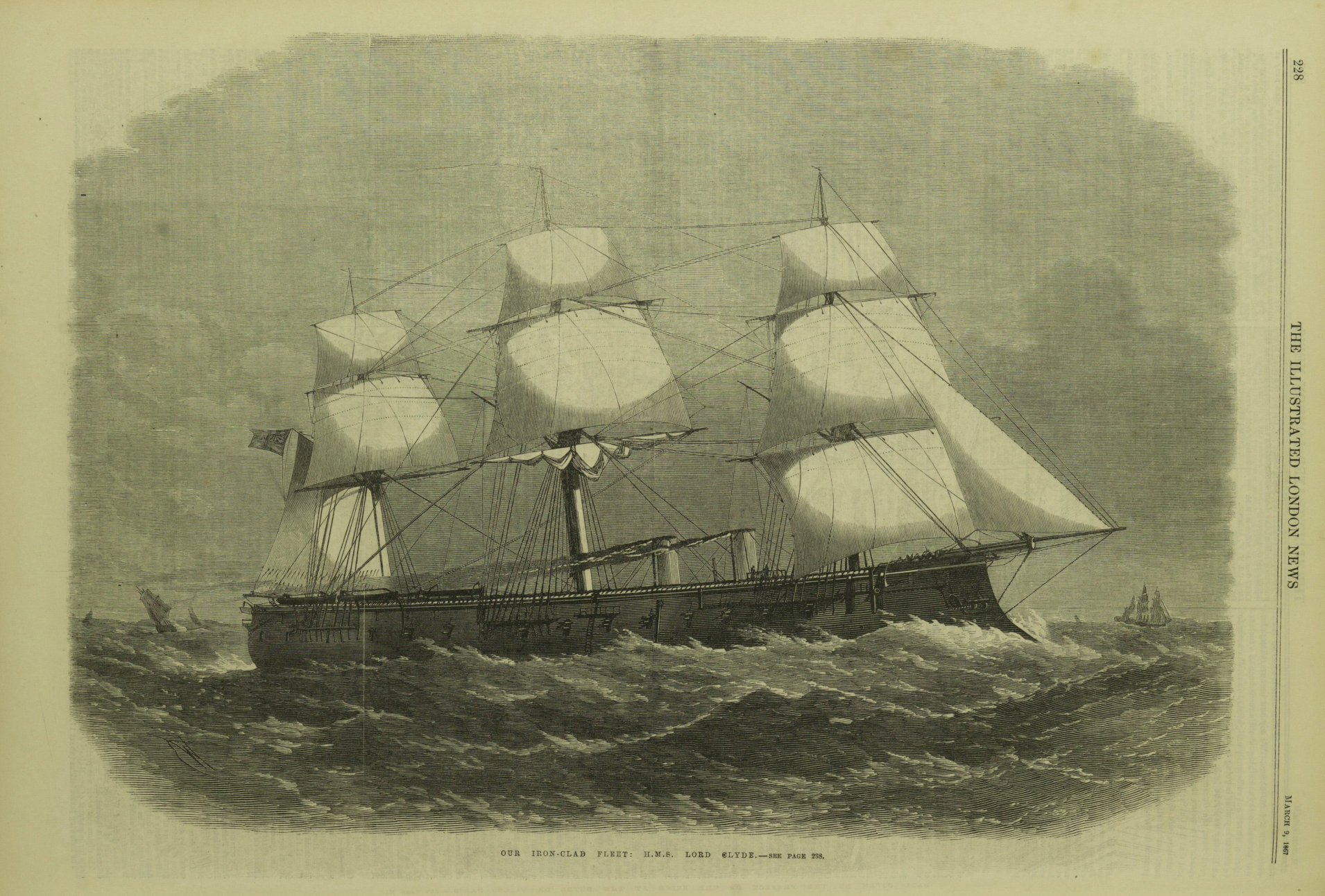
- Lord Clyde in 1867

History

United Kingdom
- Name: Lord Clyde
- Namesake: Field Marshal Colin Campbell, 1st Baron Clyde
- Ordered: 3 July 1863
- Builder: Pembroke Naval Dockyard
- Laid down: 29 September 1863
- Launched: 13 October 1864
- Completed: 15 September 1866
- Commissioned: June 1866
- Decommissioned: 1872
- Fate: Sold for scrap, 1875

General characteristics (as completed)
- Class & type: Lord Clyde-class armoured frigate
- Displacement: 7,842 long tons (7,968 t)
- Tons burthen: 4,067 (bm)
- Length: 280 ft (85.3 m) (p/p)
- Beam: 59 ft (18 m)
- Draught: 27 ft 11 in (8.5 m)
- Installed power: 9 rectangular boilers; 6,700 ihp (5,000 kW)
- Propulsion: 1 shaft; 1 horizontal return connecting rod-steam engine
- Sail plan: Ship rig
- Speed: 13 knots (24 km/h; 15 mph)
- Complement: 605
- Armament: 2 × 9 in (229 mm) |rifled muzzle-loading (RML) guns; 14 × 8 in (203 mm) RML guns; 2 × 7 in (180 mm) RML guns

HMS Lord Clyde was the name ship of the wooden-hulled Lord Clyde class of two armoured frigates (Note: Ironclad is the all-encompassing term for armoured warships of this period.) built for the Royal Navy (RN) during the 1860s. She and her sister ship, Lord Warden, were the heaviest wooden ships ever built and were also the fastest steaming wooden ships in the RN. Lord Clyde was initially assigned to the Channel Fleet in 1866, but was transferred to the Mediterranean Fleet in 1868. The ship suffered engine problems throughout her career and it needed to be replaced after only two years of service. She rejoined the Mediterranean Fleet in 1871, but was badly damaged when she ran aground the next year. When Lord Clyde was under repair, her hull was found to be rotten and she was sold for scrap in 1875.

== Design and description ==
HMS Lord Clyde was 280 feet (85.3 m) long between perpendiculars and had a beam of 58 feet 11 inches (18.0 m). The ship had a draught of 23 feet 9 inches (7.2 m) forward and 27 feet 2 inches (8.3 m) aft. She displaced 7,842 long tons (7,968 t) and had a tonnage of 4,067 tons burthen.

Lord Clyde had a very low centre of gravity which meant that she rolled very badly; she was said to be the worst roller in the Victorian fleet. This characteristic was so dramatic that when the rolling propensities of ships were compared, it was usual to say "as bad a roller as the Prince Consort", the Lord Clydes being beyond compare. Lord Clyde generally performed worse than did her sister ship, Lord Warden. In sea trials in 1867 with Bellerophon, Lord Clyde was rolling her gun ports under, while Bellerophon could have fought her main armament in safety. She was, however, very handy and sailed well in all weathers under sail or steam; her first captain reported that she was "as handy as a frigate". Her crew consisted of 605 officers and ratings.

=== Propulsion ===
The ship had a single two-cylinder trunk steam engine, made by Ravenhill and Hodgson, that drove a single propeller using steam provided by nine rectangular boilers. The engine, the largest and most powerful yet built, produced 6,064 indicated horsepower (4,522 kW) which gave Lord Clyde a speed of 13.4 knots (24.8 km/h; 15.4 mph) under steam. The severe vibration of the engine, coupled with the flexibility of the wooden hull, caused major problems during the ship's career. After only two years, the engine was worn out and everything but the condensers and shafting had to be replaced. She carried a maximum of 600 long tons (610 t) of coal.

Lord Clyde was ship-rigged with three masts and had a sail area of 31,000 square feet (2,900 m^{2}). To reduce drag, the funnels were telescopic and could be lowered. Her best speed under sail alone was 10.5 knots (19.4 km/h; 12.1 mph), nearly the slowest of any British ironclad. The ship holds "the double record of being the largest ship of any type or of any nationality ever to enter Plymouth Sound or Spithead on sail alone".

=== Armament ===
The ship was initially armed with 24 seven-inch rifled muzzle-loading (RML) guns. Four pairs of guns were positioned as fore and aft chase guns on the upper and main decks. The remaining 16 guns were mounted on the broadside amidships. The seven-inch (178 mm) gun weighed 6.5 long tons (6.6 t) and fired a 112-pound (50.8 kg) shell that was able penetrate 7.7-inch (196 mm) of armour.

Lord Clyde's original armament was replaced during her 1870 refit with a pair of RML nine-inch guns and 14 RML eight-inch guns; she only retained a pair of her original seven-inch guns. The latter guns remained in position as forward chase guns on the main deck; one of the nine-inch (229 mm) guns became the chase gun on the upper deck and the other replaced the pair of seven-inch aft chase guns on the main deck. Also on the upper deck were a pair of eight-inch (203 mm) guns on the broadside and the remaining 12 eight-inch guns were mounted on the main deck on the broadside amidships.

The shell of the nine-inch gun weighed 254 pounds (115.2 kg) while the gun itself weighed 12 long tons (12 t). It had a muzzle velocity of 1,420 ft/s (430 m/s) and was rated with the ability to penetrate 11.3 inches (287 mm) of wrought-iron armour. The eight-inch gun weighed nine long tons (9.1 t); it fired a 175-pound (79.4 kg) shell at a muzzle velocity of 1,410 ft/s (430 m/s) and was credited with the ability to penetrate 9.6 inches (244 mm) of armour.

=== Armour ===
The entire side of Lord Clyde's hull, except for the side of the upper deck, was protected by wrought-iron armour that tapered from 4.5 inches (114 mm) at the ends to 5.5 inches (140 mm) amidships. It extended 6 feet (1.8 m) below the waterline. The forward chase guns on the upper deck were protected by 4.5-inch armour plates on the sides of the hull and a 4.5-inch transverse bulkhead to their rear protected them from raking fire. The armour was backed by 30 inches (762 mm) of oak and the 1.5 inches (38 mm) iron skin of the ship.

== Construction and service ==
Lord Clyde, named after the recently deceased Field Marshal Colin Campbell, 1st Baron Clyde, was ordered on 3 July 1863 from Pembroke Naval Dockyard. She was laid down on 29 September 1863 and launched on 13 October 1864. The ship was commissioned in June 1866 to run her sea trials and completed on 15 September, for the cost of £285,750 or £294,481, exclusive of armament.

Commanded by Captain Roderick Dew, the ship was initially assigned to the Channel Fleet where she spent three months as temporary flagship before she was transferred to the Mediterranean in 1868. Lord Clyde made one cruise with the Mediterranean Fleet during which she fractured her steel mainyard in a squall. Her engines continued to deteriorate and they were condemned as no longer safe to use by the fleet engineer when she arrived in Naples. The ship was sent to the Malta Dockyard under sail for repair, but they could only make temporary repairs that would enable her to reach home.

Upon arrival at Plymouth, Lord Clyde was paid off and a new engine was built for her at Devonport Dockyard. In addition, her four-bladed propeller was replaced by a lighter, two-bladed propeller with less drag and the ship was rearmed. She remained in reserve until 1871 when she recommissioned under the command of Captain John Bythesea, an officer who had won the Victoria Cross during the Crimean War of 1854–1855. Lord Clyde rejoined the Mediterranean Fleet.

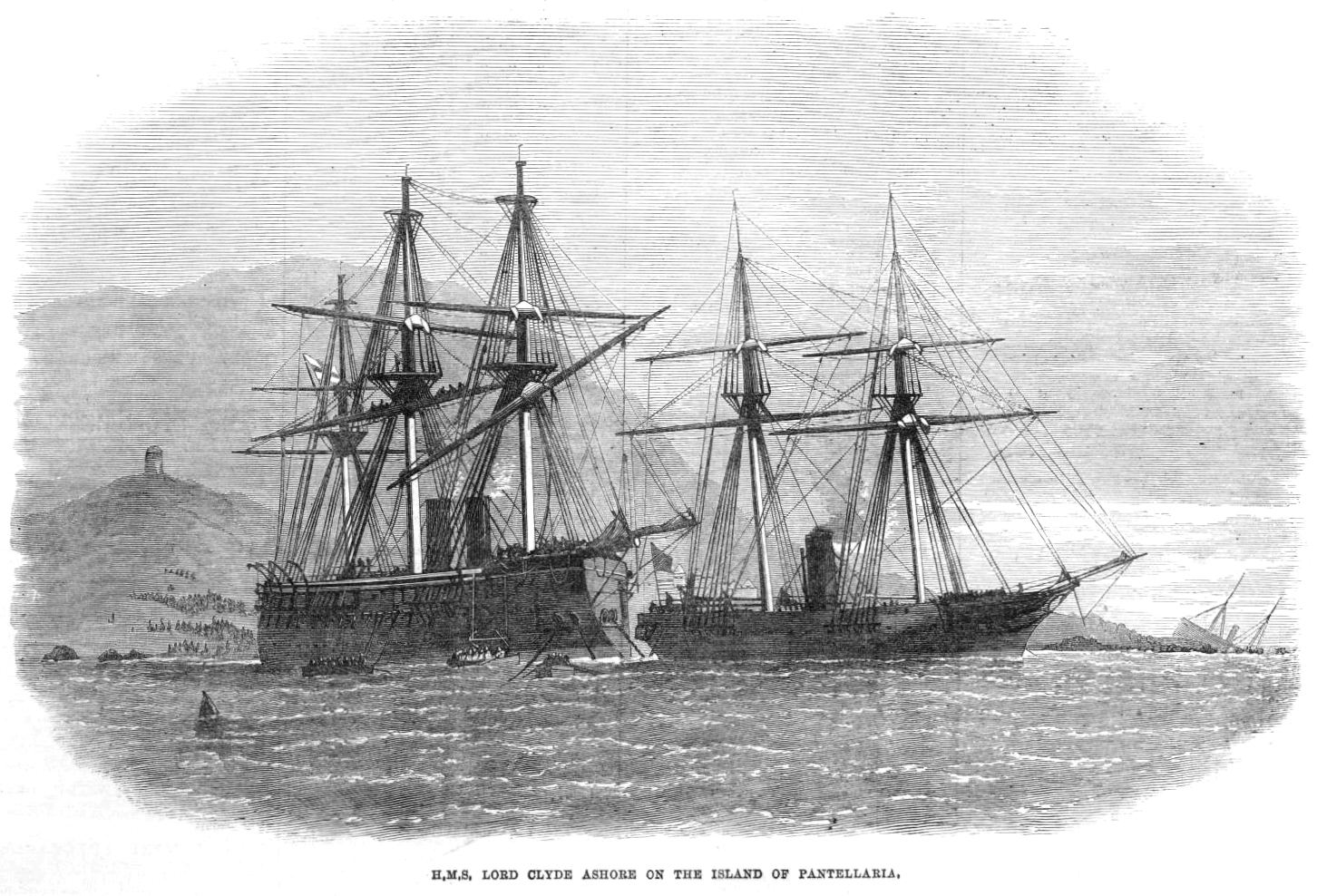
The Lord Clyde ashore on the Island of Pantellaria, shows the Turkish screw-steamer Babel, which rendered assistance in laying out a bower anchor for the Lord Clyde to heave off with. The Raby Castle is seen lying beyond the rocks. Illustrated London News 1872

On 14 March 1872, she ran aground herself whilst attempting to rescue the British steamship Raby Castle that had gone aground off the island of Pantellaria, Italy. The Lord Warden and several lighters were sent to her assistance. Attempts to lighten the ship enough to float her off were futile and she remained stuck fast taking damage from wave action that strained her back and wrenched off her sternpost, rudder post and rudder. Lord Warden was able to pull her off four days later and tow her to be repaired at Malta where the dockyard estimated repairs would take six months. Bythesea and his navigator were convicted during their court-martial and neither ever served at sea again.

The Admiralty ordered that Lord Clyde be only repaired enough to allow for a passage home; that required six months of work at a cost of £417, and the ship was escorted back to Plymouth by the ironclad Defence. She was again paid off upon arrival and her engines and boilers were removed to allow for her hull to be thoroughly inspected. The dockworkers found that her entire hull was colonized by a fungus, partly because unseasoned wood had been used in the ship's construction, and they spent the next three years attempting to kill the fungus and stop the continuing deterioration. All efforts failed and Lord Clyde was sold for scrap before she lost all value in 1875 for £3,730.
