= Lord Clyde-class ironclad =

1860s class of Royal Navy ironclads

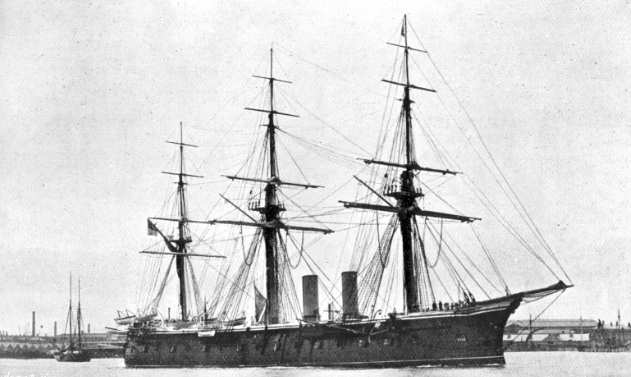
- Lord Warden, second and last ship of the class

Class overview
- Builders: Chatham Dockyard; Pembroke Dockyard
- Operators: Royal Navy
- Built: 1863–1867
- In commission: 1866–1889
- Completed: 2
- Scrapped: 2

General characteristics
- Displacement: Lord Warden : 7,940 long tons (8,070 t); Lord Clyde : 7,942 long tons (8,069 t)
- Length: 280 ft (85 m)
- Beam: 59 ft (18 m)
- Draught: 27 ft 11 in (8.5 m)
- Installed power: 9 rectangular boilers; 6,700 ihp (5,000 kW)
- Propulsion: 1 shaft; 1 steam engine
- Sail plan: Ship rig
- Speed: 13 knots (24 km/h; 15 mph) under power; 10 knots (19 km/h; 12 mph) under sail
- Complement: 605
- Armament: 2 (Note: Lord Warden and Lord Clyde after 1870) × 9 in (229 mm) rifled muzzle-loading (RML) guns; 14 × 8 in (203 mm) RML guns; 2 or 24 (Note: Lord Clyde as built) × 7 in (180 mm) RML guns
- Armour: Battery and belt: 5.5 in (140 mm) amidships, 4.5 in (114 mm) fore and aft; Backing: 30 in (760 mm) of oak

The Lord Clyde-class ironclads were a pair of wooden-hulled armoured frigates built for the Royal Navy in the 1860s. They were designed by Edward Reed and built to make use of the large stocks of seasoned timber available in the royal shipyards. The ships hold a number of records for the Navy, including being the largest wooden-hulled warships, having the most powerful engines in a wooden ship, and having the worst rolls in the fleet. The lead ship, Lord Clyde, initially had a main armament of 7 in (180 mm) rifled muzzle-loading (RML) guns and had a short career that was curtailed by problems with her engine and deterioration of her hull due to the use of unseasoned timber. The second ship of the class, Lord Warden, armed with a mixture of 7 in, 8 in (203 mm) and 9 in (229 mm) RML guns, served as the flagship of the Mediterranean Fleet and was mobilised during the Russo-Turkish War, although she did not see active service.

== Design and description ==
The Lord Clyde class were ironclad frigates constructed for the Royal Navy in the 1860s. Unlike other similar ironclad ships that were built for the navy at the time, they were not conversions but new wooden hulls that were encased in iron. Designed by Edward Reed, they were built to use up the stocks of timber at the Chatham and Pembroke Dockyards. The class consisted of two ships, the first named Lord Clyde after Field Marshal Colin Campbell, 1st Baron Clyde, and the second Lord Warden after the position of the Lord Warden of the Cinque Ports. They were the largest and fastest steaming wooden ships ever built.

The Lord Clyde class were 280 feet (85.3 m) long between perpendiculars and had a beam of 58 feet 11 inches (18.0 m). The ships had a draught of 23 feet 9 inches (7.2 m) forward and 27 feet 2 inches (8.3 m) aft. Lord Clyde displaced 7,842 long tons (7,968 t) and had a tonnage of 4,067 tons burthen. Lord Warden displaced 7,842 long tons (7,968 t) and had a tonnage of 4,080 tons burthen. The ships' complement consisted of 605 officers and ratings.

=== Propulsion ===
The ships were equipped with different engines, each driving a single propeller. Lord Clyde was powered by a single two-cylinder trunk steam engine that was made by Ravenhill and Hodgson while Maudslay, Sons and Field provided a three-cylinder return connecting rod engine for Lord Warden. The three-cylinder engines were the largest engines to be mounted in a British wooden hull, and also proved to be the most reliable. The greater weight, alongside the addition of a poop deck, contributed to the greater displacement of the latter vessel. Steam was provided by nine rectangular boilers that ran at a pressure of 28 lb (13 kg). The ships were designed for a maximum speed of 13 knots (24 km/h; 15 mph). During trials, on 9 February 1867 in Stokes Bay, Lord Clyde achieved 13.4 knots (24.8 km/h; 15.4 mph) from 6,064 indicated horsepower (4,522 kW) at an engine speed of 64.8 rpm and, on 13 September near Plymouth, Lord Warden achieved 13.5 knots (25.0 km/h; 15.5 mph) from 6,706 indicated horsepower (5,001 kW) at an engine speed of 62.3 rpm. The ships carried a maximum of 600 long tons (610 t) of coal.

They were fully-rigged with three masts and had a sail area of 31,000 square feet (2,900 m^{2}). The mainmast was 85 ft (26 m) long with a diameter of 35 in (890 mm). The ships had a similar sail plan, the only difference being that Lord Warden lacked a jibboom. Their best speed under sail alone was 10.5 knots (19.4 km/h; 12.1 mph), one of the slowest of British ironclads.

Due to their very low centre of gravity, the ships suffered from poor stability, obvious in how much the ships rolled at sea. The issue was so pronounced that it was believed the ships were the least stable in the Victorian fleet, so much so that the flaw was incomparable to the poor stability other vessels. During trials, Lord Clyde's roll was so severe that her gun ports became temporarily inoperable and submerged by water while Bellerophon, which sailed with her, was able to use her guns without issue. However, the class was able to sell well regardless of the ships being under sail or steam.

=== Armament and armour ===
Lord Clyde was initially armed with twenty-four 7 in (178 mm) rifled muzzle-loading (RML) guns. Four pairs of guns were positioned as fore and aft chase guns on the upper and main decks. The remaining sixteen guns were mounted on the broadside amidships. Lord Warden was designed to carry an armament of fourteen 8 in (203 mm) and two 7 in RML guns. The ship was completed with two 9 in (229 mm), fourteen 8 in guns, and two 7 in RML guns. The last guns served as forward chase guns on the main deck where they were very wet and useless in a head sea. One of the 9 in guns was a forward chase gun on the upper deck and the other became the stern chase gun on the main deck. Twelve 8 in guns were mounted on the main deck on the broadside amidships and the remaining pair were positioned on the quarterdeck on the broadside. Lord Clyde's original armament was replaced during her 1870 refit with a similar fit. The ships were fitted with a pointed oak ram that was tipped with a bronze casing.

The shell of the 9 in gun weighed 254 pounds (115.2 kg) while the gun itself weighed 12 long tons (12 t). It had a muzzle velocity of 1,420 ft/s (430 m/s) and could penetrate 11.3 inches (287 mm) of wrought-iron armour. The 8 in gun weighed nine long tons (9.1 t); it fired a 175-pound (79.4 kg) shell at a muzzle velocity of 1,410 ft/s (430 m/s) and was credited with the ability to penetrate 9.6 inches (244 mm) of armour. The 7 in gun weighed 6.5 long tons (6.6 t) and fired a 112-pound (50.8 kg) shell that was able penetrate 7.7 inches (196 mm) of armour.

The entire side of each ship's hull, except for the side of the upper deck, was protected by wrought-iron armour that tapered from 4.5 inches (114 mm) at the ends to 5.5 inches (140 mm) amidships. It extended 6 feet (1.8 m) below the waterline. The forward chase guns on the upper deck were protected by 4.5-inch armour plates on the sides of the hull and a 4.5-inch transverse bulkhead to their rear protected them from raking fire. The armour was backed by 30 inches (762 mm) of oak and the 1.5-inch (38 mm) iron skin of the ship.

== Ships ==
Construction data
Ship	Builder	Laid down	Launched	Completed	Commissioned	Fate	Cost
Lord Clyde	Pembroke Dockyard	29 September 1863	15 September 1866	13 October 1864	June 1866	Sold to be broken up, 1875	£285,750 or £294,481
Lord Warden	Chatham Dockyard	24 December 1863	27 May 1865	30 August 1867	July 1867	Sold to be broken up, 1889	£328,998 or £322,843

== Service ==
On commissioning, the ships were initially assigned to the Channel Fleet where Lord Clyde spent three months as a temporary flagship. Lord Warden was transferred to the Mediterranean Fleet in 1867, Lord Clyde joining her one-year later. The latter made one cruise during which she fractured her steel mainyard in a squall.

The construction of Lord Clyde faced challenges due to a shortage of seasoned timber at Pembroke Dockyard, leading to the use of green timber. This, combined with the stress caused by the oscillating of her trunk engines, resulted in rapid wear to her engines. Upon reaching Naples, a fleet engineer deemed the engines unsafe, and the ship had to be sailed to the Malta Dockyard for temporary repairs. She returned to Plymouth. Upon being re-engined and rearmed, she remained in reserve until 1871 when she rejoined the Mediterranean Fleet.

On 30 January 1868, Lord Warden was damaged after she was struck by the wooden steam frigate HMS Endymion and then, on 3 May, she ran aground and had to be refloated. The ship served as flagship for the fleet between 1869 and 1875. On 14 March 1872, Lord Clyde ran aground whilst attempting to rescue a British steamship that was stranded off the island of Pantellaria. Lord Warden was able to pull her off four days later, but, on returning to Plymouth, naval investigators discovered that the unseasoned timber was infected with fungus and Lord Clyde was sold to be broken up. Lord Warden was later mobilised during the Russo-Turkish War and was assigned to the Particular Service Squadron but saw no service. In 1884, the ship was deemed in sufficiently good condition to be considered as a mount for the new Whitehead torpedo but the idea was dropped and instead she was decommissioned in 1885 and broken up in 1889.

== Bibliography ==
- Archibald, Edward H. H. (1971). The Metal Fighting Ship in the Royal Navy, 1860–1970. Blandford Press. ISBN 978-0-71370-551-5.
- Ballard, G. A. (1980). The Black Battlefleet. Naval Institute Press. ISBN 0-87021-924-3.
- Friedman, Norman (2018). British Battleships of the Victorian Era. Naval Institute Press. ISBN 978-1-68247-329-0.
- Parkes, Oscar (1990) [1957]. British Battleships. Naval Institute Press. ISBN 978-1-55750-075-5.
- Reed, E. J. (1869). Our Iron-Clad Ships: Their Qualities, Performance and Cost. John Murray. OCLC 7944535.
- Roberts, John (1979). "Great Britain (including Empire Forces)". In Chesneau, Roger & Kolesnik, Eugene M. (eds.). Conway's All the World's Fighting Ships 1860–1905. Mayflower Books. pp. 1–113. ISBN 978-0-83170-302-8.
- Silverstone, Paul H. (1984). Directory of the World's Capital Ships. Ian Allan. ISBN 978-0-71101-222-6.
- Sondhaus, Lawrence (2012). Naval Warfare, 1815–1914. Taylor and Francis. ISBN 978-0-20313-223-4.
