= List of breastwork monitors of the Royal Navy =

The breastwork monitor was developed during the 1860s by Sir Edward Reed, Chief Constructor of the Royal Navy, as an improvement of the basic monitor design developed by John Ericsson during the American Civil War. Reed gave these ships a superstructure to increase seaworthiness and raise the freeboard of the gun turrets so they could be worked in all weathers. The superstructure was armoured to protect the bases of the turrets, the funnels and the ventilator ducts in what he termed a breastwork. The ships were conceived as harbour defence ships with little need to leave port. This meant that they could dispense with the masts, sails and rigging needed to supplement their coal-fired steam engines over any distance. Reed took advantage of the lack of masts and designed the ships with one twin-gun turret at each end of the superstructure, each able to turn and fire in a 270° arc. These ships were described by Admiral George Alexander Ballard as being like "full-armoured knights riding on donkeys, easy to avoid but bad to close with". Reed later developed the design into the Devastation-class, the first ocean-going turret ships without masts, the direct ancestors of the pre-dreadnought battleships and the dreadnoughts.

Reed designed the first ship (HMVS Cerberus) at the request of the Colony of Victoria; the India Office then ordered another of the same design (HMS Magdala) as well as a less expensive version (HMS Abyssinia). The four Cyclops-class ships, enlarged versions of Cerberus, were ordered in 1870 for local defence of English ports.

HMS Glatton was derived from the design of the first breastwork monitors, but sacrificed the rear turret for thicker armour and larger guns with which to attack enemy ports. She was given a deep draught to improve her seaworthiness, but her low freeboard meant that she had very little ability to weather head seas. HMS Hotspur was similar in layout to Glatton, but she was given more freeboard by the addition of an unarmoured structure above her waterline armour belt. Designed as a ram, Hotspur was given a fixed turret with four gun ports as a rotating turret was not thought capable of withstanding the shock of impact. HMS Rupert was an enlarged version of Hotspur, but used a Glatton-type turret instead of the fixed turret and thicker armour than the older ship. The two Conqueror-class ships were enlarged versions of Rupert with heavier guns, thicker armour and a steel hull.

With the exception of Cerberus, all of these ships were sold off for scrap during the first decade of the 20th century. Cerberus was sold in 1924 and used as a breakwater; her wreck still exists off Half Moon Bay in Australia.

== Key ==
Main guns	The number and type of the main battery guns
Armour	Waterline belt thickness
Displacement	Ship displacement
Propulsion	Number of shafts, type of propulsion system, and top speed generated
Service	The dates work began and finished on the ship and its ultimate fate
Laid down	The date the keel began to be assembled
Commissioned	The date the ship was commissioned or completed

== Cerberus class ==
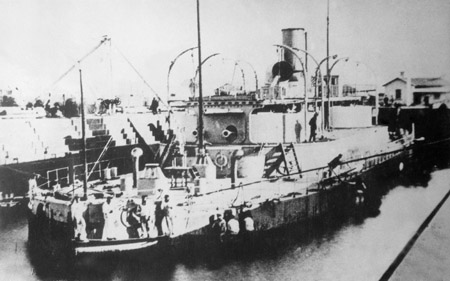
HMVS Cerberus in drydock in Williamstown, Victoria in 1871

The two Cerberus-class ships were the first breastwork monitors to be built. Cerberus was ordered in 1866 by the Colony of Victoria to supplement the shore-based fortifications of Port Philip Bay and to defend the colony in the event of a Russian attack. The India Office ordered a sister ship to defend the approaches of Bombay. Magdala was rearmed with four 8-inch (203 mm) breech-loading guns in 1892 and Cerberus had a number of small quick-firing guns added to her superstructure for defence against torpedo boats.

Both ships were fitted with three temporary masts for their delivery voyages, although only Cerberus had her freeboard raised with the addition of temporary bulwarks. The ships spent the bulk of their service lives in reserve and rarely, if ever, left their home port. Magdala was sold in January 1903, but Cerberus was hulked in 1900 and transferred to the Royal Australian Navy when it was formed in 1911. She was renamed HMAS Platypus II in 1918 and sold in 1924. Stripped of all salvageable material, she was scuttled in 1926 as a breakwater, and her remains are still visible today.

Ship	Main guns	Armour	Displacement	Propulsion	Service		
Ship	Main guns	Armour	Displacement	Propulsion	Laid down	Completed	Fate
HMVS Cerberus	4 × 10 in (254 mm) rifled muzzle loaders	8 inches (200 mm)	3,340 long tons (3,394 t)	2 screws, 2 steam engines, 10 kn (19 km/h; 12 mph)	1 September 1867	September 1870	Sold 24 June 1924
HMS Magdala	4 × 10 in (254 mm) rifled muzzle loaders	8 inches (200 mm)	3,340 long tons (3,394 t)	2 screws, 2 steam engines, 10 kn (19 km/h; 12 mph)	6 October 1868	November 1870	Sold January 1903

== HMS Abyssinia ==
HMS Abyssinia was a smaller and cheaper version of Cerberus designed by the Dudgeon shipyard when the India Office ran out of money after it ordered HMS Magdala. She was intended as a partner for the larger ship in the defence of Bombay and had the same armament but one less inch of armour, and she was one knot slower. The ship was rearmed with eight-inch breech-loading guns in 1892 before being sold for scrap in 1903.

Ship	Main guns	Armour	Displacement	Propulsion	Service		
Ship	Main guns	Armour	Displacement	Propulsion	Laid down	Completed	Fate
HMS Abyssinia	4 × 10-inch (250 mm) rifled muzzle loaders	7 inches (178 mm)	2,901 long tons (2,948 t)	2 screws, 2 steam engines, 9 kn (17 km/h; 10 mph)	23 March 1868	October 1870	Sold 1903

== HMS Glatton ==
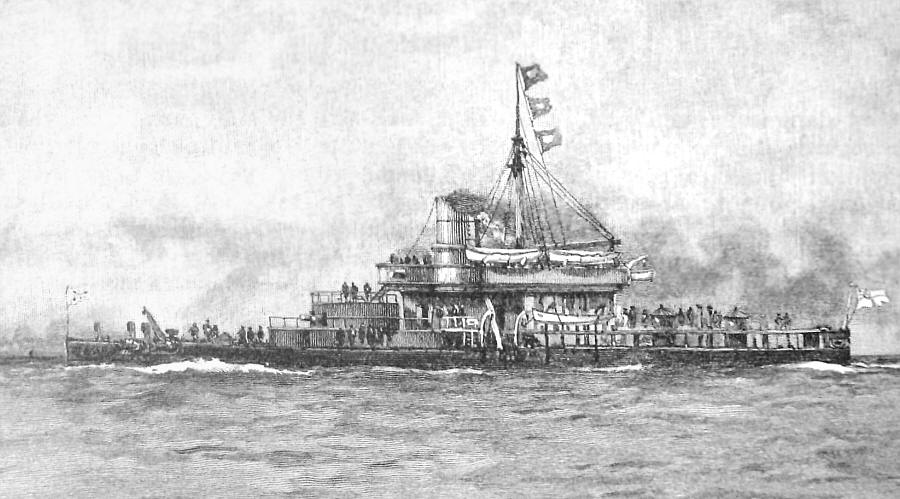
Engraving of HMS Glatton

The design of HMS Glatton was also derived from that of Cerberus, although she exchanged one turret for heavier guns and armour. She was given a deeper draught for better seakeeping abilities, but retained the low freeboard of the older ships to make her a smaller target, making it difficult to weather head seas in heavy weather. Nominally intended for coast defence, she was designed to attack the defences of deep-water ports like Brest and Cherbourg.

Glatton was immediately assigned as tender to HMS Excellent upon completion and remained in Portsmouth for the bulk of her career. She participated in a gunnery trial in 1872 where HMS Hotspur fired on her turret at a range of 200 yards (180 m). Neither of the 12-inch (305 mm) shells that hit her turret penetrated although some rivets were dislodged. She was mobilised in 1878 for service with the Particular Service Squadron. In 1881 she received 14-inch (356 mm) torpedo launchers as well as three small quick-firing guns for use against torpedo boats later in the decade. Glatton participated in the 1887 fleet manoeuvres, but she returned to reserve afterwards. She was sold in 1903 for breaking-up.

Ship	Main guns	Armour	Displacement	Propulsion	Service		
Ship	Main guns	Armour	Displacement	Propulsion	Laid down	Completed	Fate
HMS Glatton	2 × 12-inch (300 mm) rifled muzzle loaders	12 inches	4,912 long tons (4,991 t)	2 screws, 2 steam engines, 12 kn (22 km/h; 14 mph)	10 August 1868	24 February 1872	Sold 1903

== HMS Hotspur ==
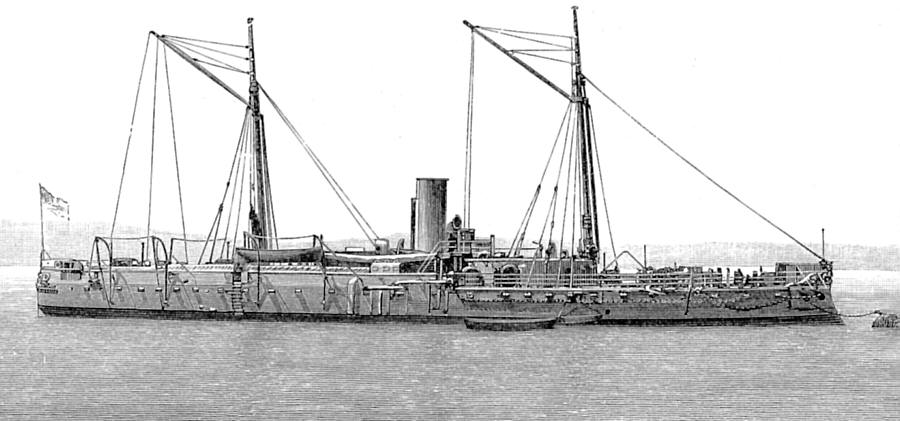
Engraving of HMS Hotspur, showing the turret between the foremast and the funnel

HMS Hotspur was inspired by a series of French coast-defence ships with the ram as their primary weapon. The layout of Glatton was modified with a fixed turret and her freeboard was increased over that of the older ship. The single 12-inch gun was mounted on a turntable and could pivot at each gun port to maximise its arc of fire. It was nominally capable of firing forward, but this proved to damage the upper deck.

Hotspur remained in reserve until 1876 after she was commissioned. She served with HMS Rupert in the Sea of Marmara during the Russo-Turkish War of 1878. Hotspur was reconstructed between 1881 and 1883 with the substitution of a new turret with two 12-inch guns protected by the newly developed compound armour. The ship's breastwork was removed and replaced by side armour with transverse armoured bulkheads to form an armoured citadel. Her only active service thereafter was with the Particular Service Squadron of 1885. She was guard ship at Holyhead until 1893, then in reserve again until 1897, and then relieved HMS Scorpion as guard ship at Bermuda. Hotspur remained there until sold in August 1904.

Ship	Main guns	Armour	Displacement	Propulsion	Service		
Ship	Main guns	Armour	Displacement	Propulsion	Laid down	Completed	Fate
HMS Hotspur	1 × 12-inch (305 mm) rifled muzzle loader	11 inches (279 mm)	4,331 long tons (4,400 t)	2 screws, 2 steam engines, 12 knots (22 km/h; 14 mph)	2 October 1868	17 November 1871	Sold August 1904

== HMS Rupert ==
HMS Rupert was an enlarged version of Hotspur with a rotating turret, two smaller guns, and heavier armour. Her machinery was unsatisfactory and she could only make 12 knots rather than her designed 14 knots (26 km/h; 16 mph). The ship was comprehensively reconstructed in 1891–93 when her old muzzle-loading guns were replaced by breech-loading 9.2-inch (234 mm) guns, her machinery was replaced and a number of light quick-firing guns were added for torpedo boat defence.

Rupert was sent to the Mediterranean after she was commissioned and served there from 1876 to 1880. She was thereafter held in reserve at Portsmouth until being mobilised for the Particular Service Squadron during the Russian war scare from April to August 1885. She was then assigned as guard ship at Hull until 1890. After reconstruction she became guard ship at Pembroke Dock until 1895, then at Gibraltar between 1895 and 1902, then relieved Hotspur as guard ship at Bermuda until her sale in 1907.

Ship	Main guns	Armour	Displacement	Propulsion	Service		
Ship	Main guns	Armour	Displacement	Propulsion	Laid down	Completed	Fate
HMS Rupert	2 × 10-inch (254 mm) rifled muzzle loaders	11 inches (280 mm)	5,440 long tons (5,527 t)	2 screws, 2 steam engines, 12 kn (22 km/h; 14 mph)	6 June 1870	1 July 1874	Sold 1907

== Cyclops class ==
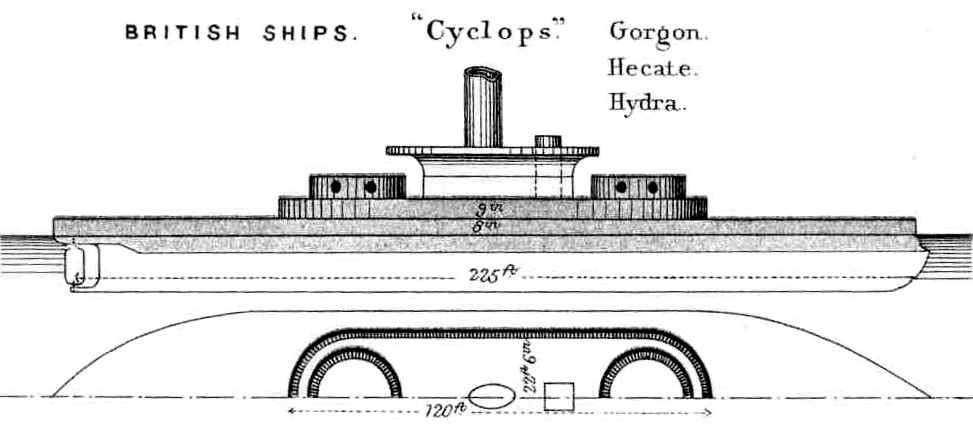
Right elevation plan from Brassey's Naval Annual 1888–1889

The Cyclops-class ships were slightly larger versions of Cerberus, and one knot faster. They were ordered to satisfy demands for local defence during the war scare of 1870. They were ostensibly for coast defence purposes, but the Admiralty planned to use them to attack enemy ports and for operations in the shallow waters of the Baltic Sea. The pace of construction was initially quite fast, but the fitting-out work slowed drastically as the threat of war declined. The ships spent most of their careers in reserve and were sold off in 1903.

Ship	Main guns	Armour	Displacement	Propulsion	Service		
Ship	Main guns	Armour	Displacement	Propulsion	Laid down	Completed	Fate
HMS Cyclops	4 × 10-inch rifled muzzle loaders	8 inches (200 mm)	3,480 long tons (3,536 t)	2 screws, 2 steam engines, 11 kn (20 km/h; 13 mph)	10 September 1870	4 May 1877	Sold 7 July 1903
HMS Gorgon	4 × 10-inch rifled muzzle loaders	8 inches (200 mm)	3,480 long tons (3,536 t)	2 screws, 2 steam engines, 11 kn (20 km/h; 13 mph)	5 September 1870	19 March 1874	Sold 12 May 1903
HMS Hecate	4 × 10-inch rifled muzzle loaders	8 inches (200 mm)	3,480 long tons (3,536 t)	2 screws, 2 steam engines, 11 kn (20 km/h; 13 mph)	5 September 1870	24 May 1877	Sold 12 May 1903
HMS Hydra	4 × 10-inch rifled muzzle loaders	8 inches (200 mm)	3,480 long tons (3,536 t)	2 screws, 2 steam engines, 11 kn (20 km/h; 13 mph)	5 September 1870	31 May 1876	Sold 7 July 1903

== Conqueror class ==
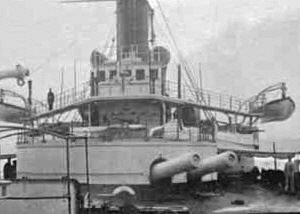
Gun turret and superstructure of HMS Conqueror, viewed from the bow

The Conqueror-class monitors were enlarged versions of HMS Rupert with improvements based on suggestions from one of Rupert's captains. The useless foremast was removed, and breech-loading guns and heavier compound armour were added. The rear superstructure was enlarged to better accommodate the crew and secondary armament. Six 14-inch torpedo tubes were fitted above water.

Both ships were assigned as tenders to the gunnery schools in Devonport and Portsmouth, although Conqueror did participate in Queen Victoria's Golden Jubilee Fleet review in July 1887. Each ship remained in reserve except to participate in the annual fleet manoeuvres, although this ceased after 1894. Conqueror was placed in reserve in 1902 and sold in April 1907. Hero became a target ship in November 1907 and was sunk in February 1908.

Ship	Main guns	Armour	Displacement	Propulsion	Service		
Ship	Main guns	Armour	Displacement	Propulsion	Laid down	Completed	Fate
HMS Conqueror	2 × 12-inch breech loaders	12 inches	6,200–6,440 long tons (6,299–6,543 t)	2 screws, 2 steam engines, 14 kn (26 km/h; 16 mph)	24 April 1879	March 1886	Sold April 1907
HMS Hero	2 × 12-inch breech loaders	12 inches	6,200–6,440 long tons (6,299–6,543 t)	2 screws, 2 steam engines, 14 kn (26 km/h; 16 mph)	11 April 1884	May 1888	Sunk as target 18 February 1908

== See also ==
- List of ironclads
- List of ironclads of the Royal Navy
