= List of ironclads of the Royal Navy =

This is a list of ironclads of the Royal Navy of the United Kingdom. An ironclad was a steam-propelled warship in the early part of the second half of the 19th century, protected by iron or steel armour plates.

The term battleship was not used by the Admiralty until the early 1880s, with the construction of the Colossus class. Prior to this point, a wide range of descriptions were used.

While the introduction of the ironclad is clear-cut, the boundary between 'ironclad' and the later 'pre-dreadnought battleship' is less obvious, as the characteristics of the pre-dreadnought evolved. For the sake of this article, the Royal Sovereign-class are treated as the first pre-dreadnoughts on account of their high freeboard and mixed battery of guns.

== Glossary ==
- BU = broken up

=== Sea-going ironclads (1860–1888) ===
- Warrior-class broadside ironclads
  - Warrior (1860) - Preserved Portsmouth
  - Black Prince (1861) - Renamed Emerald 1903, renamed Impregnable III 1910, sold for BU 1923
- Defence-class broadside ironclads
  - Defence (1861) - Renamed Indus 1898; hulked 1922; sold for BU 1935
  - Resistance (1861) - Sold 1898; foundered 1899; raised and BU
- Hector-class broadside ironclads
  - Hector (1862) - Sold for BU 1905
  - Valiant (1863) - Renamed Indus 1898, Valiant (Old) 1916, and Valiant III 1919; became floating oil tank 1924; BU 1957
- Achilles (1863) broadside ironclad — Renamed Hibernia 1902, Egmont 1904, Egremont 1918, and Pembroke 1919; sold for BU 1925
- Minotaur-class broadside ironclads
  - Minotaur (1863) - Renamed Boscawen 1904, Ganges 1906, and Ganges II 1908; sold for BU 1922
  - Agincourt (1865) - Renamed Boscawen III 1904 and Ganges II 1906; became coal hulk C109 1908; sold for BU 1960
  - Northumberland (1866) - Renamed Acheron 1904; became coal hulk C 1909, renamed C68 1926; sold 1927; became hulk Stedmound, BU 1935
- Prince Consort-class broadside ironclads (converted from Bulwark class 2-deckers)
  - Prince Consort (1862) (ex-Triumph) - Sold for BU 1882
  - Caledonia (1862) - Sold for BU 1886
  - Ocean (1862) - Sold for BU 1882
- Royal Oak (1862) broadside ironclad (converted from Bulwark class 2-decker) - Laid up 1871; sold for BU 1885
- Royal Alfred (1864) central-battery ironclad (converted from Bulwark class 2-decker)- Sold for BU 1885
- Research (1863) central-battery ironclad — Sold for BU 1884
- Enterprise (1864) central-battery ironclad — Sold for BU 1886
- Favorite (1864) central-battery ironclad — Sold for BU 1886
- Zealous (1864) central-battery ironclad (converted from Bulwark class 2-decker) - Laid up 1875; sold for BU 1886
- Repulse (1868) central-battery ironclad (converted from Bulwark class 2-decker) - Sold for BU 1889
- Lord Clyde-class broadside ironclads
  - Lord Clyde (1864) - Sold for BU 1875
  - Lord Warden (1865) - BU 1889
- Pallas (1865) central-battery ironclad — Sold for BU 1886
- Bellerophon (1865) central-battery ironclad — Renamed Indus III 1904; sold for BU 1922
- Penelope (1867) central-battery ironclad — Hulked 1897; sold for BU 1912
- Hercules (1868) central-battery ironclad — Renamed Calcutta 1909 and Fisgard II 1915; sold for BU 1932
- Monarch (1868) masted turret-ship — Renamed Simoom 1904; sold for BU 1905
- Captain (1869) masted turret-ship - Foundered 1870
- Audacious-class central-battery ironclads
  - Audacious (1869) - Renamed Fisgard 1904 and Imperieuse 1914; sold for BU 1922
  - Invincible (1869) - Renamed Erebus 1904 and Fisgard II 1906; foundered under tow 1914
  - Iron Duke (1870) - Hulked 1900; sold for BU 1906
  - Vanguard (1870) - Sunk in collision 1875
- Swiftsure-class central-battery ironclads
  - Swiftsure (1870) - Hulked 1901; renamed Orontes 1904; sold for BU 1908
  - Triumph (1870) - Renamed Tenedos 1904, Indus IV 1912, and Algiers 1912; sold for BU 1921
- Sultan (1870) central-battery ironclad — Named Fisgard IV 1906-1931; sold for BU 1946
- Devastation-class mastless turret-ship
  - Devastation (1871) - Sold for BU 1908
  - Thunderer (1872) mastless turret-ship — Sold for BU 1909
- Alexandra (1875) central-battery ironclad — Sold for BU 1908
- Temeraire (1876) central-battery ironclad with barbettes — Renamed Indus II 1904 and Akbar 1915; sold for BU 1921
- Superb-class (intended for Ottoman Empire) central-battery ironclads
  - Superb (launched as Hamidieh, renamed) (1875) - Sold for BU 1906
  - (Ottoman Messudieh)
- Neptune (1874) (ex-Independencia) masted turret-ship — Sold for BU 1903
- Dreadnought (1875) mastless turret-ship — Sold for BU 1908
- Inflexible (1876) central citadel turret-ship — Sold for BU 1903
- Ajax-class central citadel turret-ships
  - Agamemnon (1879) - BU 1903
  - Ajax (1880) - Sold for BU 1904
- Colossus-class turret-ships
  - Colossus (1882) - Sold for BU 1908
  - Edinburgh (1882) - BU 1910
- Admiral-class mastless turret ships
  - Collingwood (1882)
  - Rodney (1884)
  - Howe (1885)
  - Camperdown (1885)
  - Anson (1886)
  - Benbow (1885)
- Victoria-class mastless turret ships
  - Victoria (1887)
  - Sans Pareil (1887)
- Trafalgar-class mastless turret ships
  - Trafalgar (1887)
  - Nile (1888)

=== Coastal service ironclads ===
- Royal Sovereign (1862) turret-ship (converted from Duke of Wellington class 3-decker) - Sold for BU 1885
- Prince Albert (1864) turret-ship — Sold for BU 1899
- Scorpion-class masted turret-ships
  - Scorpion (1863) - Sunk as target 1901; raised and sold for BU 1903; foundered en route scrapyard 1903
  - Wivern (1863) - Sold for BU 1922
- Cerberus-class turret-ships
  - Cerberus (1868) (Victoria) - Renamed Platypus II 1918; sunk as breakwater 1926
  - Magdala (1870) (India) - Sold for BU 1904
- Abyssinia (1870) (India) turret-ship — Sold for BU 1903
- Hotspur (1870) turret-ship — Sold for BU 1904
- Glatton (1871) turret-ship — Sold for BU 1903
- Cyclops-class turret-ships
  - Cyclops (1871) - Sold for BU 1903
  - Gorgon (1871) - Sold for BU 1903
  - Hecate (1871) - Sold for BU 1903
  - Hydra (1871) - Sold for BU 1903
- Rupert (1872) turret-ship — Sold for BU 1907
- Belleisle-class (intended for Ottoman Empire) central battery ships
  - Belleisle (launched as Peki-Shereef, renamed) (1876) -Sold for BU 1904
  - Orion (planned name: Boordhi-Zaffer) (1879) - Renamed Orontes 1909; sold for BU 1913
- Conqueror-class turret-ships
  - Conqueror (1881) - Sold for BU 1907
  - Hero (1885) - Sunk as target 1908; raised and BU

== See also ==
- List of ironclads
- List of breastwork monitors of the Royal Navy

== Sources ==
- Ballard, Admiral G.A. The Black Battlefleet, published Nautical Publications Co. and Society for Nautical Research, 1980. ISBN 0-245-53030-4
- Chesneau, Roger and Kolesnik, Eugene (Ed.) Conway's All the World's Fighting Ships 1860–1905. Conway Maritime Press, 1979. ISBN 0-8317-0302-4
- Gardiner, Robert (Ed.). Conway's All the World's Fighting Ships 1906–1921. Conway Maritime Press, 1985. ISBN 0-85177-245-5
- Gardiner, Robert; Chesneau, Roger, eds. (1980). Conway's All The World's Fighting Ships 1922–1946. London: Conway Maritime Press. ISBN 0-85177-146-7.
- Lyon, David and Winfield, Rif, The Sail and Steam Navy List, All the Ships of the Royal Navy 1815–1889, pub Chatham, 2004, ISBN 1-86176-032-9
- Parkes, Oscar British Battleships, first published Seeley, Service & Co., 1957, published United States Naval Institute Press, 1990. ISBN 1-55750-075-4
- Reed, Edward J Our Ironclad Ships, their Qualities, Performance and Cost. John Murray, 1869.
