= Breastwork =

Breastwork may mean:

1. Breastwork (fortification), a temporary military fortification
2. Breastwork monitor, a type of heavily armored Royal Navy warship
3. Breast implant, surgical alteration of the breast
