= HMS Gorgon (1871) =

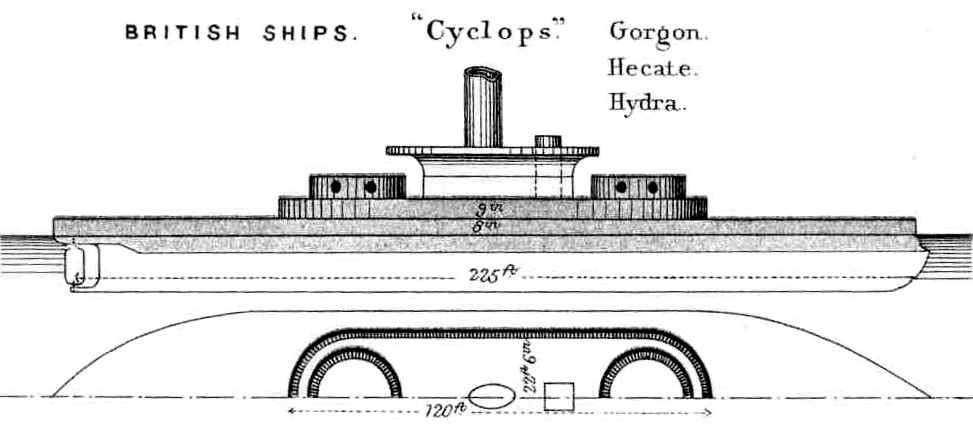
- Right elevation plan from Brassey's Naval Annual 1888–1889

History

United Kingdom
- Name: HMS Gorgon
- Namesake: Gorgon
- Builder: Palmers Shipbuilding, Jarrow
- Cost: £141,254
- Laid down: 5 September 1870
- Launched: 14 October 1871
- Completed: 19 March 1877
- Commissioned: April 1872
- Out of service: 1901
- Refit: 1888–89
- Fate: Sold for scrap 12 May 1903

General characteristics
- Class & type: Cyclops-class breastwork monitor
- Displacement: 3,480 long tons (3,540 t)
- Length: 225 ft (68.6 m) (p/p)
- Beam: 45 ft (13.7 m)
- Draught: 16 ft 3 in (5.0 m) (deep load)
- Installed power: 1,709 ihp (1,274 kW)
- Propulsion: 2 shafts, 2 direct-acting steam engines
- Speed: 11 knots (20 km/h; 13 mph)
- Range: 3,000 nmi (5,600 km; 3,500 mi) at 10 kn (19 km/h; 12 mph)
- Complement: 156
- Armament: 2 × twin 10-inch rifled muzzle loaders
- Armour: Belt: 6–8 in (152–203 mm); Deck: 1.5 in (38 mm); Superstructure: 8–9 in (203–229 mm); Conning tower: 8–9 in (203–229 mm); Gun turret: 9–10 in (229–254 mm)

HMS Gorgon was the first ship commissioned of the four Cyclops-class breastwork monitors built for the Royal Navy during the 1870s.

== Design and description ==
The Cyclops-class ships were modified versions of the Cerberus class. The ships had a length between perpendiculars of 225 feet (68.6 m), a beam of 45 feet (13.7 m), and a draught of 16 feet 3 inches (4.95 m) at deep load. They displaced 3,480 long tons (3,540 t). Their crew consisted of 156 officers and men. Gorgon had two 4-cylinder horizontal direct-acting steam engine, each driving a single propeller shaft. The engines produced a total of 1,670 indicated horsepower (1,250 kW) during the ship's sea trials which gave her a maximum speed of 11 knots (20 km/h; 13 mph). They carried 250 long tons (250 t) of coal, enough to steam 3,000 nautical miles (5,600 km; 3,500 mi) at 10 knots (19 km/h; 12 mph).

The ships mounted four 10-inch rifled muzzle-loading guns in twin-gun turrets fore and aft of the superstructure. The guns could fire both solid shot and explosive shells. They were mounted on carriages that used hydraulic jacks to elevate and depress the guns.

The Cyclops class had a complete waterline belt of wrought iron that was 8 inches (203 mm) thick amidships and thinned to 6 inches (152 mm) at the ends. The superstructure and conning tower was fully armoured, the reason it was called a breastwork, with 8–9 inches (203–229 mm) of wrought iron. The gun turrets had 10 inches on their faces and 9 inches on the sides and rear. All of the vertical armour was backed by 9–11 inches (229–279 mm) of teak. The decks were 1.5 inches (38.1 mm) thick.

== Construction and career ==
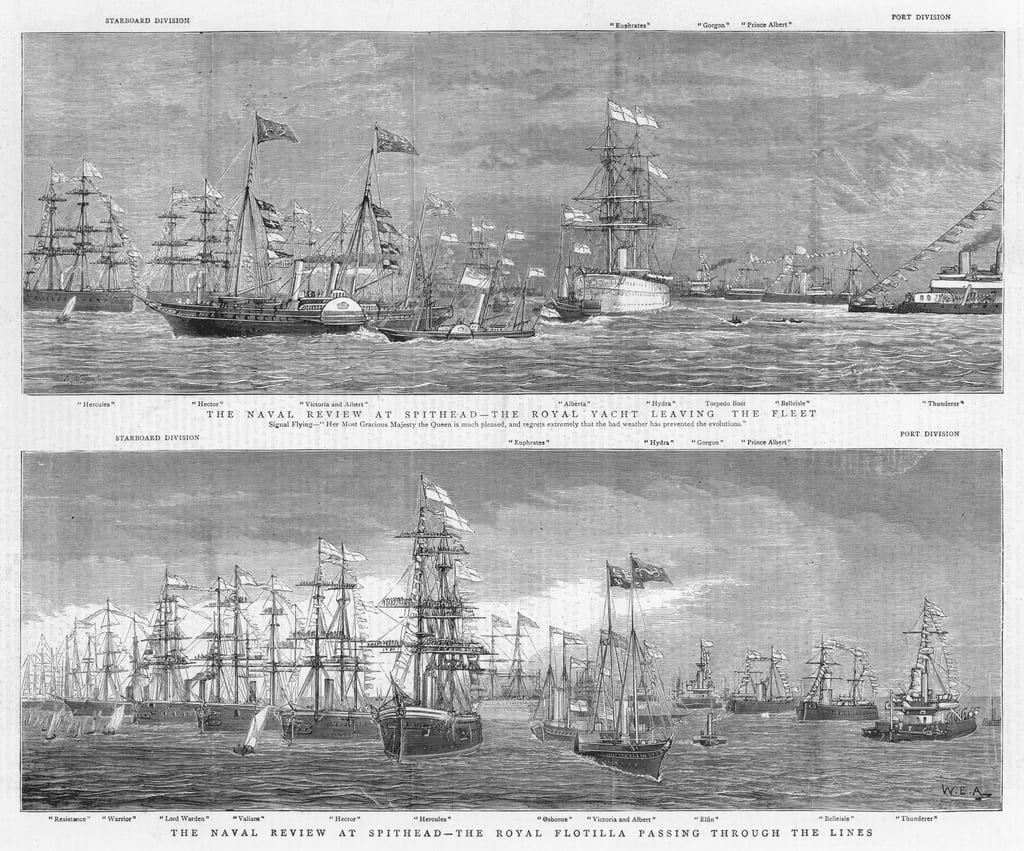
Gorgon featured at the Naval Review at Spithead in 1878. The Graphic

Together with her sister ships, the Cyclops and the Hecate, she was placed on the non-effective list of ships in January 1902. She was sold for scrap the following year.
