= Cyclops-class monitor =

Class of breastwork monitors

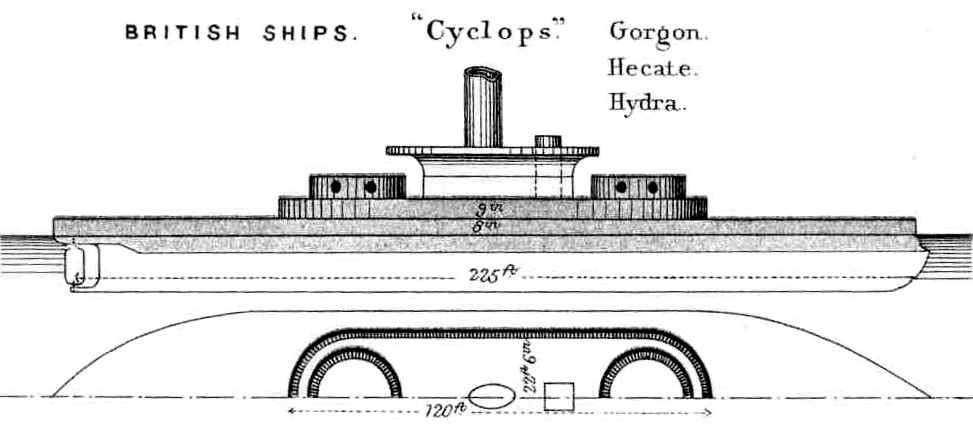
- Right elevation plan from Brassey's Naval Annual 1888–1889

Class overview
- Name: Cyclops class
- Operators: Royal Navy
- Preceded by: HMS Rupert
- Succeeded by: Conqueror class
- Built: 1870–1877
- In service: 1874–1901
- Planned: 4
- Completed: 4
- Scrapped: 4

General characteristics
- Type: Breastwork monitor
- Displacement: 3,480 long tons (3,540 t)
- Length: 225 ft (68.6 m) (p/p)
- Beam: 45 ft (13.7 m)
- Draught: 16 ft 3 in (5.0 m) (deep load)
- Installed power: 1,472–1,709 indicated horsepower (1,098–1,274 kW)
- Propulsion: 2 shafts, 2 steam engines
- Speed: 11 knots (20 km/h; 13 mph)
- Range: 3,000 nmi (5,600 km; 3,500 mi) at 10 kn (19 km/h; 12 mph)
- Complement: 156
- Armament: 2 × 2 - 10-inch (254-mm) rifled muzzle loading guns
- Armour: Belt: 6–8 in (152–203 mm); Deck: 1.5 in (38 mm); Superstructures: 8–9 in (203–229 mm); Conning tower: 8–9 in (203–229 mm); Gun turret: 9–10 in (229–254 mm)

The Cyclops-class monitor was a group of four ironclad breastwork monitors built for the Royal Navy during the 1870s. They were slightly modified versions of the Cerberus-class monitors. The ships were ordered to satisfy demands for local defence during the war scare of 1870, but the pace of construction slowed tremendously as the perceived threat of war declined. The Cyclops-class monitors spent most of their careers in reserve and were finally sold off in 1903.

== Design and description ==
The immediate reason why these ships were ordered was for local coast defence during the war scare during the Franco-Prussian War of 1870, but they were chosen for several other reasons. They were small and cheap, and their shallow draft was thought to limit them to defensive operations, which appealed to economy and defence-minded Members of Parliament. The Admiralty, however, envisioned them attacking shallow-water ports that larger ironclads could not enter and operating in the shallow waters of the Baltic Sea.

The ships used the basic design of the Cerberus-class breastwork monitors to reduce design and construction time. Their hulls were completed very quickly, but building pace reduced as the likelihood of their immediate use diminished. They were delivered to the Royal dockyards in 1872 and commissioned for fitting out, but a number of years elapsed before that process was completed, and there was little sense of urgency.

The ships had a length between perpendiculars of 225 feet (68.6 m), a beam of 45 feet (13.7 m), and a draught of 16 feet 3 inches (4.95 m) at deep load. They displaced 3,480 long tons (3,540 t). Their crew consisted of 156 officers and men.

The Cyclops-class ships and other ships of her type were described by Admiral George Alexander Ballard as being like "full-armoured knights riding on donkeys, easy to avoid but bad to close with." While not unfit to face heavy weather their decks were frequently awash in even a moderate sea. Their accommodations were rated the worst in the fleet, referred to by ordinary seamen as "ratholes with tinned air".

=== Propulsion ===
The Cyclops-class ships had two steam engines, each driving a single 12-foot (3.7 m) propeller. Cyclops and Hydra had 4-cylinder inverted compound steam engines made by John Elder that had a working pressure of 60 psi (414 kPa; 4 kgf/cm^{2}). The engines produced a total of 1,472–1,528 indicated horsepower (1,098–1,139 kW) on sea trials which gave the ships a maximum speed around 11 knots (20 km/h; 13 mph). The engines used by Hecate and Gorgon were built by Ravenhill and were simple horizontal 4-cylinder direct acting steam engines. Their working pressure was 34 psi (234 kPa; 2 kgf/cm^{2}) and they produced a total of 1,579–1,709 indicated horsepower (1,177–1,274 kW) for about the same speed. The first pair of ships carried 250 long tons (250 t) of coal while the second pair carried 270 long tons (270 t). This was enough to steam 3,000 nmi (5,600 km; 3,500 mi) at 10 kn (19 km/h; 12 mph).

=== Armament ===
The ships mounted a pair of 10-inch rifled muzzle-loading guns in each turret. The shell of the 10-inch (254 mm) gun weighed 407 pounds (184.6 kg) while the gun itself weighed 18 long tons (18 t). The gun had a muzzle velocity of 1,365 ft/s (416 m/s) and was credited with the ability to penetrate a nominal 12.9 in (330 mm) of wrought iron armour at the muzzle. The guns could fire both solid shot and explosive shells. They were mounted on compound pivoting carriages that used hydraulic jacks to elevate and depress the guns.

=== Armour ===
The Cyclops-class ships had a complete waterline belt of wrought iron that was 8 inches (203 mm) thick amidships and thinned to 6 inches (152 mm) at the ends. The superstructure and conning tower was fully armoured, the reason it was called a breastwork, with 8–9 inches (203–229 mm) of wrought iron. The gun turrets had 10 inches on their faces and nine inches on the sides and rear. All of the vertical armour was backed by 9–11 inches (229–279 mm) of teak. The decks were 1.5 inches (38.1 mm) thick.

== Construction ==
Each of the ships was towed to Devonport from the builders in 1872. They were commissioned and placed into reserve until finally completed.

Ship	Builder	Laid down	Launched	Commissioned	Completed	Fate	Cost
HMS Cyclops	Thames Ironworks, London	10 September 1870	18 July 1871	January 1872	4 May 1877	Sold 7 July 1903	£156,782
HMS Gorgon	Palmers Shipbuilding, Jarrow	5 September 1870	14 October 1871	April 1872	19 March 1874	Sold 12 May 1903	£141,254
HMS Hecate	Dudgeon, Cubitt Town, London	5 September 1870	30 September 1871	April 1872	24 May 1877	Sold 12 May 1903	£143,310
HMS Hydra	Robert Napier and Sons, Govan	5 September 1870	28 December 1871	August 1872	31 May 1876	Sold 7 July 1903	£194,334

=== Refit ===
Although a recommendation had been made while the ships were still under construction to extend the superstructure out to the sides of the ship to improve their stability and habitability, this was not acted upon until they were refitted during the 1880s. This refit also strengthened the breastwork and upper decks, added another watertight bulkhead as well as a false keel. Four quick-firing 3-pounder Hotchkiss guns were added on the breastwork for torpedo boat defence as well as five machine guns and several searchlights. This increased their crew to approximately 191 men and added 80 long tons (81 t) to their displacement.

== Service ==
HMS Gorgon was the first ship completed and she served as tender to HMS Cambridge, the gunnery school ship at Devonport, from 1874 to 1877. All four ships were commissioned between April and August 1878 during the war scare during the Russo-Turkish War for service with Admiral Sir Cooper Key's Particular Service Squadron in Portland Harbour. She resumed her duties as tender to HMS Cambridge until she was refitted in 1888–89. All four of the ships of the class participated in the annual fleet manoeuvers in 1887, 1889–90 and 1892; in between times they were in Fleet Reserve. HMS Gorgon, like all of her sisters, was placed on the non-effective list in 1901 and sold in 1903 for £8,400.

HMS Hydra was the next ship to be completed. After her service with the Particular Service Squadron she was paid off at Sheerness and served as tender to HMS Duncan. The ship was refitted in 1888–89 and was in Fleet Reserve at Chatham until 1901.

HMS Cyclops, the lead ship of the class, was the third ship to be completed. She was placed in 1st Reserve after her completion. The ship was paid off at Chatham in August 1878 and refitted in 1887–89.

HMS Hecate was the fourth and final ship of the class to be completed. She paid off at Devonport after her service with the Particular Service Squadron. The ship was refitted in 1885–86 and was placed into reserve at Devonport afterwards.
