= HMS Hecate =

Five ships of the Royal Navy have borne the name HMS Hecate, after Hecate, a goddess in early Greek mythology:

- HMS Hecate (1797) was a 12-gun gunvessel launched in 1797 and sunk as a breakwater in 1809.
- HMS Hecate (1809) was an 18-gun Cruizer-class brig-sloop launched in 1809 and sold in 1817.
- HMS Hecate (1839) was a 4-gun wooden Hydra-class paddle sloop launched in 1839, fitted out for survey work in 1860 and sold in 1865.
- HMS Hecate (1871) was an iron screw Cyclops-class breastwork monitor launched in 1871 and sold in 1903.
- HMS Hecate (A137) was a Hecla-class survey vessel launched in 1965. She was put up for disposal in 1991, and sailed to India to be broken up in 1994.
