= Hecate (disambiguation) =

Hecate is a Titaness in ancient Greek religion and mythology.

Hecate or Hekate may also refer to:

== Fictional characters ==
- Hecate (Dune)
- Hecate (Marvel Comics)
- Hecate, one of the Olympian Gods in DC Comics
- Hecate (Shakugan no Shana)
- Hecate, queen of the witches in Macbeth
- Hecate, a member of Xavier's Security Enforcers in Marvel comics
- Hecate, a character in Hellboy

== Ships ==
- HMS Hecate, the name of several Royal Navy ships
- USS Hecate, known earlier as USS Etlah, a single-turreted, twin-screw monitor laid down in 1864

== Other uses ==
- Hécate, a 1982 French-Swiss film
- Hecate (Amazon), a mythological Amazon who fell at Troy
- Hecate (journal), an Australian feminist academic journal
- Hecate (musician) (born 1976)
- Hecate (William Blake) or The Night of Enitharmon's Joy, a 1795 work of art
- 100 Hekate, an asteroid
- Hecate Strait, a strait in British Columbia, Canada
  - Hecate Island
- 2,5-Dimethoxy-4-ethylamphetamine or Hecate, a psychedelic drug
- Hecate, an 0-8-0 tank locomotive built for the Kent & East Sussex Railway

== See also ==
- Memoirs of Hecate County, a 1946 book by Edmund Wilson
- PGM Hécate II, a French sniper rifle
