= HMS Hydra (1871) =

Cyclops-class monitor

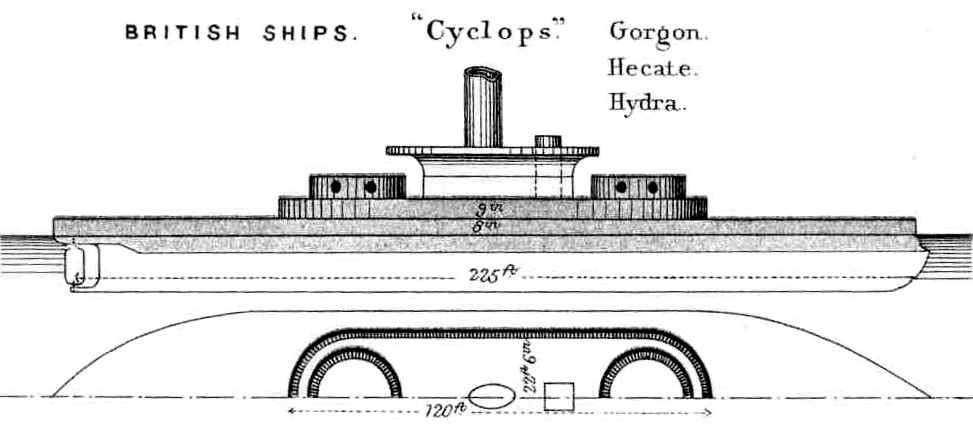
- Right elevation plan from Brassey's Naval Annual 1888–1889

History

United Kingdom
- Name: HMS Hydra
- Namesake: Hydra
- Builder: Robert Napier and Sons, Govan
- Cost: £194,334
- Laid down: 28 December 1870
- Launched: 18 July 1871
- Completed: 31 May 1877
- Commissioned: August 1872
- Out of service: 1901
- Refit: 1888–89
- Fate: Sold for scrap 7 July 1903

General characteristics
- Class & type: Cyclops-class breastwork monitor
- Displacement: 3,480 long tons (3,540 t)
- Length: 225 ft (68.6 m) (p/p)
- Beam: 45 ft (13.7 m)
- Draught: 16 ft 3 in (5.0 m) (deep load)
- Installed power: 1,528 ihp (1,139 kW)
- Propulsion: 2 shafts, 2 steam engines
- Speed: 11 knots (20 km/h; 13 mph)
- Range: 3,000 nmi (5,600 km; 3,500 mi) at 10 kn (19 km/h; 12 mph)
- Complement: 156
- Armament: 2 × 2 - 10-inch rifled muzzle loaders
- Armour: Belt: 6–8 in (152–203 mm); Deck: 1.5 in (38 mm); Superstructure: 8–9 in (203–229 mm); Conning tower: 8–9 in (203–229 mm); Gun turret: 9–10 in (229–254 mm)

HMS Hydra was the second ship completed of the four Cyclops-class breastwork monitors built for the Royal Navy during the 1870s. The ships were ordered to satisfy demands for local defence during the war scare of 1870, but the pace of construction slowed tremendously as the perceived threat of war declined. The ship spent most of her career in reserve; her only sustained period in commission was four months during the Russo-Turkish War in 1878 when the British were trying to force the Russians to end the war without seizing Constantinople. Hydra was sold for scrap in 1903.

== Design and description ==
The ships had a length between perpendiculars of 225 feet (68.6 m), a beam of 45 feet (13.7 m), and a draught of 16 feet 3 inches (4.95 m) at deep load. They displaced 3,480 long tons (3,540 t). Their crew consisted of 156 officers and men.

The Cyclops-class ships and other ships of her type were described by Admiral George Alexander Ballard as being like "full-armoured knights riding on donkeys, easy to avoid but bad to close with." While not unfit to face heavy weather their decks were frequently awash in even a moderate sea. Their accommodations were rated the worst in the fleet, referred to by ordinary seamen as "ratholes with tinned air".

=== Propulsion ===
Hydra had two 4-cylinder inverted compound steam engines made by John Elder, each driving a single 12-foot (3.7 m) propeller. The ship's boilers had a working pressure of 60 psi (414 kPa; 4 kgf/cm^{2}). The engines produced a total of 1,472 indicated horsepower (1,098 kW) on 4 July 1872 during the ship's sea trials which gave her a maximum speed of 11.2 knots (20.7 km/h; 12.9 mph). Hydra carried 250 long tons (250 t) of coal, enough to steam 3,000 nmi (5,600 km; 3,500 mi) at 10 kn (19 km/h; 12 mph).

=== Armament ===
The ships mounted a pair of 10-inch rifled muzzle-loading guns in each turret. The shell of the 10-inch (254 mm) gun weighed 407 pounds (184.6 kg) while the gun itself weighed 18 long tons (18 t). The gun had a muzzle velocity of 1,365 ft/s (416 m/s) and was credited with the ability to penetrate a nominal 12.9 inches (330 mm) of wrought iron armour at 100 yards (91 m). The guns could fire both solid shot and explosive shells. They were mounted on carriages that used hydraulic jacks to elevate and depress the guns.

=== Armour ===
The Cyclops-class ships had a complete waterline belt of wrought iron that was 8 inches (203 mm) thick amidships and thinned to 6 inches (152 mm) at the ends. The superstructure and conning tower was fully armoured, the reason it was called a breastwork, with 8–9 inches (203–229 mm) of wrought iron. The gun turrets had 10 inches on their faces and 9 inches on the sides and rear. All of the vertical armour was backed by 9–11 inches (229–279 mm) of teak. The decks were 1.5 inches (38.1 mm) thick.

== Construction ==
Hydra was laid down on 5 September 1870 by the Robert Napier and Sons in Govan. She was launched on 28 December 1871 and commissioned in August 1872. The ship was towed to Devonport that same month for what proved to be a very lengthy fitting out period that was not completed on 31 May 1876. Cyclops cost £194,334 to build.

=== Refit ===
Although a recommendation had been made while the ships were still under construction to extend the superstructure out to the sides of the ship to improve their stability and habitability, this was not acted upon until they were refitted during the 1880s. This refit also strengthened the breastwork and upper decks, added another watertight bulkhead as well as a false keel. Four quick-firing 3-pounder Hotchkiss guns were added on the breastwork for torpedo boat defence as well as five machine guns and several searchlights. This increased their crew to approximately 191 men and added 80 long tons (81 t) to their displacement.

== Service ==
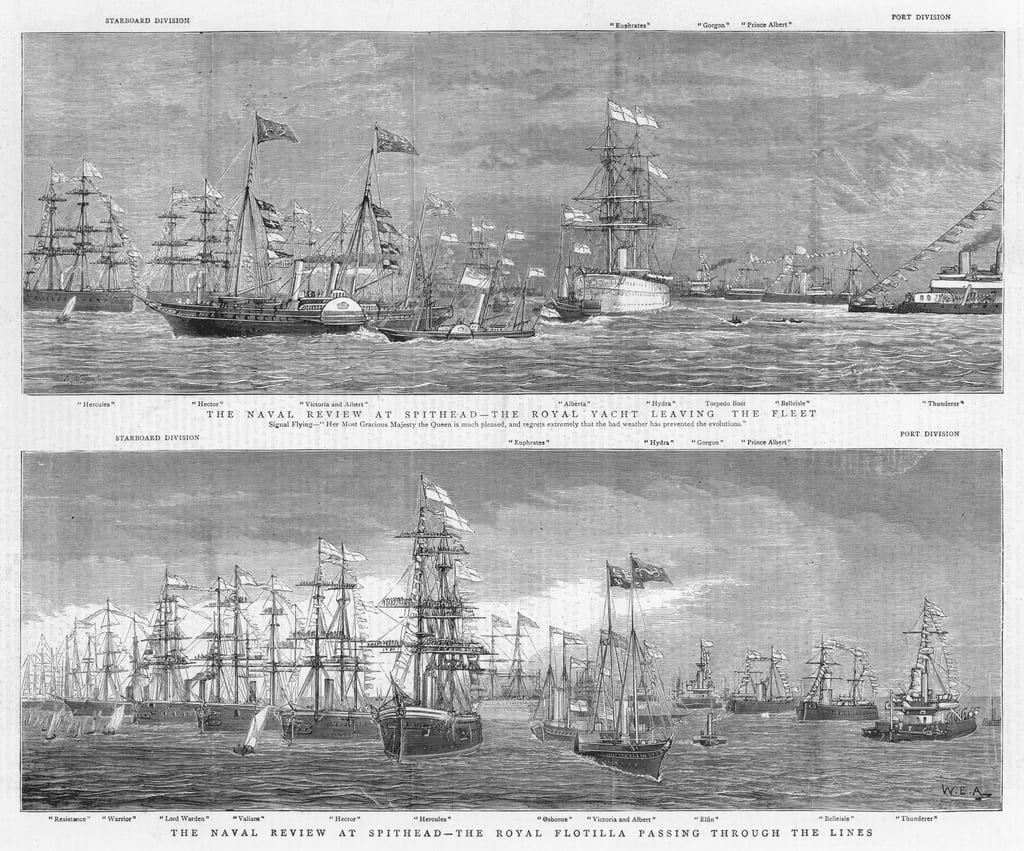
Hydra featured at the Naval Review at Spithead in 1878. The Graphic

HMS Hydra was the second ship to be completed, although she was the last ship of the class launched. She was placed in 1st Reserve after her completion. The ship, along with her sisters, was commissioned between April and August 1878 during the Russo-Turkish War for service with Admiral Sir Cooper Key's Particular Service Squadron in Portland Harbour. Hydra was paid off at Sheerness in August 1878 and served as tender to HMS Duncan. The ship was refitted in 1888–89 and was in Fleet Reserve at Chatham until 1901. All four ships of the class participated in the annual fleet manoeuvers in 1887, 1889–90 and 1892. HMS Hydra, like all of her sisters, was placed on the non-effective list in 1901 and sold on 7 July 1903 for £8,400.
