= List of battleships of the Royal Navy =

For lists of battleships of the Royal Navy see:

- List of ships of the line of the Royal Navy
- List of ironclads of the Royal Navy
- List of pre-dreadnought battleships of the Royal Navy
- List of dreadnought battleships of the Royal Navy
- List of battlecruisers of the Royal Navy

== See also ==
For earlier examples see "Great ships" and "First rate ships" at List of early warships of the English navy
