= Geelong Maritime Museum =

- Established: 1989
- Location: 'The Stables', Osborne House, Swinburn Street, North Geelong Victoria, Australia
- Coordinates: 38.118708°S 144.358164°E
- Type: Maritime museum

The Geelong Maritime Museum is a volunteer-run Community group or not-for-profit historical museum located at 'The Stables', Osborne House in Swinburn Street, North Geelong, Victoria, Australia since 1993. The Museum was founded in about 1989, with ex Royal Navy Ldg. Tel, Robert Henry (Bob) Appleton OAM as the foundation Honorary Curator. The Museum collects and displays historic artefacts and documents related to the Maritime History of Geelong and Victoria, and the history of the Victorian and Australian Navies.

The Geelong Maritime Museum is housed in the renovated stables of Osborne House, which was built in 1858 for local squatter Robert Muirhead. Following a number of private owners, the building was then purchased by the Victorian State Government in 1900 as a country residence for the Governor of Victoria though it was never used for this purpose. It was bought by the Geelong Harbour Trust in 1905, and subsequently became the first Australian Naval College from 1913 to 1915, a military hospital during World War One, and the first home for the J Class Submarine of the Royal Australian Navy's submarine service between 1919 and 1924. The Geelong Harbour Trust resumed control in 1929, and the Shire of Corio moved in during 1938. It was a training centre for the Royal Australian Army during World War Two, followed by the Corio Shire Council from 1943 to 1995 when the shire merged with the City of Geelong.

Displays at the museum include scale models of ships that either visited Geelong or called the port home as well as relics of the maritime trade, navigation equipment, uniforms, weaponry and other naval artefacts. Exhibitions also presents the HMVS Cerberus Gun Turret and the helm of the HMVS Nelson.
