= HMS Sultan (1870) =

1870 ironclad of the Royal Navy

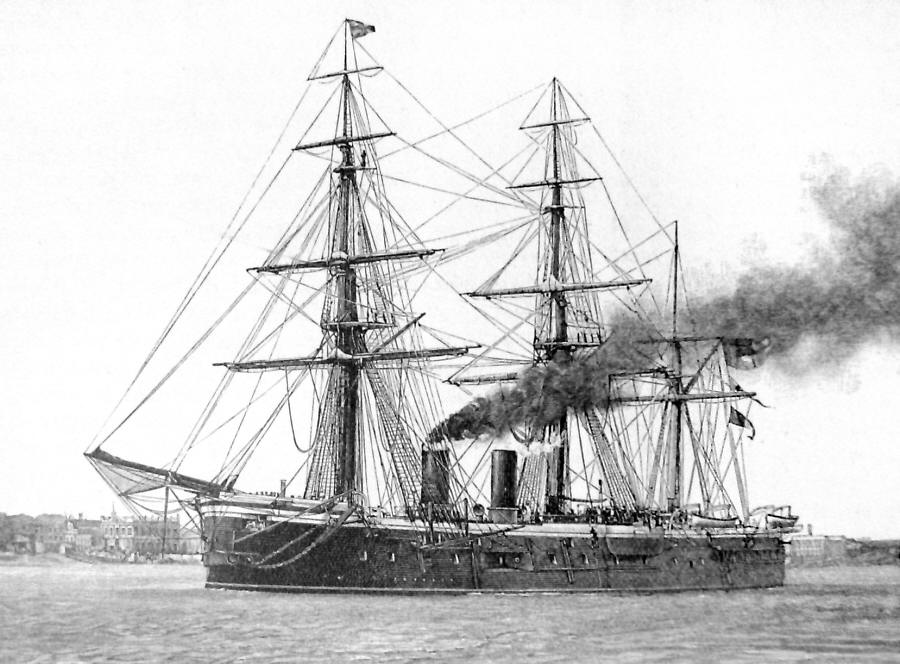
- HMS Sultan as she originally appeared.

History

United Kingdom
- Name: HMS Sultan
- Namesake: Abdulaziz
- Builder: Chatham Dockyard
- Laid down: 29 February 1868
- Launched: 31 May 1870
- Completed: 10 October 1871
- Fate: Broken up, 1946

General characteristics
- Displacement: 9,290 long tons (9,439 t)
- Length: 325 ft (99 m)
- Beam: 59 ft (18 m)
- Draught: 25 ft 6 in (7.77 m) light; 28 ft 9 in (8.76 m) deep load
- Propulsion: One-shaft Penn trunk engine, 7,720 ihp (5,757 kW)
- Sail plan: Full-rigged ship, sail area 49,400 sq ft (4,590 m^{2})
- Speed: 14.13 knots (16.26 mph; 26.17 km/h) under power; 6 knots (11 km/h) under sail
- Complement: 633
- Armament: 8 × 10-inch (254 mm) rifled muzzle-loading guns; 4 × 9-inch (229 mm) muzzle-loading rifles; 7 × 20-pounder breech-loading rifles
- Armour: Belt: 6–9 in (150–230 mm); Main deck battery: 9 in (230 mm); Upper deck battery: 8 in (200 mm); Bulkheads: 4.5–6 in (110–150 mm)

HMS Sultan was a broadside ironclad of the Royal Navy of the Victorian era, who carried her main armament in a central box battery. She was named for Sultan Abdulaziz of the Ottoman Empire, who was visiting England when she was laid down. Abdulaziz cultivated good relations with the Second French Empire and the British. In 1867 he was the first Ottoman sultan to peacefully visit Western Europe; his trip included a visit to England, where he was made a Knight of the Garter by Queen Victoria and shown a Royal Navy Fleet Review, with Isma'il Pasha of Egypt.

== Design ==
With the exception of some small warships designed only for harbour defence, every ironclad warship completed till the launch of Sultan, starting from HMS Warrior, had mounted their main armament in broadside batteries. Although the turret-armed ships HMS Monarch and HMS Captain were building, it was decided by the Board of Admiralty that, pending results from these two experimental ships, Sultan would carry her artillery in a centrally-placed box battery.

The design of the ship was closely based on the design of HMS Hercules. Unlike the battery of the earlier ship, that of Sultan was on two levels; the main deck guns provided broadside fire, with limited ahead fire from the foremost gun, while the upper deck guns provided additional broadside fire and also could fire astern, by traversing the after gun on a turntable.

The hull had one of the roundest amidships cross-section ever adopted at the time of her launch, and this and the low metacentric height of only three feet made her a very steady gun platform. It was soon found, however, that she lacked adequate stability - in naval parlance she was "tender" - and some six hundred tons of extra ballast had to be inserted into her double bottom.

== Service history ==
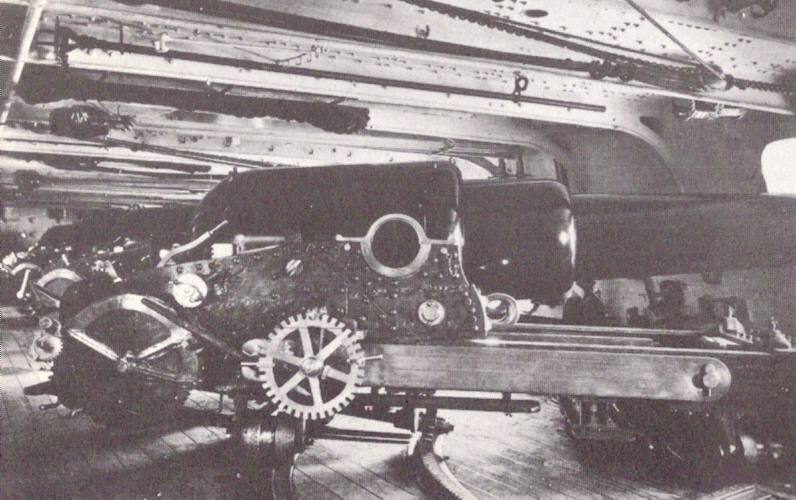
A 10-inch (254 mm) 18-ton rifled muzzleloading gun aboard Sultan in the 1890s.

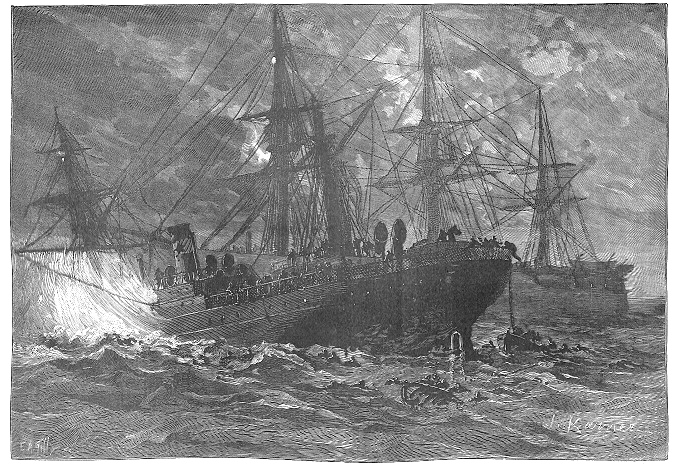
Ville de Victoria and HMS Sultan.

She was commissioned at Chatham for the Channel Fleet, in which she served until 1876. She was refitted, being reduced to barque rig, and posted to the Mediterranean under the command of His Royal Highness the Duke of Edinburgh. She was with Admiral Geoffrey Hornby at the Dardanelles in 1878.

She was then again refitted, and reduced to re-serve in 1882, when she returned to the Mediterranean under command of Captain W. J. Hunt-Grubbe. At the bombardment of Alexandria (1882) she sustained casualties of two killed and eight wounded from a single hit on the battery. She was with the Particular Service Squadron during the Russian war scare of June to August, 1885, and was retained in the Mediterranean thereafter. On 24 December 1886, she collided with the French steamship Ville de Victoria off Lisbon, Portugal. Her ram holed the steamship, which sank with some loss of life.

On 6 March 1889 she grounded on an uncharted rock in the Comino Channel between Malta and Gozo, ripping her bottom open. The Temeraire unsuccessfully tried to pull her off. The Sultan slowly flooded and in a gale on 14 March 1889 she slipped off the rock and sank. She was raised in August by the Italian firm of Baghino & Co for a fee of £50,000. On 27 August the Sultan was brought into Malta. Malta Dockyard made preliminary repairs. In December 1889, the Sultan made the passage back to Portsmouth under her own steam, at 7 knots (8.1 mph; 13 km/h) (though accompanied by another ship), arriving at Spithead on 22 December.

=== Modernisation ===
The Sultan was put in dry dock at Portsmouth. Between October 1892 and March 1896, she was modernised at a cost of over £200,000. She was given two tall funnels, a double bridge forward, and new decks. Her old sailing rig was removed, and replaced by two military masts with fighting tops. She was given modern boilers capable of 150 pounds per square inch (10 atm; 1,000 kPa), and modern triple-expansion engines made by J & G Thomson of Clydebank. At natural draught, on trial in late May 1895, these made 6,531 indicated horsepower (4,870 kW) giving an average speed 14.6 knots (16.8 mph; 27.0 km/h). On a four-hour trial, with forced draught, she made an average of 15.3 knots (17.6 mph; 28.3 km/h), for a power of 8,244 indicated horsepower (6,148 kW). Parkes said that there was intense vibration on these trials.

As modernised her armament consisted of:

- 8 × 10-inch MLR
- 4 × 9-inch MLR
- 4 × 120mm 4.7-inch QF
- 9 × 57mm 6-pr QF (either Nordenfelt or Hotchkiss pattern)
- 13 × 47 mm 3-pr QF
- 7 × machineguns
- 2 × light field guns

As the modernisation affected the distribution of weights on the ship, her beam was increased with a waterline girdling of 9 inches (23 cm) teak, which raised her metacentric height.

The Engineer criticised the decision to retain the muzzle-loading guns, saying that "So much money has been spent on this ship since she was brought home from the Comino Channel that one would like to see a better result." According to Parkes, "nothing could be done to strengthen the old M.L. battery"; he thought that the old ship was not worth the money spent modernising her.

=== Post-modernisation ===
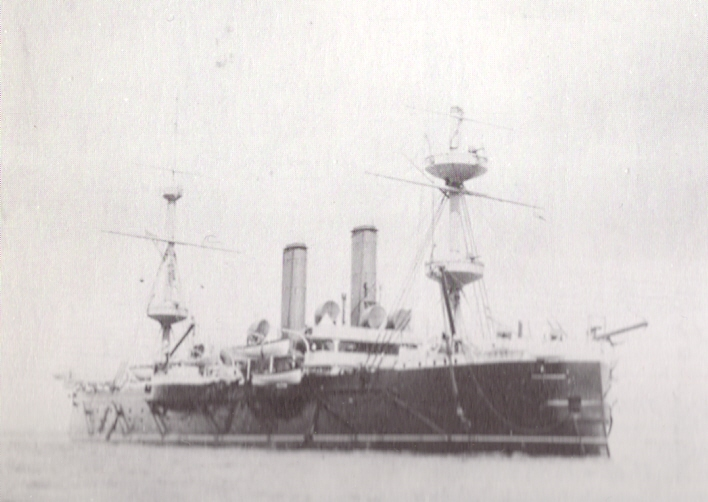
Sultan sometime after her 1892-1896 reconstruction. Note the double-bridge, tall funnels and military masts. The fighting tops on the military masts held 3 pr (47mm) guns.

She then served in the reserve. She commissioned for sea-service twice whilst in reserve:

- For the 1896 annual manoeuvres, from 8 July to 25 August 1896, when she served as one of the battleships of the C Fleet based in Milford Haven.
- For the 1900 annual manoeuvres, 10 July to 24 August 1900, when she served as one of the 12 battleships of the A Fleet based in Ireland. The action on 2 August took the form of a general chase of the A Fleet by the stronger B Fleet. To get away, the A Fleet steered a course against a strong head wind and heavy sea, which was sustained for hours. This obliged the A Fleet to detach the old Dreadnought and send her to Queenstown. The Sultan was able to keep up for a while, but when the A Fleet made 13 knots, the Sultan struggled to maintain station, and eventually had to be detached and sent to Berehaven, allowing the remaining battleships (of the Royal Sovereign and Majestic classes) to quicken speed to 14 knots and get away.

In 1906, she was partially dismantled and became an artificers' training ship under the name of Fisgard IV; in 1931 she was further converted into a mechanical repair ship, regaining her original name of Sultan. During World War II she was a depot ship for minesweepers at Portsmouth, and was sold in 1947.

== Publications ==
- Brown, David K. (1997). Warrior to Dreadnought: Warship Development 1860–1905. Chatham Publishing. ISBN 1-86176-022-1.
- Colledge, J. J.; Warlow, Ben (2006) [1969]. Ships of the Royal Navy: The Complete Record of All Fighting Ships of the Royal Navy from the 15th Century to the Present (3rd Rev ed.). London: Chatham Publishing. ISBN 978-1-86176-281-8. OCLC 67375475.
- Dodson, Aidan (2015). "The Incredible Hulks: The Fisgard Training Establishment and Its Ships". Warship 2015. Conway. pp. 29–43. ISBN 978-1-84486-276-4.
- Friedman, Norman (2018). British Battleships of the Victorian Era. Naval Institute Press. ISBN 978-1-68247-329-0.
- Gossett, William Patrick (1986) The Lost Ships of the Royal Navy, 1793-1900. (London: Mansell). ISBN 0-7201-1816-6
- Lyon, David & Winfield, Rif (2004). The Sail and Steam Navy List: All the Ships of the Royal Navy 1815–1889. Chatham Publishing. ISBN 978-1-86176-032-6. OCLC 52620555.
- Parkes, Oscar (1990) [1966]. British Battleships, Warrior 1860 to Vanguard 1950: A History of Design, Construction, and Armament (New & rev. ed.). Naval Institute Press. ISBN 1-55750-075-4.
- Roberts, John (1979). "Great Britain and Empire Forces". In Chesneau, Roger & Kolesnik, Eugene M. (eds.). Conway's All the World's Fighting Ships 1860-1905. Greenwich, UK: Conway Maritime Press. ISBN 0-8317-0302-4.
