= HMS Cyclops (1871) =

British Cyclops-class monitor

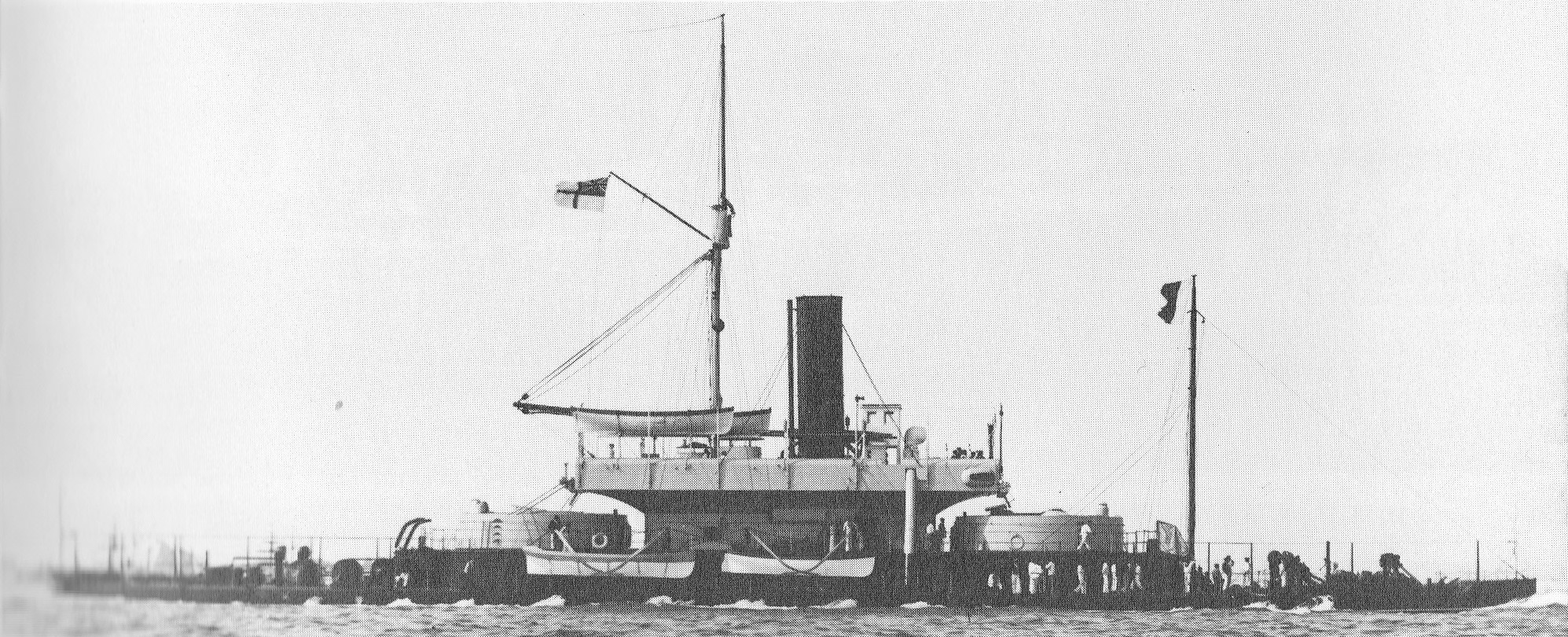
- Cyclops

History

United Kingdom
- Name: HMS Cyclops
- Namesake: Cyclops
- Builder: Thames Ironworks, London
- Cost: £156,782
- Laid down: 10 September 1870
- Launched: 18 July 1871
- Completed: 4 May 1877
- Commissioned: January 1872
- Out of service: 1901
- Refit: 1887–89
- Fate: Sold for scrap 1903

General characteristics
- Class & type: Cyclops-class breastwork monitor
- Displacement: 3,480 long tons (3,540 t)
- Length: 225 ft (68.6 m) (p/p)
- Beam: 45 ft (13.7 m)
- Draught: 16 ft 3 in (5.0 m) (deep load)
- Installed power: 1,528 ihp (1,139 kW)
- Propulsion: 2 shafts, 2 steam engines
- Speed: 11 knots (20 km/h; 13 mph)
- Range: 3,000 nmi (5,600 km; 3,500 mi) at 10 kn (19 km/h; 12 mph)
- Complement: 156
- Armament: 2 × twin 10-inch rifled muzzle loaders
- Armour: Belt: 6–8 in (152–203 mm); Deck: 1.5 in (38 mm); Superstructure: 8–9 in (203–229 mm); Conning tower: 8–9 in (203–229 mm); Gun turret: 9–10 in (229–254 mm)

HMS Cyclops was the lead ship of the Cyclops-class breastwork monitors built for the Royal Navy during the 1870s. The ships were ordered to satisfy demands for local defence during the war scare of 1870, but the pace of construction slowed tremendously as the perceived threat of war declined. The ship spent most of her career in reserve; her only sustained period in commission was four months in Portland Harbour, during the Russo-Turkish War in 1878 when the British were trying to force the Russians to end the war without allowing them to seize Constantinople. Cyclops was sold for scrap in 1903.

== Design and description ==
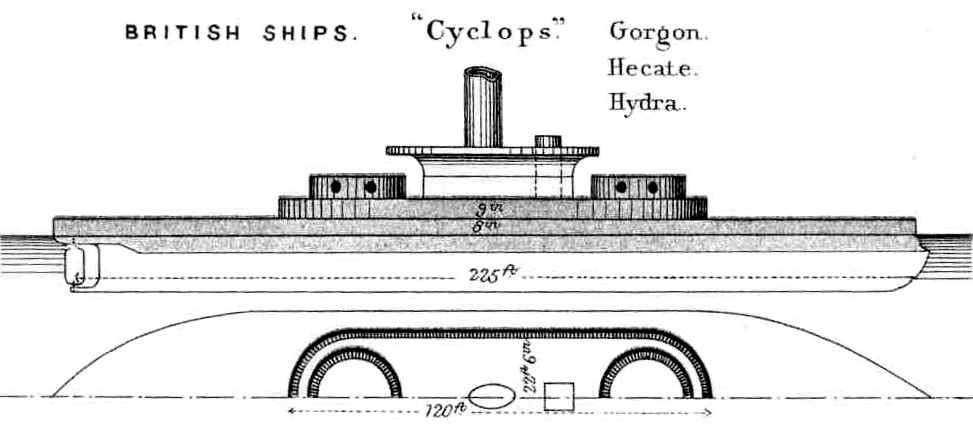
Right elevation plan from Brassey's Naval Annual 1888–1889

The Cyclops-class ships were modified versions of the Cerberus class. The ships had a length between perpendiculars of 225 feet (68.6 m), a beam of 45 feet (13.7 m), and a draught of 16 feet 3 inches (4.95 m) at deep load. They displaced 3,480 long tons (3,540 t). Their crew consisted of 156 officers and men. The ships had two 4-cylinder inverted compound steam engines, each driving a single propeller shaft. The engines produced a total of 1,528 indicated horsepower (1,139 kW) on 30 December 1871 during the ship's sea trials which gave her a maximum speed of 10.79 knots (19.98 km/h; 12.42 mph). Cyclops carried 250 long tons (250 t) of coal, enough to steam 3,000 nautical miles (5,600 km; 3,500 mi) at 10 knots (19 km/h; 12 mph).

The ships mounted four 10-inch rifled muzzle-loading guns in twin-gun turrets fore and aft of the superstructure. The guns could fire both solid shot and explosive shells. They were mounted on carriages that used hydraulic jacks to elevate and depress the guns.

The Cyclops class had a complete waterline belt of wrought iron that was 8 inches (203 mm) thick amidships and thinned to 6 inches (152 mm) at the ends. The superstructure and conning tower was fully armoured, the reason it was called a breastwork, with 8–9 inches (203–229 mm) of wrought iron. The gun turrets had 10 inches on their faces and 9 inches on the sides and rear. All of the vertical armour was backed by 9–11 inches (229–279 mm) of teak. The decks were 1.5 inches (38.1 mm) thick.

== Construction ==
HMS Cyclops was laid down on 10 September 1870 by the Thames Ironworks in London. She was launched on 18 July 1871 and commissioned in January 1872. The ship was towed to Devenport that same month for what proved to be a very lengthy fitting out period that was not completed until 4 May 1877. Cyclops cost £156,782 to build. (Note: Adjusted for inflation, the ship cost £17,823,621 in current pounds.)

=== Refit ===
Although a recommendation had been made while the ships were still under construction to extend the superstructure out to the sides of the ship to improve their stability and habitability, this was not acted upon until they were refitted during the 1880s. This refit also strengthened the breastwork and upper decks, added another watertight bulkhead as well as a false keel. Four quick-firing 3-pounder Hotchkiss guns were added on the breastwork for torpedo boat defence as well as five machine guns and several searchlights. This increased their crew to approximately 191 men and added 80 long tons (81 t) to their displacement.

== Service ==
HMS Cyclops was the third ship to be completed, although she was the lead ship of the class. She was placed in 1st Class Reserve after her completion. The ship, along with her sisters, was commissioned between April and August 1878 during the Russo-Turkish War for service with Admiral Sir Cooper Key's Particular Service Squadron in Portland Harbour. Cyclops was paid off at Chatham in August 1878 and refitted in 1887–89. All four ships of the class participated in the annual fleet manoeuvers in 1887, 1889–90 and 1892; in between times they were in Fleet Reserve. HMS Cyclops, like all of her sisters, was placed on the non-effective list in January 1902, transferred to the E Division of the Dockyard Reserve at Sheerness in May 1902, and sold on 7 July 1903 for £8,400. (Note: Adjusted for inflation, the ship sold for £883,069 in current pounds.)
