= HMS Rupert (1872) =

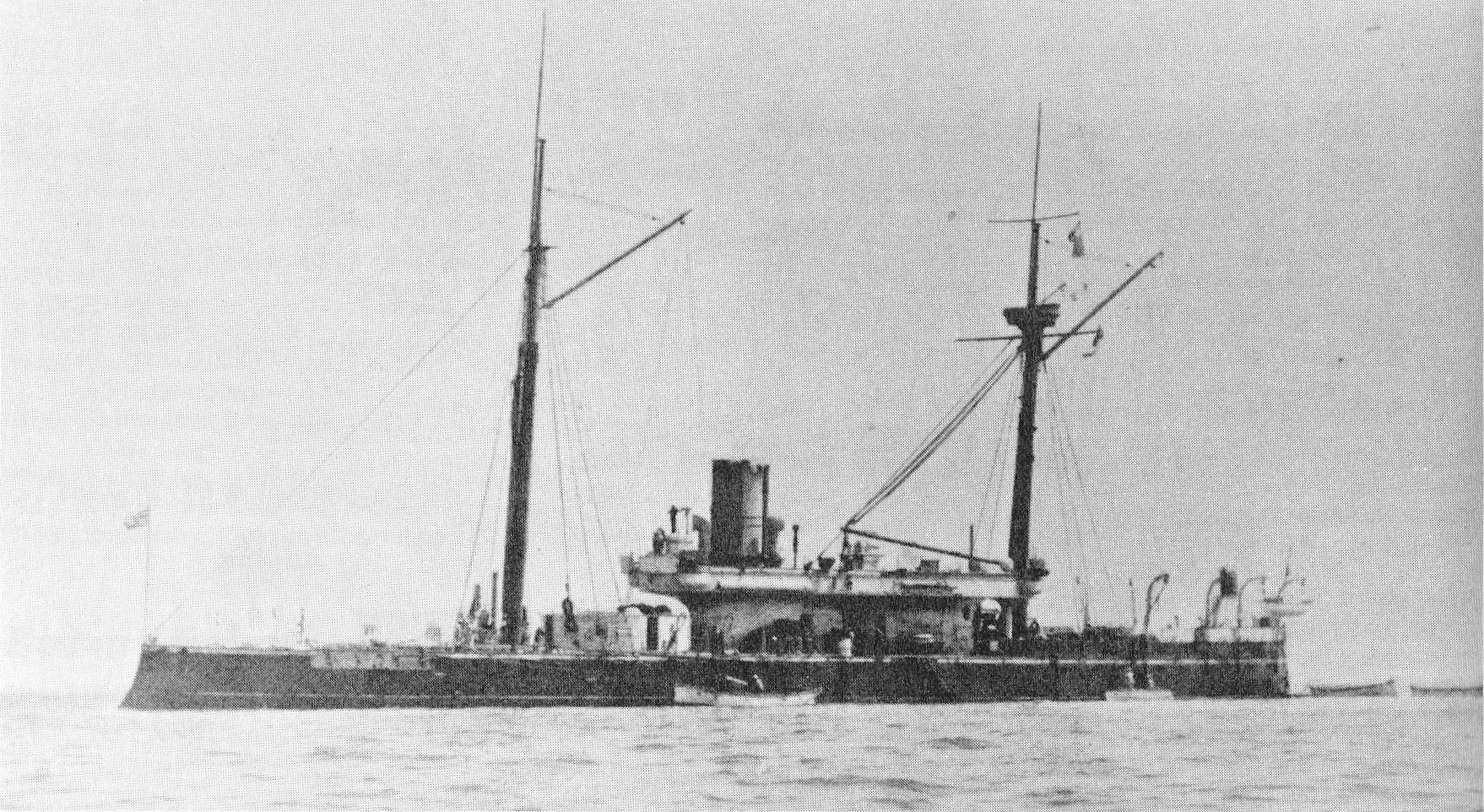
- Rupert circa. 1890

History

United Kingdom
- Name: HMS Rupert
- Builder: Chatham Dockyard
- Laid down: 6 June 1870
- Launched: 12 March 1872
- Completed: 1 July 1874
- Fate: Broken up, 1907

General characteristics
- Type: turret ram battleship
- Displacement: 5,440 long tons (5,527 t)
- Length: 250 ft (76 m)
- Beam: 53 ft (16 m)
- Draught: 22 ft 6 in (6.86 m)
- Propulsion: Two-shaft Napier; 4,630 ihp (3,453 kW)
- Speed: 13.6 knots (15.7 mph; 25.2 km/h)
- Complement: 217
- Armament: 1874 : Armoured ram; 2 × 10-inch (254 mm) 18 ton rifled muzzle-loading guns; 2 × 64-pounder smoothbore; 1887 : Armoured ram; 2 × 10 in (250 mm) 18 ton muzzle-loading rifles; 2 × BL 6-inch (152.4 mm) gun; 12 smaller guns; 4 × torpedo tubes; 1892 : 2 × BL 9.2-inch (233.7 mm) gun; 2 × BL 6-inch (152.4 mm) gun; 4 × QF 6-pounder guns; 8 smaller guns; 4 × torpedo tubes
- Armour: Belt: 11 in (280 mm) tapering to 9 in (230 mm); Breastwork: 12 in (300 mm); Turret: 14 in (360 mm) face, 12 in (300 mm) sides; Conning tower: 12 in (300 mm); Deck: 3 in (76 mm) tapering to 2 in (51 mm)

HMS Rupert was a battleship of the Victorian Royal Navy, whose principal weapon was designed to be her ram.

== Design ==
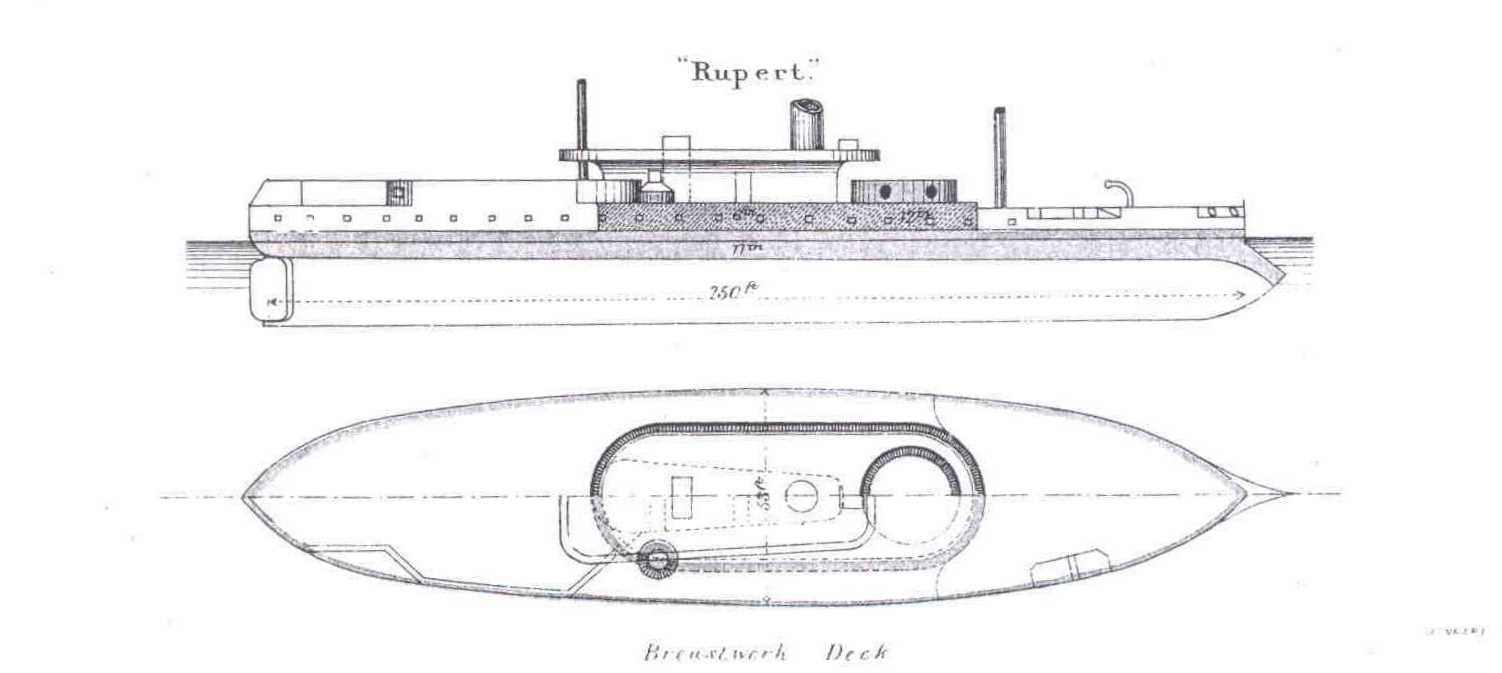
Right elevation and plan as depicted in Brassey's Naval Annual 1888

She was similar in design to HMS Hotspur, but unlike her carried a revolving turret similar to that carried in HMS Glatton. For reasons not recorded, it would appear that the belief prevalent at the time of the design of Hotspur that a ramming attack would damage the turret mechanism no longer held sway when Rupert was proposed.

As was Hotspur, she was designed at a time, shortly after the 1866 battle of Lissa, when it was believed that ramming attacks would, in the event of naval conflict, be the most effective form of offensive action. Artillery power was therefore given second priority to handiness and to frontal armour, including a prolongation of the belt armour to reinforce the ram. She carried two guns in her single turret, as against the single piece in Hotspur, but there was no intention or expectation of achieving all-round fire. The guns would bear from the bow to just abaft the beam on either side, except for the obstruction of the foremast and associated shrouds.

The ship was fitted with a fore-and-aft rig on her two masts, which had been designed to allow progress in the event of engine failure. Her sail effort was, however, described by her first Captain as "not worth the inconvenience of keeping them up".

As the ram had only been seen to be effective against stationary targets, as at the battle of Lissa, and against friendly ships in the course of accidental collision, the high reputation it enjoyed is not wholly understandable. A report by Capt. W.E. Gordon, submitted to the Board of Admiralty in February 1878 and referring to Rupert says: "she is a comparatively simple weapon within the capacity of an ordinary man to make the best use of, whereas the Captain of the Alexandra or Temeraire in action would be like a man armed with sword, rapier, rifle and pistol, trying to use them all at the same time. No man's faculties are equal to making the best use of such complicated machines." The unattributed comments to this report include the phrase "good in theory but not practicable supposing enemy has 14–15 knots and Rupert 11-12".

Unlike every other battleship, Rupert did not have a centre-line conning tower. Uniquely, she possessed two armoured pilot towers, one on either side just abaft the waist. These gave a good view on the beam, but very limited view over the bow, and her first captain described them as "almost useless".

== Service history ==
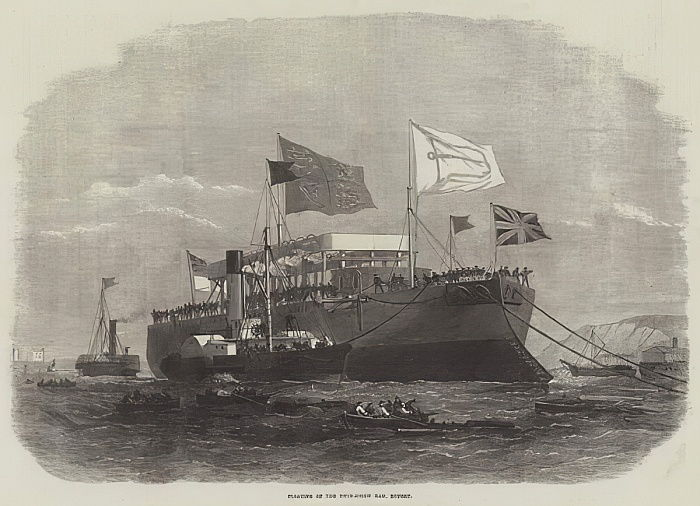
Floating of the Twin-Screw Ram Rupert at Chatham

She was commissioned at Devonport Dockyard for the Mediterranean, and served there from 1876 to 1880. She was thereafter held in reserve at Portsmouth until being assigned to service in the Particular Service Squadron during the Russian war scare of April to August; 1885. She was then assigned as guard ship at Hull until 1890. After reconstruction and re-armament between 1891 and 1893 she was guardship at Pembroke until 1895. She was port guard ship at Gibraltar from 1895, then at Port Said until late April 1902, when she returned home. Commander Algernon B Granville Grenfell was appointed in command in May 1898. She arrived at Plymouth in early May 1902, and paid off at Devonport on 28 May. She was in Fleet Reserve until 1904, from when she served finally as guard ship at Bermuda until her sale there in 1907.
