= Breastwork monitor =

Type of turreted ironclad warship

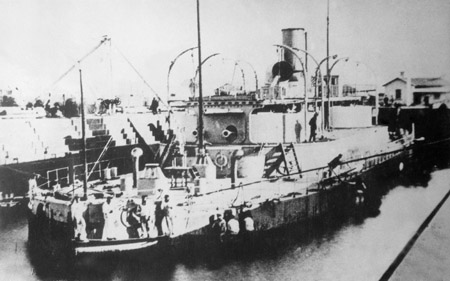
Stern view of HMVS Cerberus at Williamstown, Victoria, Australia, in 1871. Note the low freeboard.

A breastwork monitor was a type of turreted ironclad warship, modified from the principle of the monitor. By its arrangement of turrets fore-and-aft of a central superstructure, the development of the breastwork monitor can be seen as a major evolutionary step between the traditional ship of the line and the pre-dreadnought battleship.

The USS Monitor was a warship built in the United States in 1861, designed by John Ericsson and distinguished by the first rotating gun turret, designed by Theodore Timby. The modified design known as a breastwork monitor was introduced by Sir Edward Reed, the Chief Constructor of the Royal Navy between 1863 and 1870. The original monitors were very stable, and difficult to damage by gunfire, because of their very low freeboard. This, however, caused them to behave, some said, as a "half-tide rock", with the ever-present risk of being swamped in a sea should water gain access to the interior through hatches, turret bases or other openings in the deck.

Reed proposed to overcome this risk by the addition of an armoured breastwork. This was an armoured superstructure of moderate height (7 feet (2.1 m) in HMVS Cerberus), centrally placed on the ship and containing within its armoured circumference the gun turrets, bridge, funnels and all other upper deck appurtenances needed to operate the ship. The presence of this breastwork allowed the ship to operate without fear of being flooded by waves breaking over the deck, and allowed the main armament to be positioned at a greater height than in the American monitors, gaining thereby greater command and range, while preserving the defensive advantage of low freeboard.

Reed's concept was copied by other designers and breastwork monitors served in the French and Imperial Russian Navies, among others.

== See also ==
- List of breastwork monitors of the Royal Navy
