= RML 10-inch 18-ton gun =

Ordnance RML 10-inch 18-ton gun
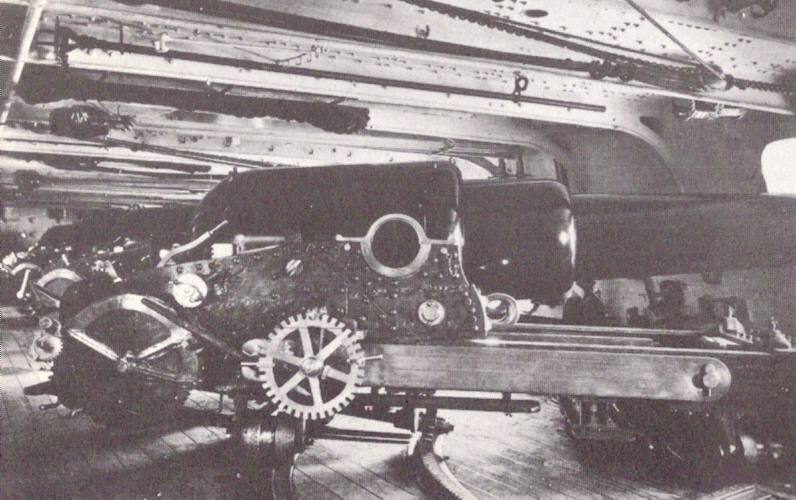
- Mk I gun on broadside ironclad HMS Sultan in the 1890s
- Type: Naval gun Coastal gun
- Place of origin: United Kingdom

Service history
- In service: 1868–1904?
- Used by: Royal Navy; Australian Colonies; Ottoman Empire
- Wars: Bombardment of Alexandria

Production history
- Designer: M Robert Fraser, Royal Gun Factory
- Designed: 1868
- Manufacturer: Royal Arsenal
- Unit cost: £1,006
- Variants: Mks I – II

Specifications
- Barrel length: 145.5 inches (3.70 m) (bore)
- Shell: 400 to 410 pounds (181.4 to 186.0 kg) Palliser, Common, Shrapnel
- Calibre: 10-inch (254.0 mm)
- Muzzle velocity: Palliser : 1,364 feet per second (416 m/s); Common & shrapnel : 1,028 feet per second (313 m/s)
- Maximum firing range: 6,000 yards (5,500 m)

The RML 10-inch guns Mk I – Mk II were large rifled muzzle-loading guns designed for British battleships and monitors in the 1860s to 1880s. They were also fitted to the Bouncer and Ant-class flat-iron gunboats. They were also used for fixed coastal defences around the United Kingdom and around the British Empire until the early years of the 20th century.

== Design ==
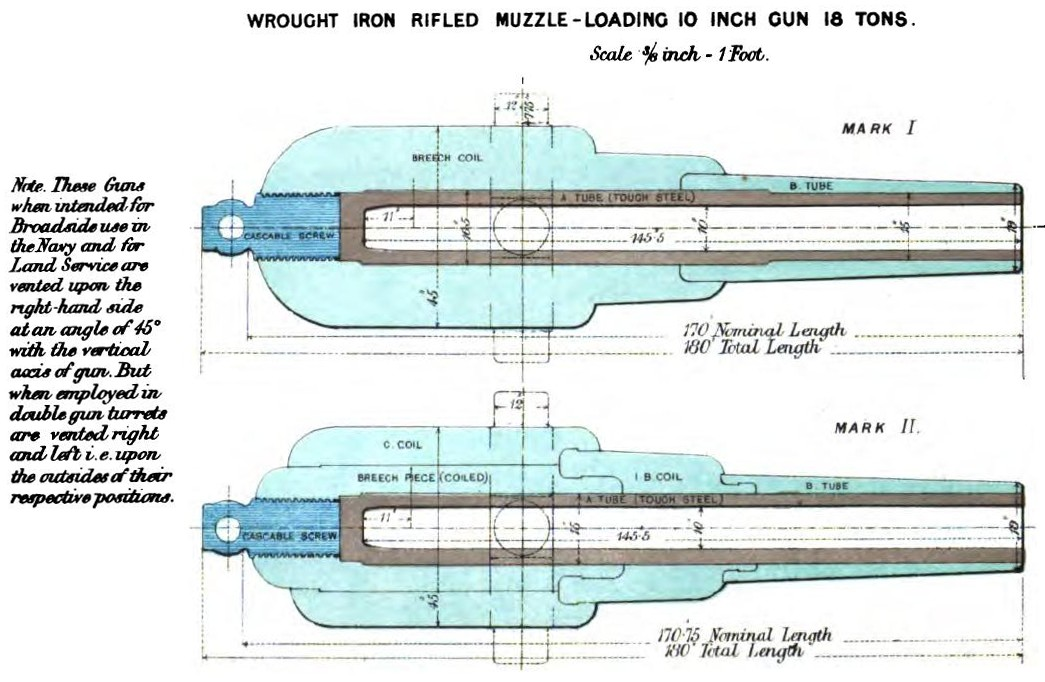
Mk I & MK II gun barrels

The 10 in (25 cm) gun was a standard "Woolwich" design (characterised by having a steel A tube with relatively few broad, rounded and shallow rifling grooves) developed in 1868, based on the successful Mk III 9 in (23 cm) gun, itself based on the "Fraser" system. The Fraser system was an economy measure applied to the successful Armstrong design for heavy muzzle-loaders, which were expensive to produce. It retained the Armstrong steel barrel surrounded by wrought-iron coils under tension, but replaced the multiple thin wrought-iron coils shrunk around it by a single larger coil (10 in (25 cm) Mark I) or 2 coils (Mark II); the trunnion ring was now welded to other coils; and it eliminated Armstrong's expensive forged breech-piece.

The gun was rifled with 7 grooves, increasing from 1 turn in 100 calibres to 1 in 40.

It was first used for the main armament on the central battery ironclad HMS Hercules, completed in late 1868.

A number of the Mk I guns on HMS Hercules and one of the two damaged guns in HMVS Cerberus suffered from cracked barrels. Presumably this is why only a few (at least 25) Mk I guns were made.

== Ammunition ==
When the gun was first introduced projectiles had several rows of "studs" which engaged with the gun's rifling to impart spin. Sometime after 1878, "attached gas-checks" were fitted to the bases of the studded shells, reducing wear on the guns and improving their range and accuracy. Subsequently, "automatic gas-checks" were developed which could rotate shells, allowing the deployment of a new range of studless ammunition. Thus, any particular gun potentially operated with a mix of studded and studless ammunition.

The gun's primary projectile was "Palliser" shot or shell, an early armour-piercing projectile for attacking armoured warships. A large "battering charge" of 70 lb (32 kg) "P" (pebble) or 60 lb (27 kg) "R.L.G." (rifle large grain) gunpowder was used for the Palliser projectile to achieve maximum velocity and hence penetrating capability.

Common (i.e. ordinary explosive) shells and shrapnel shells were fired with the standard "full service charge" of 44 lb (20 kg) "P" or 40 lb (18 kg) R.L.G. gunpowder, as for these velocity was not as important.

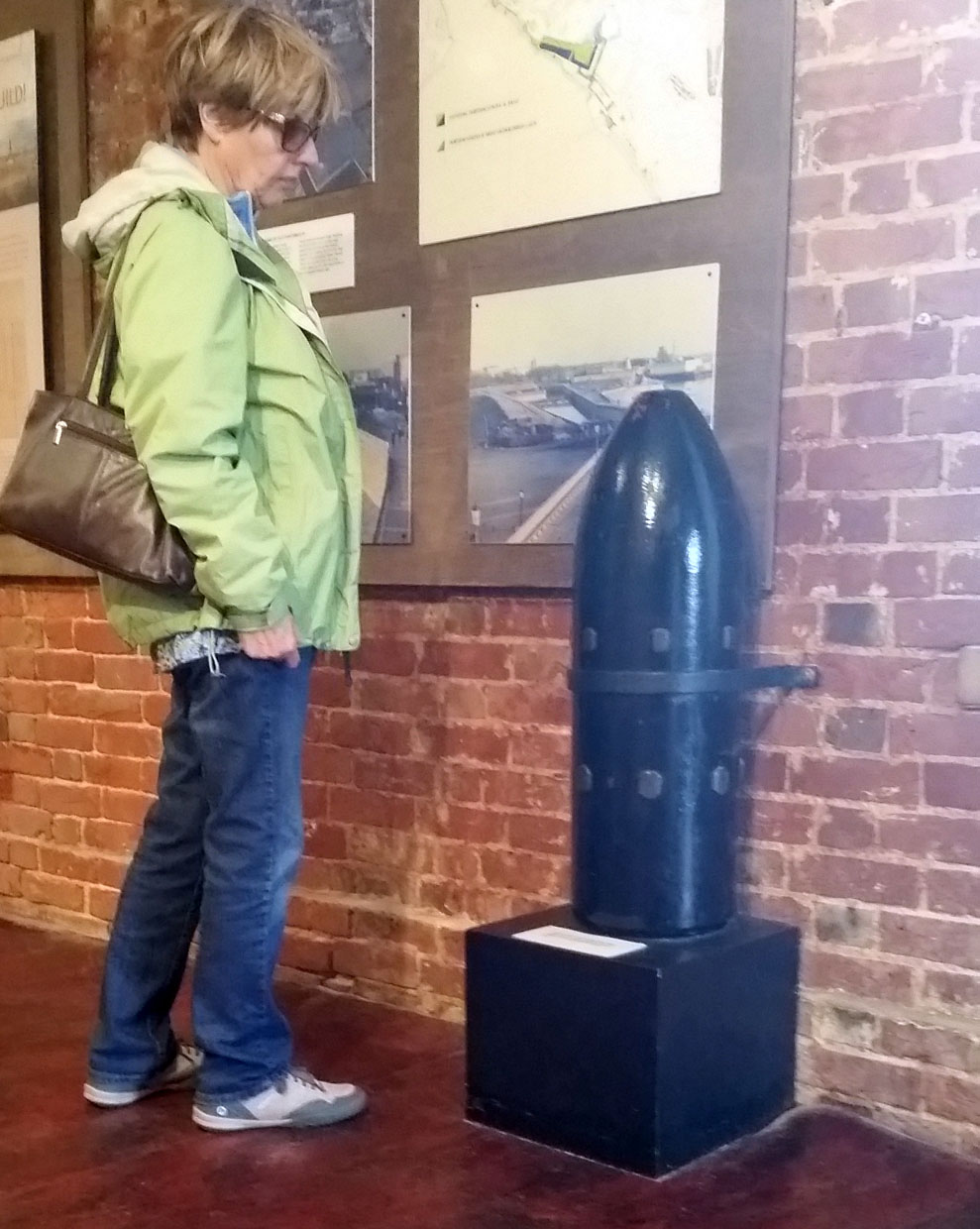
Studded shell without gas-check. Southsea Castle UK

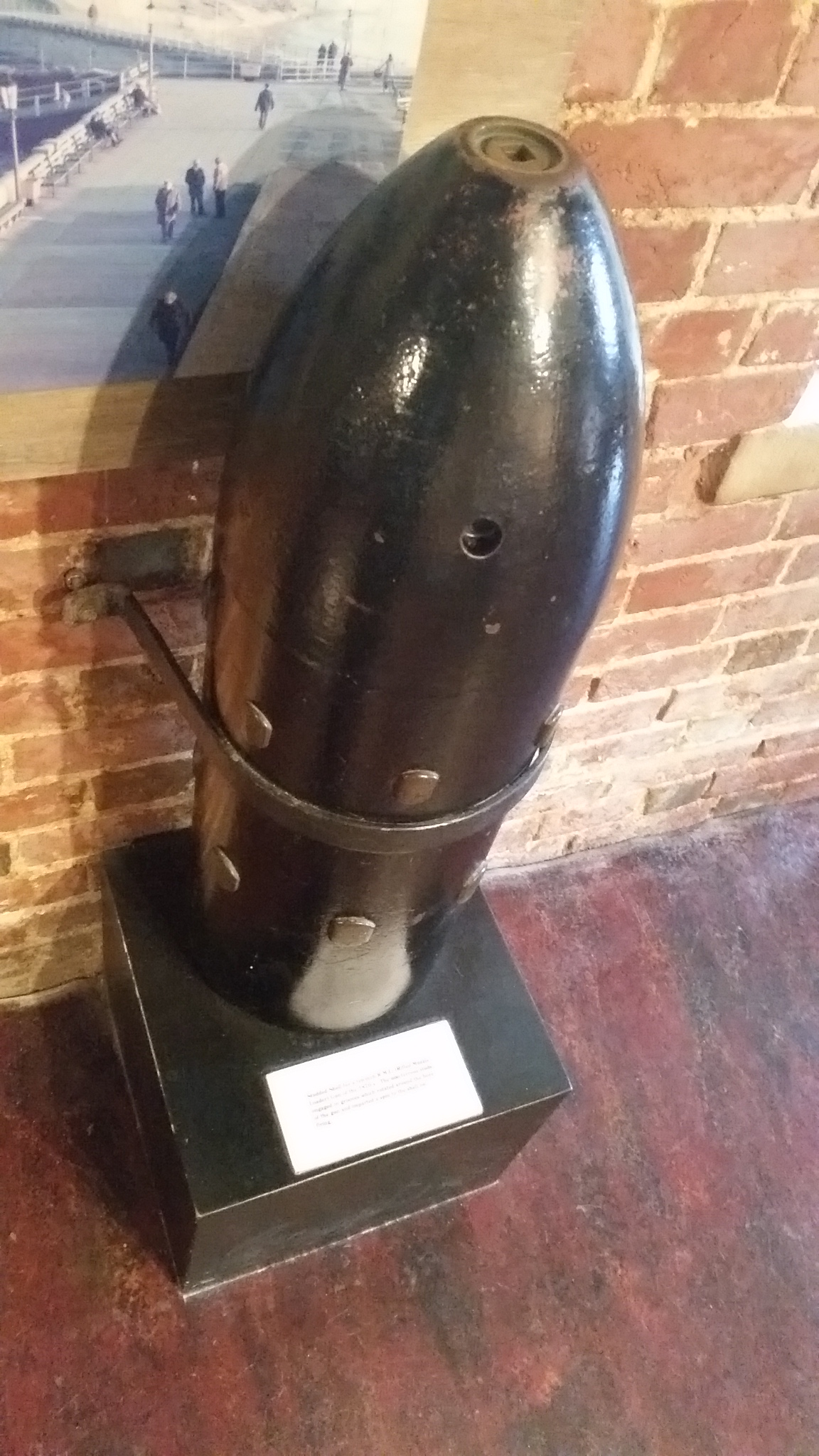
Studded shell without gas-check. Southsea Castle UK

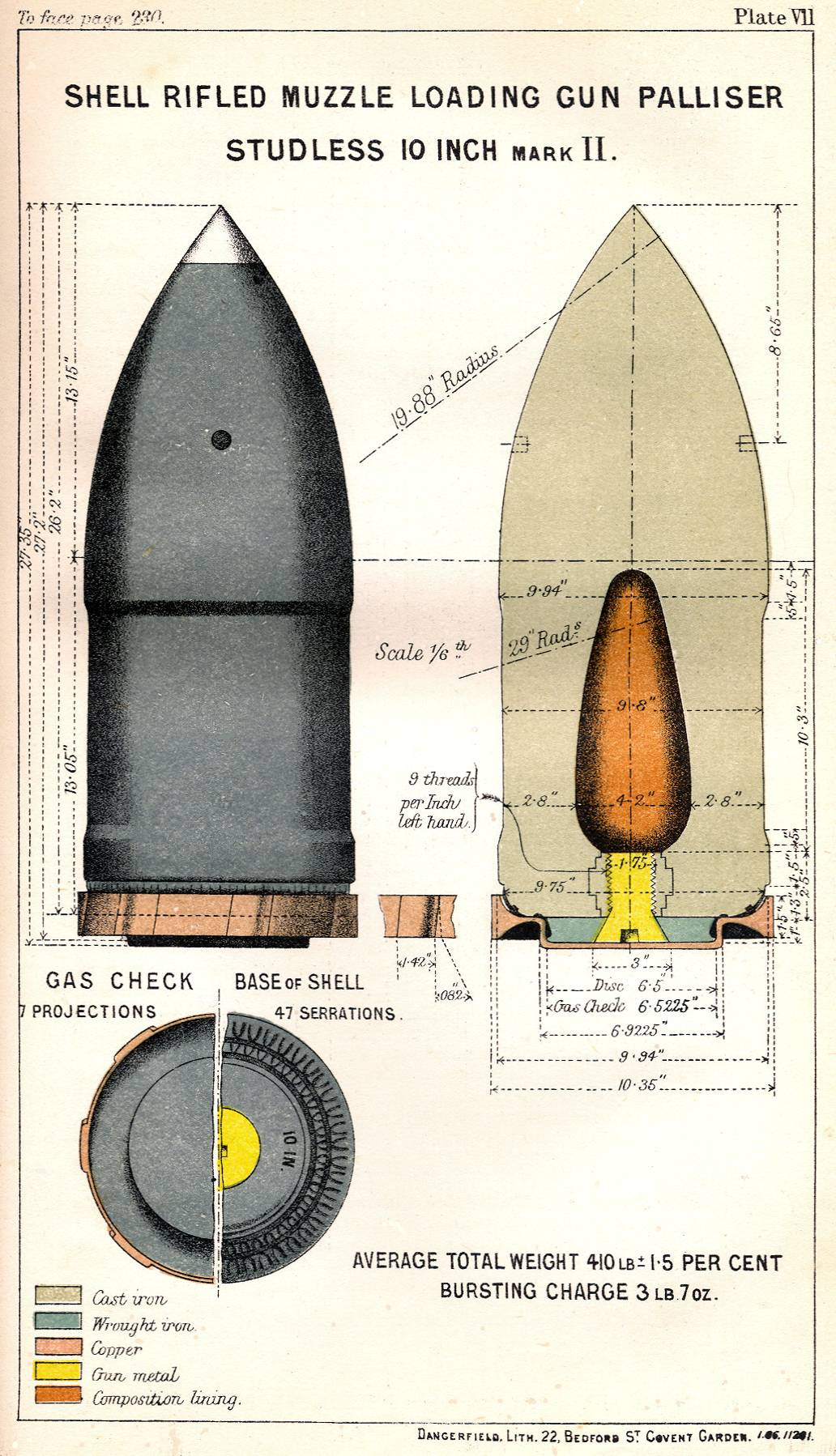
Studless Palliser shell, 410 lb, 1886

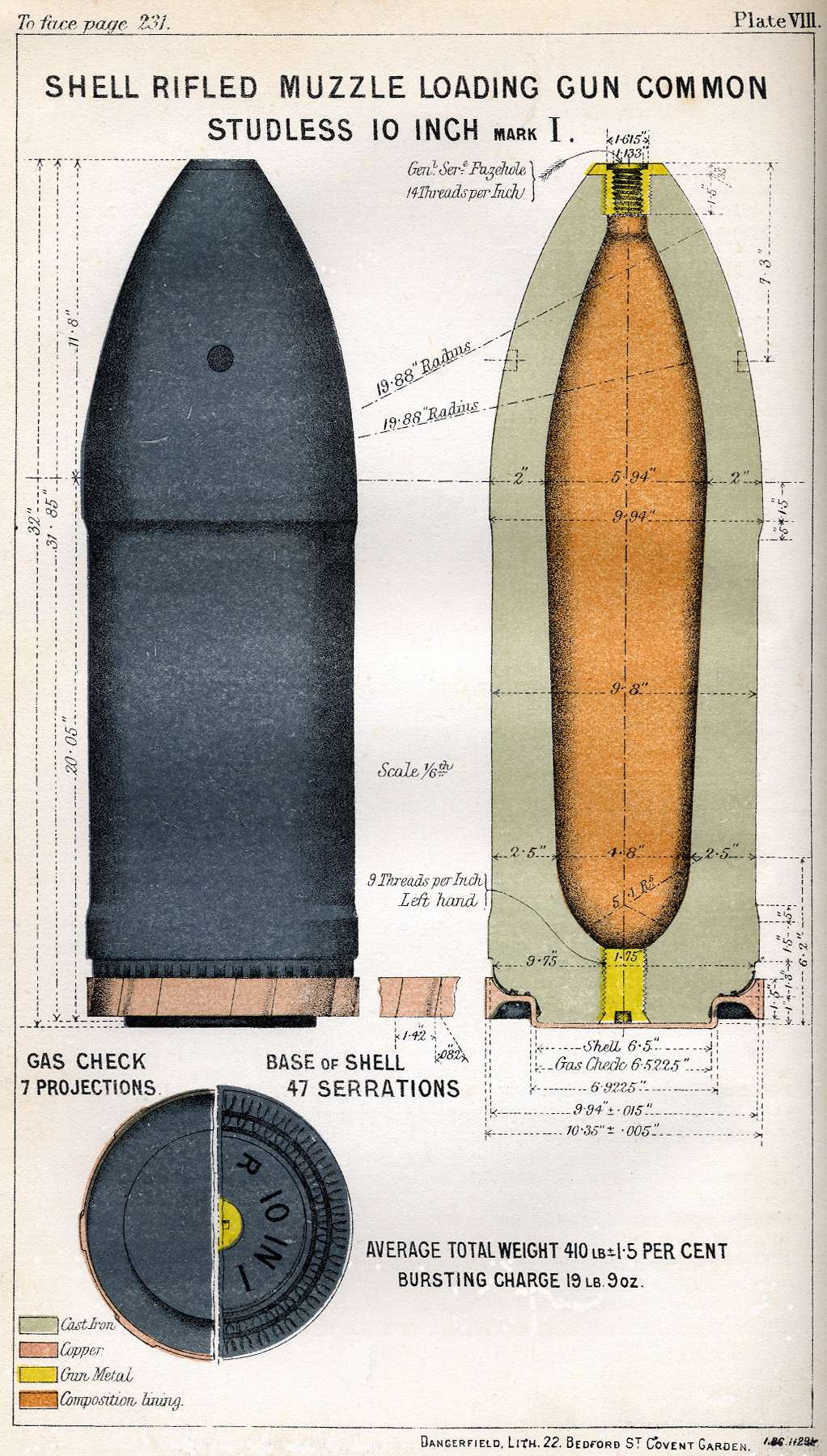
Studless Common shell, 410 lb, 1886

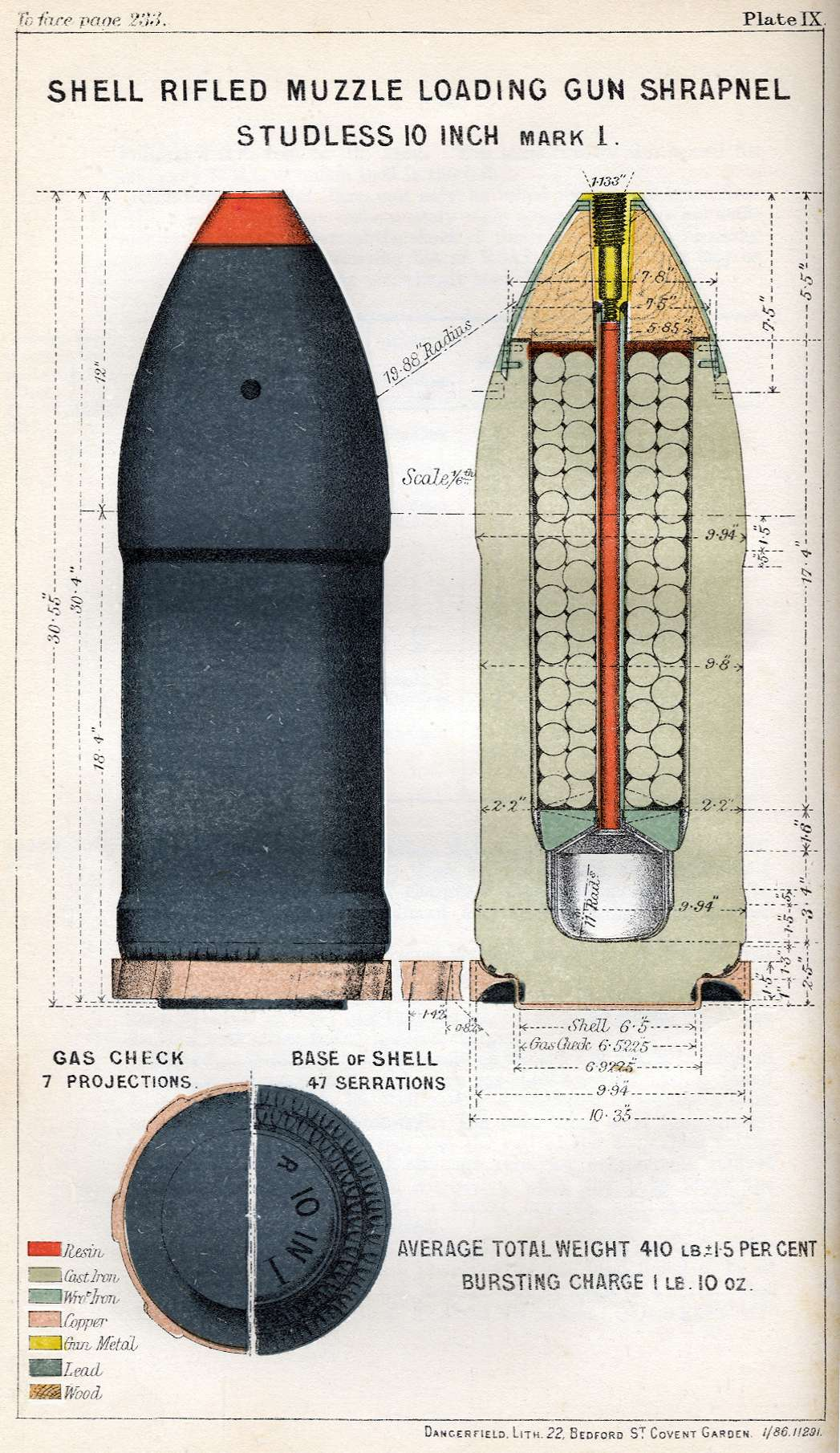
Studless Shrapnel shell, 410 lb, 1886

== Surviving examples ==
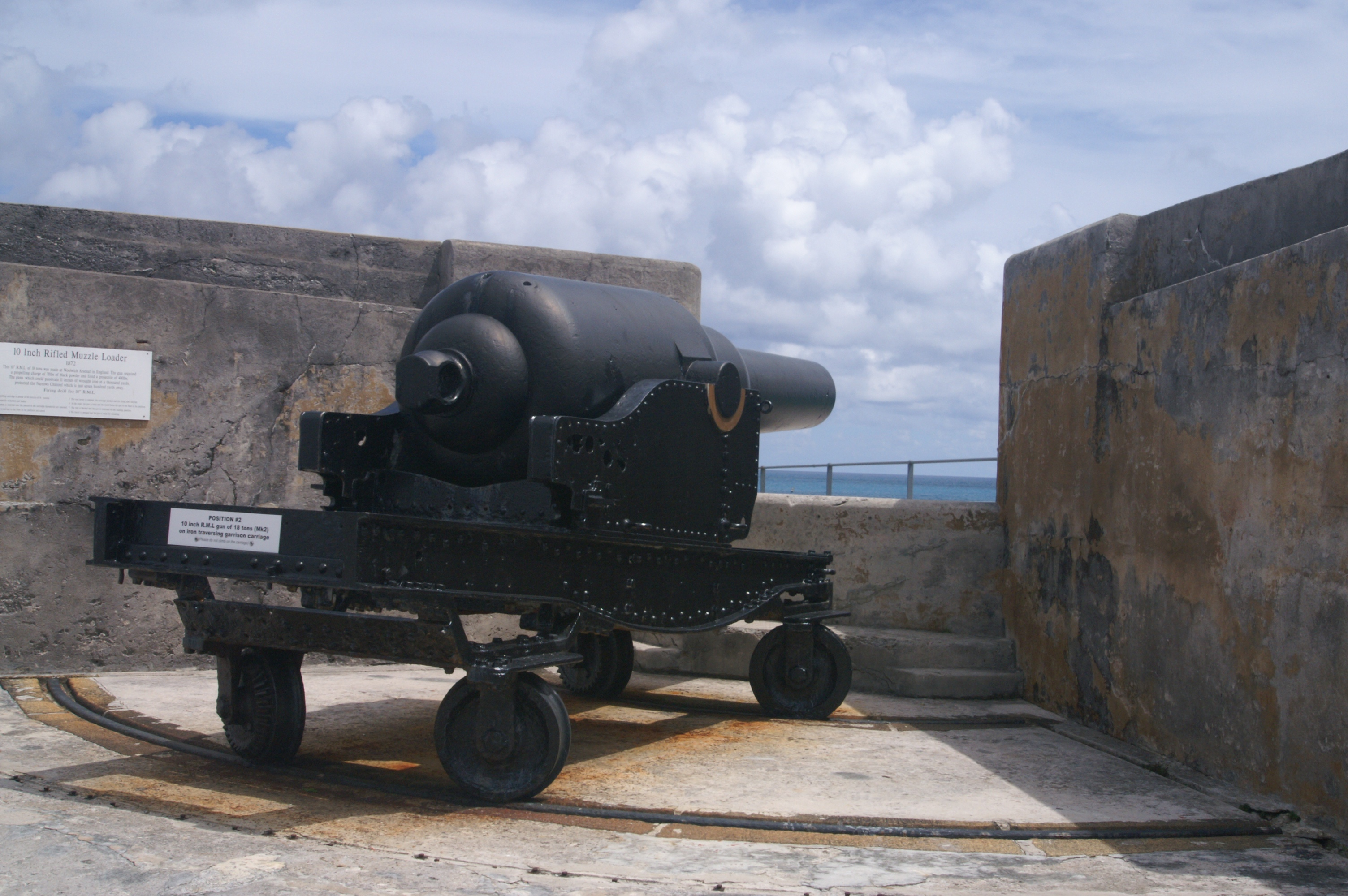
One of the RML 10 in (25 cm) Mk II gun of Fort Albert, currently mounted at Fort St Catherine, Bermuda

- 4 guns submerged near the remains of HMVS Cerberus in Half Moon Bay, Victoria, Australia (3 x Mk I & 1 x Mk II)
- Damaged Mk I gun No. 17 from HMVS Cerberus is on display at HMAS Cerberus Victoria, Australia
- Mark II gun No.35 at Parson's Lodge Battery, Gibraltar
- Mark II gun no.38 at York Redoubt, Halifax, Canada
- Mark II gun No. 67 at Southport Gates, Gibraltar
- Mk II guns Mark II guns numbers 156, 180 (dated 1871), 195, 221 and 224 at Fort St. Catherine, St George's Island, Bermuda (Guns were originally from Fort Albert)
- Mark II No. 273 at Almeda Gardens, Gibraltar
- Mark II guns, numbers 338, 340, 342, 356 and 357, dated 1878, Fort Cunningham, Paget Island, Bermuda
- A Mark II at the Citadel, Quebec City, Canada
- A single gun at Chapel Bay Fort, United Kingdom

One 10 in (25 cm) Mk I Common Shell, one 10 in (25 cm) Mk II Common Shell & one 10 in (25 cm) Mk III Palliser Shot as part of the Victorian Navy display at the Geelong Maritime Museum, Australia. Details

Various other guns are mounted or unmounted in Bermuda, with some lying outside of Fort St Catherine, having been rolled out when made obsolete (the guns actually mounted on display there were taken from other forts, notably Fort Albert), and a number having been found buried in the moat of Fort Cunningham (the two mounted at Fort George are the RML 11 in (28 cm) 25-ton gun). Three have been erected on concrete display stands at Fort Hamilton, though the original mounts are missing, and another at Alexandria Battery.

== See also ==
- List of naval guns

== Bibliography ==
- Treatise on the construction and manufacture of ordnance in the British service. War Office, UK, 1877
- Treatise on Ammunition. 2nd Edition 1877. War Office, UK.
- Manual for Victorian naval forces 1887. HMVS Cerberus website
- Treatise on Ammunition, 4th Edition 1887. War Office, UK.
- Sir Thomas Brassey, The British Navy, Volume II. London: Longmans, Green and Co. 1882
- Handbook for the 10-inch rifled muzzle-loading gun of 18 tons, 1899 at State Library of Victoria
- "Handbook for the 10-inch R.M.L. Guns (Land Service)", 1903, London. Published by His Majesty's Stationery Office at State Library of Victoria
