= Breastwork (fortification) =

Fortification

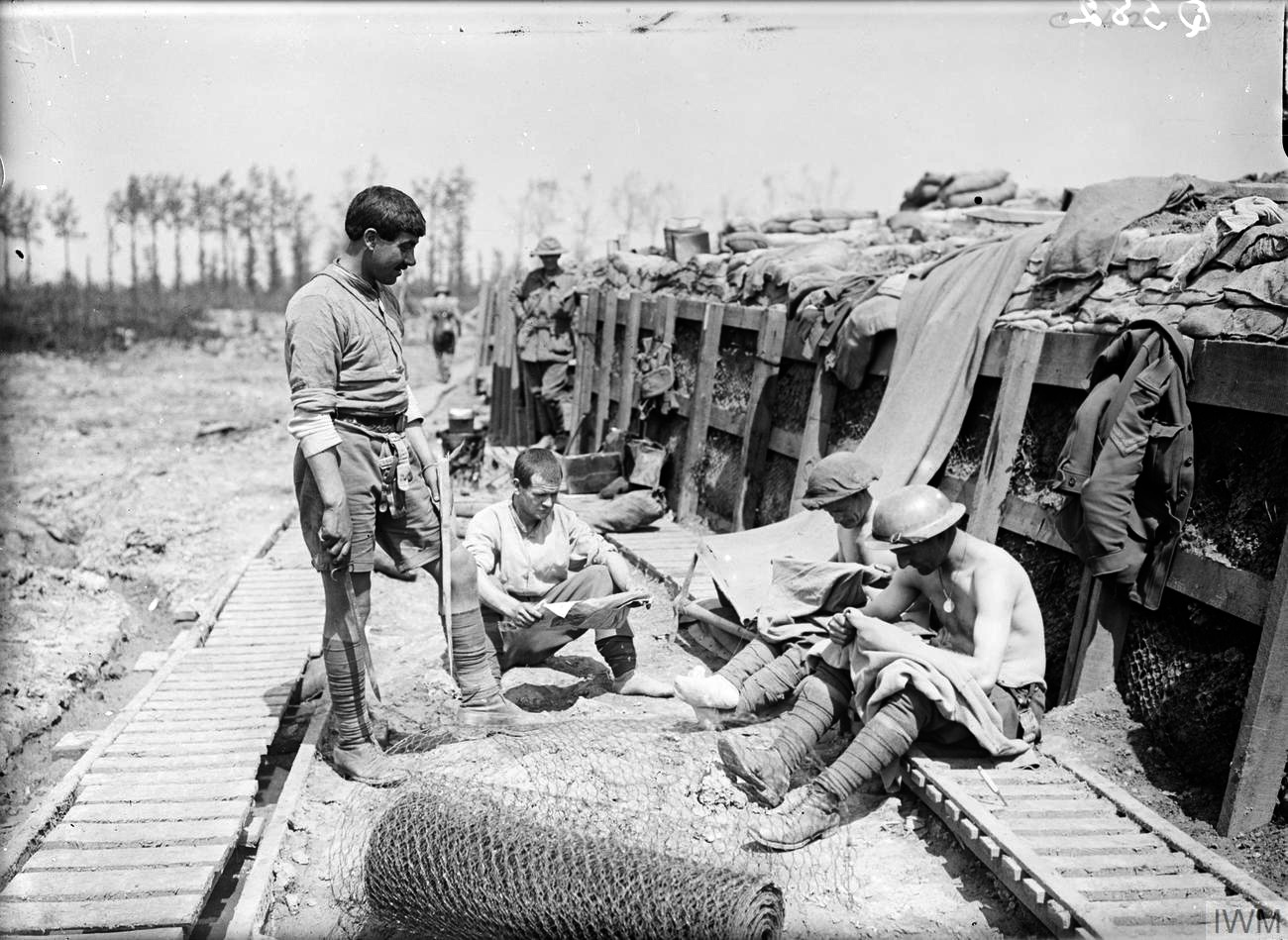
Breastwork at Armentières in 1916, during World War I

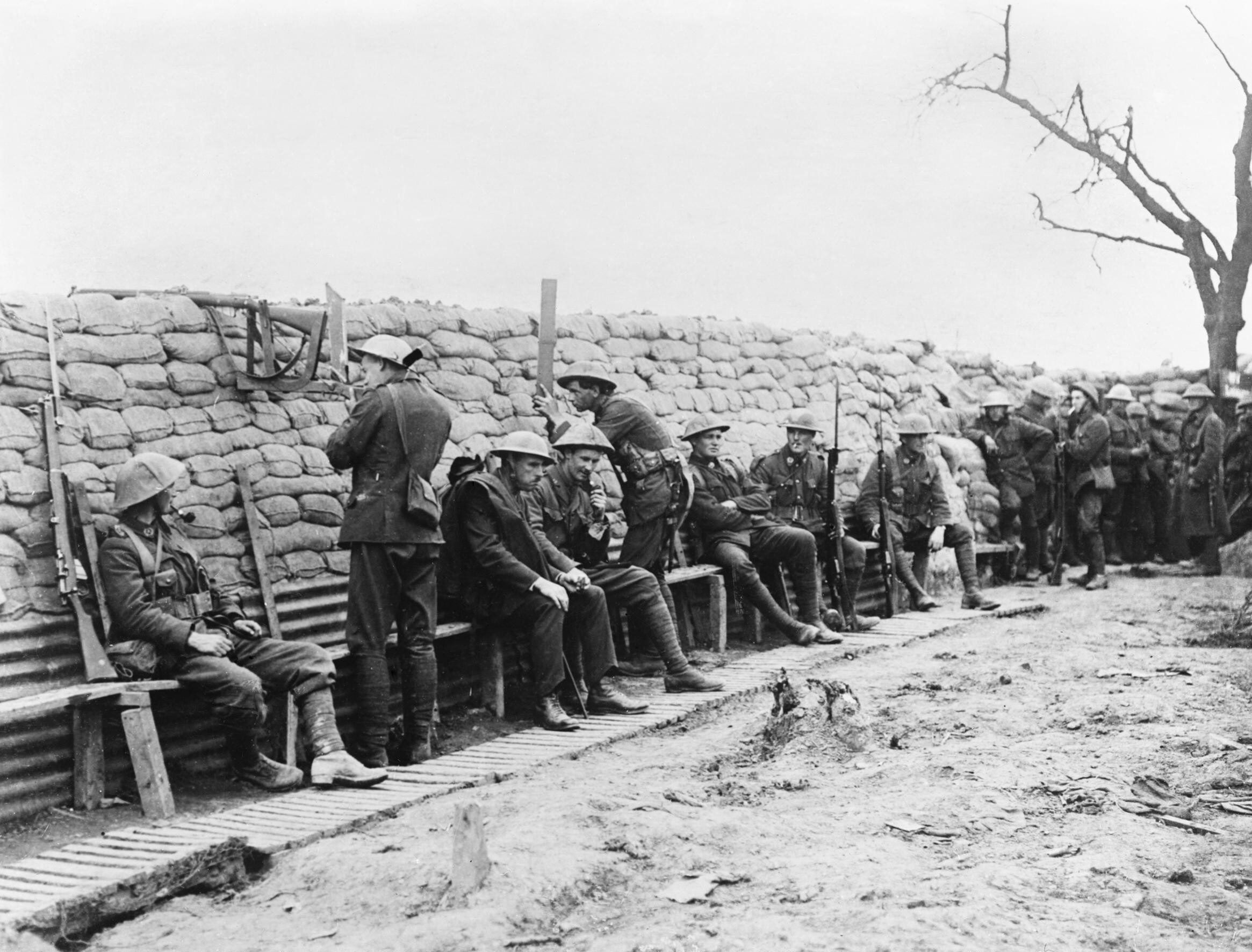
New Zealand troops of the 9th (Wellington East Coast Rifles) Regiment holding a well-constructed breastwork near Fleurbaix, June 1916. Note one of the troops using a periscope rifle.

A breastwork is a temporary fortification, often an earthwork thrown up to breast or shoulder height to provide protection to defenders firing over it from a standing position. A more permanent structure, normally in stone, would be described as a parapet or the battlement of a castle wall.

In warships, a breastwork is the armored superstructure in the ship that did not extend all the way out to the sides of the ship. It was generally only used in ironclad turret ships designed between 1865 and 1880.

== See also ==
- List of established military terms
