= Turret ship =

19th-century warship type

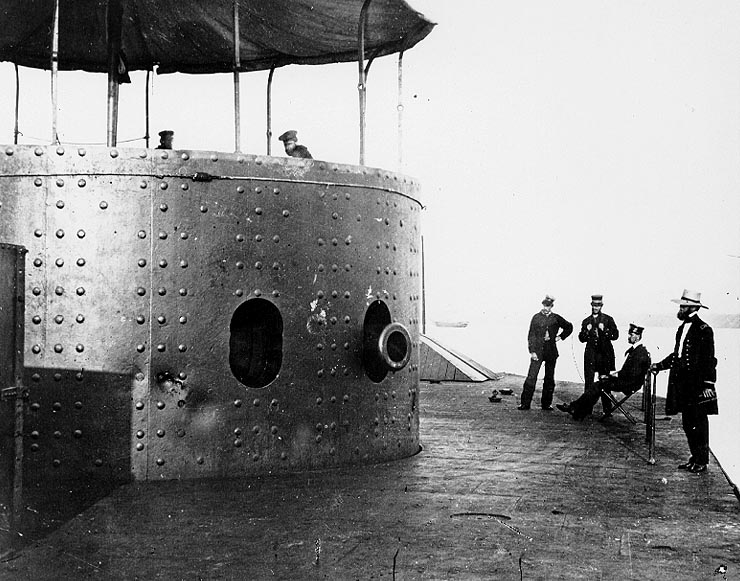
Turret of USS Monitor, one of the first turret-armed warships

Turret ships were a 19th-century type of warship, the earliest to have their guns mounted in a revolving gun turret, instead of a broadside arrangement.

== Background ==
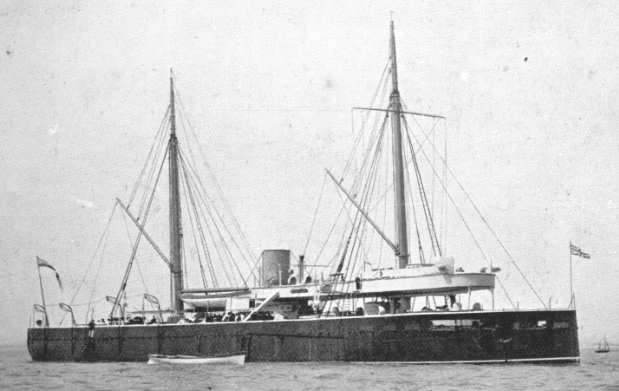
HMS Prince Albert, a pioneering turret ship, built by naval engineer Cowper Phipps Coles.

Before the development of large-calibre, long-range guns in the mid-19th century, the classic ship of the line design used rows of port-mounted guns on each side of the ship, often mounted in casemates. Firepower was provided by a large number of guns which could only be aimed in a limited arc from one side of the ship. Due to instability, fewer larger and heavier guns can be carried on a ship. Also, the casemates often sat near the waterline, which made them vulnerable to flooding and restricted their use to calm seas.

Turrets were weapon mounts designed to protect the crew and mechanism of the artillery piece and with the capability of being aimed and fired in many directions as a rotating weapon platform. This platform can be mounted on a fortified building or structure such as an anti-naval land battery, or on a combat vehicle, a naval ship, or a military aircraft.

== Origins ==
Designs for a rotating gun turret date back to the late 18th century. Practical rotating turret warships were independently developed in Great Britain and the United States with the availability of steam power in the mid-19th century.

=== British developments ===
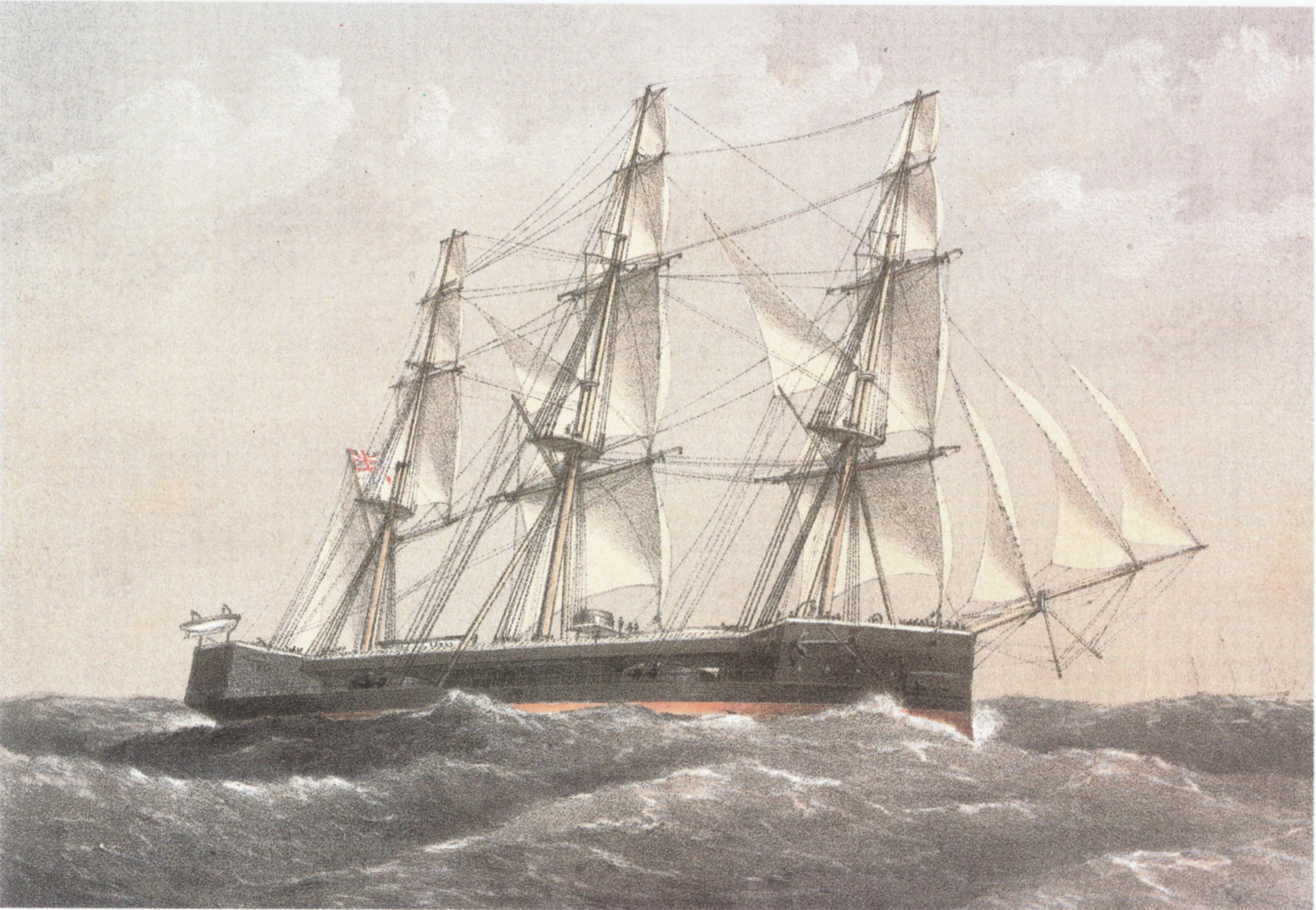
HMS Captain was one of the first ocean-going turret ships.

During the Crimean War, Captain Cowper Phipps Coles of the British Royal Navy constructed a raft with guns protected by a 'cupola' and used the raft, named Lady Nancy, to shell the Russian town of Taganrog in the Black Sea. Lady Nancy "proved a great success", and Coles patented his rotating turret after the war. Following Coles' patenting, the British Admiralty ordered a prototype of Coles' design in 1859, which was installed in the floating battery vessel, HMS Trusty, for trials in 1861, becoming the first vessel to be fitted with a revolving gun turret. Coles' design aim was to create a ship with the greatest possible all round arc of fire, as low in the water as possible to minimise the target.

The British Admiralty accepted the principle of the gun turret as a useful innovation, and incorporated it into other new designs. Coles submitted a design for a ship having ten domed turrets each housing two large guns. The design was rejected as impractical, although the Admiralty remained interested in turret ships and instructed its own designers to create better designs.

Coles enlisted the support of Prince Albert, who wrote to the First Lord of the Admiralty, the Duke of Somerset, supporting the construction of a turret ship. In January 1862, the Admiralty agreed to construct a ship, HMS Prince Albert, which had four turrets and a low freeboard, intended only for coastal defence. Coles was allowed to design the turrets, but the ship was the responsibility of the Chief Constructor Isaac Watts.

Another of Coles's designs, HMS Royal Sovereign, was completed in August 1864. Its existing broadside guns were replaced with four turrets on a flat deck and the ship was fitted with 5.5 inches (140 mm) of armour in a belt around the waterline. Early ships like USS Monitor and Royal Sovereign had little sea-keeping qualities being limited to coastal waters. Coles, in collaboration with Sir Edward James Reed, went on to design and build HMS Monarch, the first seagoing warship to carry her guns in turrets. Laid down in 1866 and completed in June 1869, it carried two turrets, although the inclusion of a forecastle and poop deck prevented the guns firing fore and aft.

=== American developments ===
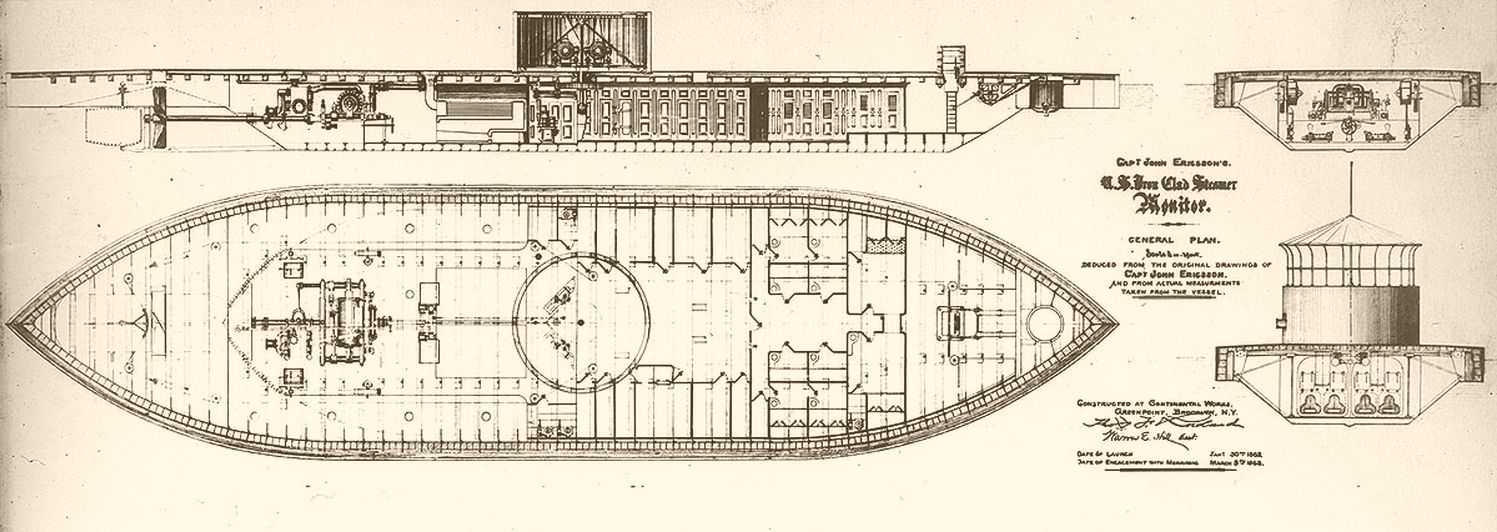
Inboard plans of USS Monitor.

The gun turret was independently invented by the Swedish inventor John Ericsson in the United States. Ericsson designed USS Monitor in 1861. Ericsson's most prominent design feature was a large cylindrical gun turret mounted amidships above the low-freeboard upper hull, also called the "raft". The raft extended well past the sides of the lower, more traditionally shaped lower hull. A small armoured pilot house was fitted on the upper deck towards the bow, however, its position prevented Monitor from firing her guns straight forward. (Note: Ericsson later admitted that this was a serious flaw in the ship's design and that the pilot house should have been placed atop the turret.) One of Ericsson's prime goals in designing the ship was to present the smallest possible target to enemy gunfire.

The turret's rounded shape helped to deflect cannon shot. A pair of donkey engines rotated the turret through a set of gears; a full rotation was made in 22.5 seconds during testing on 9 February 1862. This design was technologically inferior to Coles', and made fine control of the turret difficult. If turret rotation overshot its mark it was difficult to make a correction. Either the engine would have to be placed in reverse or another full rotation was necessary.

Including the guns, the turret weighed approximately 160 long tons (163 t); the entire weight rested on an iron spindle that had to be jacked up using a wedge before the turret could rotate. The spindle was 9 inches (23 cm) in diameter, which gave it ten times the strength needed in preventing the turret from sliding sideways. When not in use, the turret rested on a brass ring on the deck that was intended to form a watertight seal. In service, however, this proved to leak heavily, despite caulking by the crew. The gap between the turret and the deck proved to be a problem as debris and shell fragments entered the gap and jammed the turrets of several Passaic-class monitors, which used the same turret design, during the First Battle of Charleston Harbor in April 1863. Direct hits at the turret with heavy shot also had the potential to bend the spindle, which could also jam the turret.

The turret was intended to mount a pair of 15-inch (381 mm) smoothbore Dahlgren guns, but they were not ready in time and 11-inch (279 mm) guns were substituted. Each gun weighed approximately 16,000 pounds (7,300 kg). Monitor's guns used the standard propellant charge of 15 pounds (6.8 kg) specified by the 1860 ordnance for targets "distant", "near", and "ordinary", established by the gun's designer Dahlgren himself. They could fire a 136-pound (61.7 kg) round shot or shell up to a range of 3,650 yards (3,340 m) at an elevation of +15°.

== Culmination ==
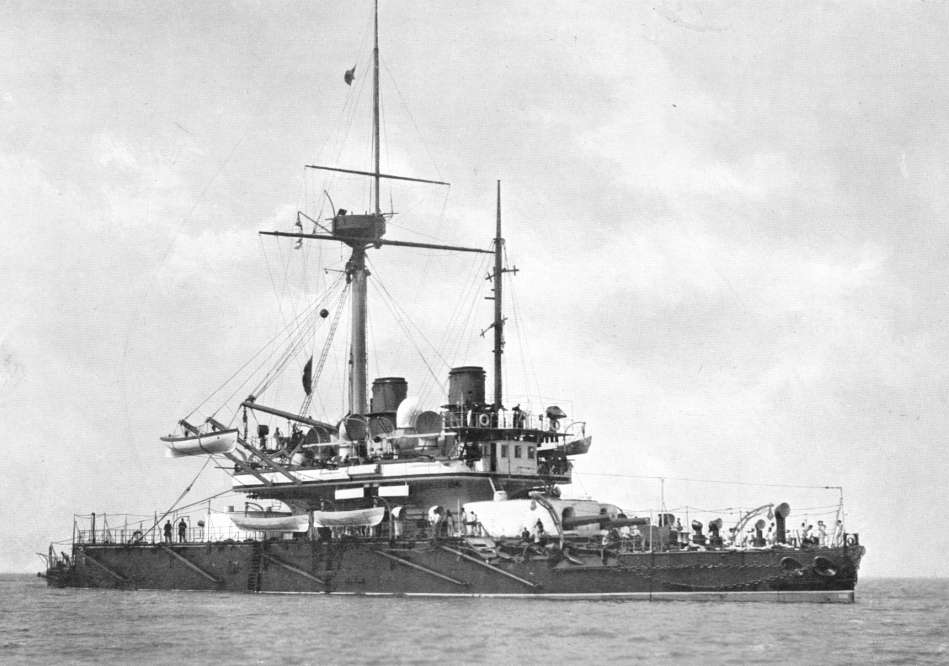
HMS Thunderer incorporated hydraulic mechanisms into the turret, and marked the transition toward the modern battleship.

HMS Devastation of 1871 and HMS Thunderer of 1872 represented the culmination of this pioneering work. These ironclad turret ships were designed by Edward James Reed. They were also the world's first mastless battleships, built with a central superstructure layout, and became the prototype for all subsequent warships, leading directly to the modern battleship.

== Surviving examples ==
- The only preserved steam and sail turret ship in Europe is the mid 19th century Dutch ironclad HNLMS Schorpioen.
- The Chilean and Peruvian flagship Huascar is a memorial at Talcahuano.
- A replica of the Chinese battleship Dingyuan was built as a museum ship in 2003.

== See also ==
- Barbette ship
