= HMS Captain (1869) =

British warship

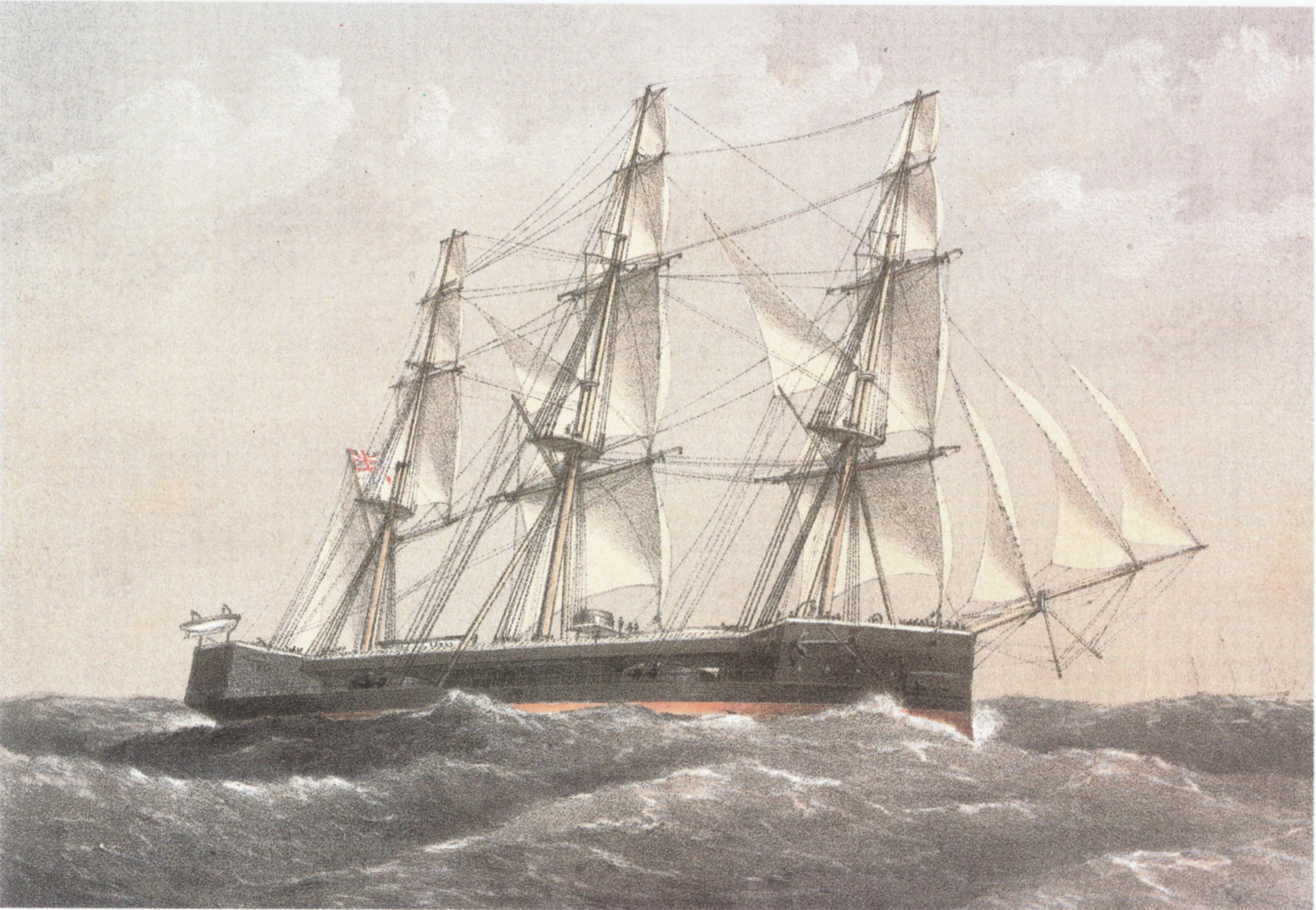
- Lithograph of Captain at sea

History

United Kingdom
- Ordered: November 1866
- Builder: Laird Brothers, Birkenhead
- Laid down: 30 January 1867
- Launched: 27 March 1869
- Commissioned: April 1870
- Fate: Sunk; 7 September 1870

General characteristics
- Displacement: As designed: 6,960 long tons (7,070 t); As built: 7,767 long tons (7,892 t)
- Length: 320 ft (97.54 m) pp
- Beam: 53 ft 3 in (16.23 m)
- Draught: 24 ft 10 in (7.57 m)
- Propulsion: 2-shaft, reciprocating 4 cylinder horizontal trunk engine; 8 rectangular boilers; 5,400 ihp (4,000 kW)
- Sail plan: Ship rig: 37,990 sq ft (3,529 m^{2}) of sail (max)
- Speed: 15.25 kn (28.24 km/h; 17.55 mph) (steam power)
- Complement: 500 crewmen and officers
- Armament: 4 × 12-inch 25-ton muzzle-loading rifles (2 × 2); 2 × 7-inch 6.5-ton muzzle-loading rifles (2 × 1)
- Armour: Belt: 4–8 in (100–200 mm); Turrets: 9–10 in (230–250 mm); 7 in (180 mm)

HMS Captain was a major warship built for the Royal Navy as a semi-private venture, following a dispute between the designer and the Admiralty. With wrought-iron armour, steam propulsion, and the main battery mounted in rotating armoured turrets, the ship was, at first appearance, quite innovative and formidable. However, poor design and design changes resulted in a vessel that was overweight and ultimately unstable. In terms of seaworthiness she was reported as closely comparable to the higher freeboard turret-ship HMS Monarch, but her reduced freeboard added a sense of "sluggishness". The Captain capsized in heavy seas, only five months after being commissioned, with the loss of nearly 500 lives.

== Background ==
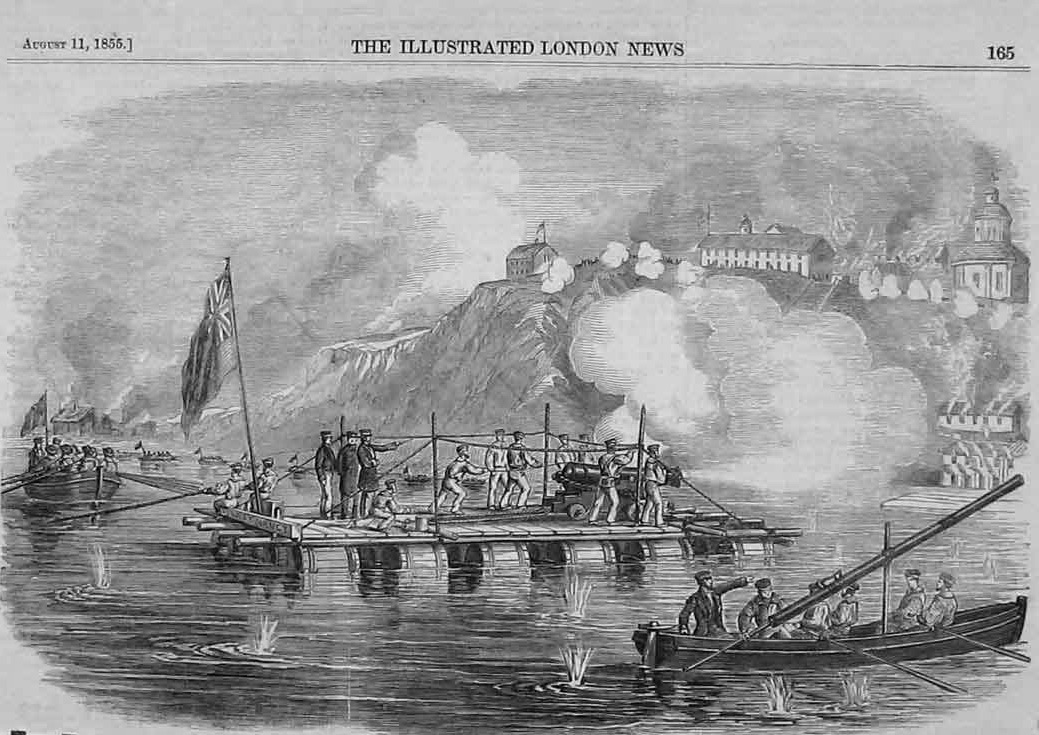
The Lady Nancy raft was the inspiration of the Captain's design

The history of the Captain can be traced back to the Crimean War and the experiences of British captain Cowper Phipps Coles in 1855. Coles and a group of British sailors constructed a raft with guns protected by a "cupola" and used the raft, named the Lady Nancy, to shell the Russian town of Taganrog on the Sea of Azov. The Lady Nancy "proved a great success", and Coles patented his rotating turret after the war. Following Coles' patenting, the British Admiralty ordered a prototype of Coles' design in 1859, which was installed in the floating battery vessel, HMS Trusty, for trials in 1861.

The trials with the Trusty impressed the Admiralty, and it ordered a coastal defence vessel, HMS Prince Albert, to be built with four of Coles' turrets and a wooden 121-gun first rate ship-of-the-line under construction, HMS Royal Sovereign, to be converted to a turret ship. The Prince Albert was completed with four turrets mounting single 12-ton 9-inch guns and 4.5-inch-thick (110 mm) armour plate on the hull. The Royal Sovereign had five 10.5-inch, 12.5-ton guns in one twin and three single turrets.

Both ships were flush deck with only a jury rig, and could only operate as coastal service vessels. The Admiralty, although impressed with Coles' rotating turret, required oceangoing vessels to protect its worldwide empire. Unfortunately for Coles, engine technology had not yet caught up with his designs and consequently oceangoing ships required sails. Combining rigging, masts, and turrets proved complicated if rigging was not to impede the turrets' arcs of fire.

In early 1863 the Admiralty gave Coles permission to work with Nathaniel Barnaby, head of staff of the Department of Naval Construction, on the design of a rigged vessel with two turrets and three tripod masts. In June 1863 the Admiralty suspended progress on the vessel until the Royal Sovereign finished her trials.

In 1864, Coles was allowed to start a second project: a rigged vessel with only one turret and based on the design of HMS Pallas. He was lent the services of Joseph Scullard, Chief Draughtsman of Portsmouth Dockyard.

The next year, 1865, a committee established by the Admiralty to study the new design concluded that while the turret should be adopted, Coles' one-turret warship design had inadequate fire arcs. The committee proposed a two-turret fully rigged vessel with either two 9-inch (12 ton) guns per turret, or one 12-inch (22 ton) gun per turret. The committee's proposal was accepted by the Admiralty, and construction was started on Monarch. Monarch's two turrets were each equipped with two 12-inch (25-ton) guns.

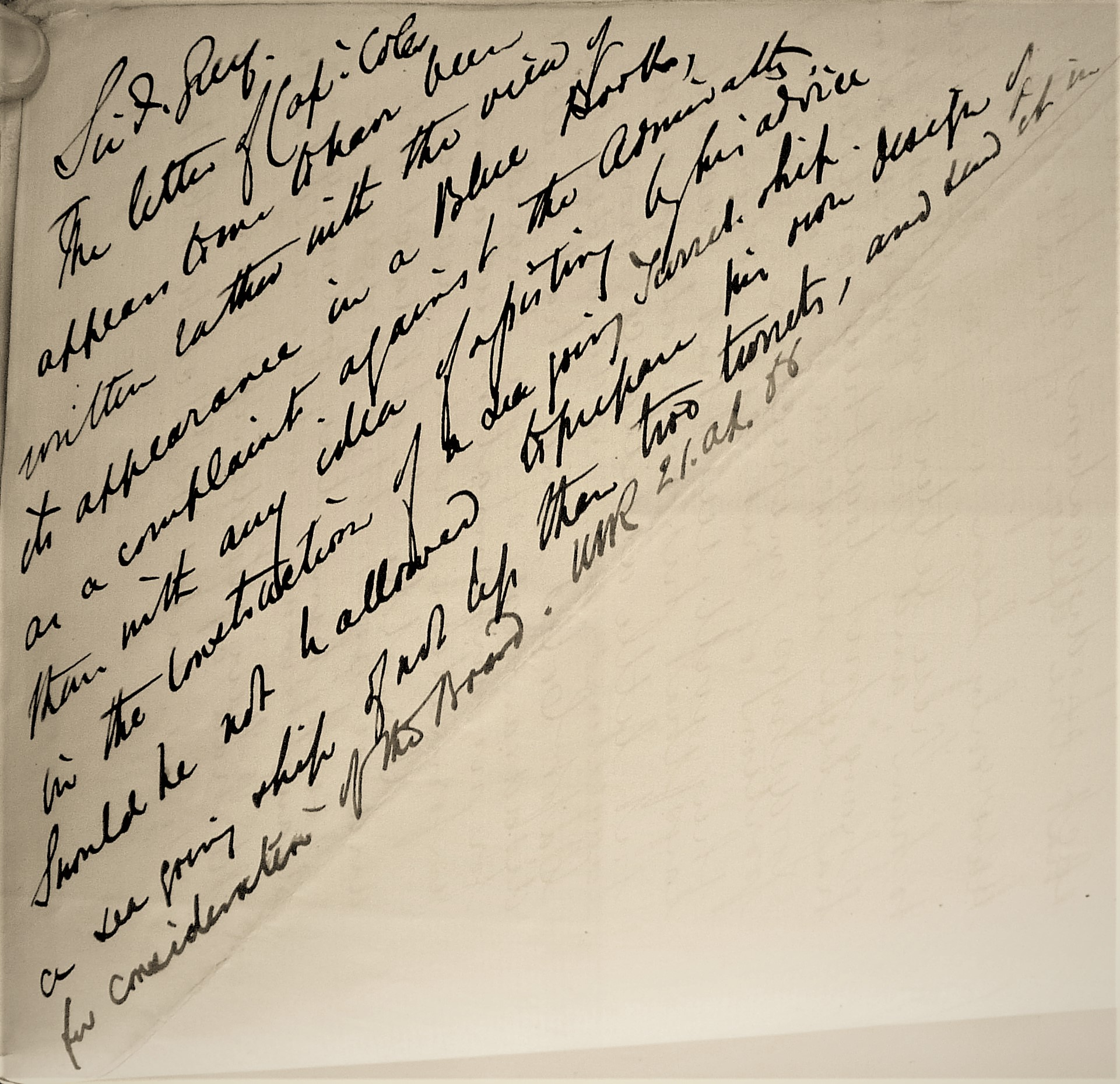
Minute by Admiral Sir Frederick Grey (First Naval Lord) dated 21 April 1866, suggesting the Admiralty sanction Coles to build a seagoing turret-ship of his own design (from UK National Archives, ADM 1/5974)

Stunned by the committee's decision to cancel his single-turret ship and his proposal for a two-turret vessel, and objecting to the Monarch's design, Coles launched a strong campaign against the project, attacking Vice Admiral Robert Spencer Robinson, Controller of the Navy, and various other members of the committee and the Admiralty. So vociferously did Coles complain that in January 1866 his contract as a consultant to the Admiralty was terminated. At the end of January, his protestations that he had been misunderstood led to his being re-employed from 1 March 1866. Further, Coles lobbied the press and Parliament, who were increasingly convinced that foreign powers—namely the United States—were pressing ahead with turret ships and thereby leaving Britain at a disadvantage at sea. On 17 April 1866, Coles submitted to the Admiralty his critique of the proposed Monarch (designed by the Controller's department and the Chief Constructor), stating that he could not publicly endorse a vessel which did not represent "my views of a sea going Turret-ship, nor can she give my principle a satisfactory and conclusive trial." Sensing that such an increasingly acrimonious and high-profile debate would only continue, the First Naval Lord, Admiral Sir Frederick Grey, minuted four days later (21 April) that Coles should at last be allowed to build what he felt would be a 'perfect' seagoing turret-ship.

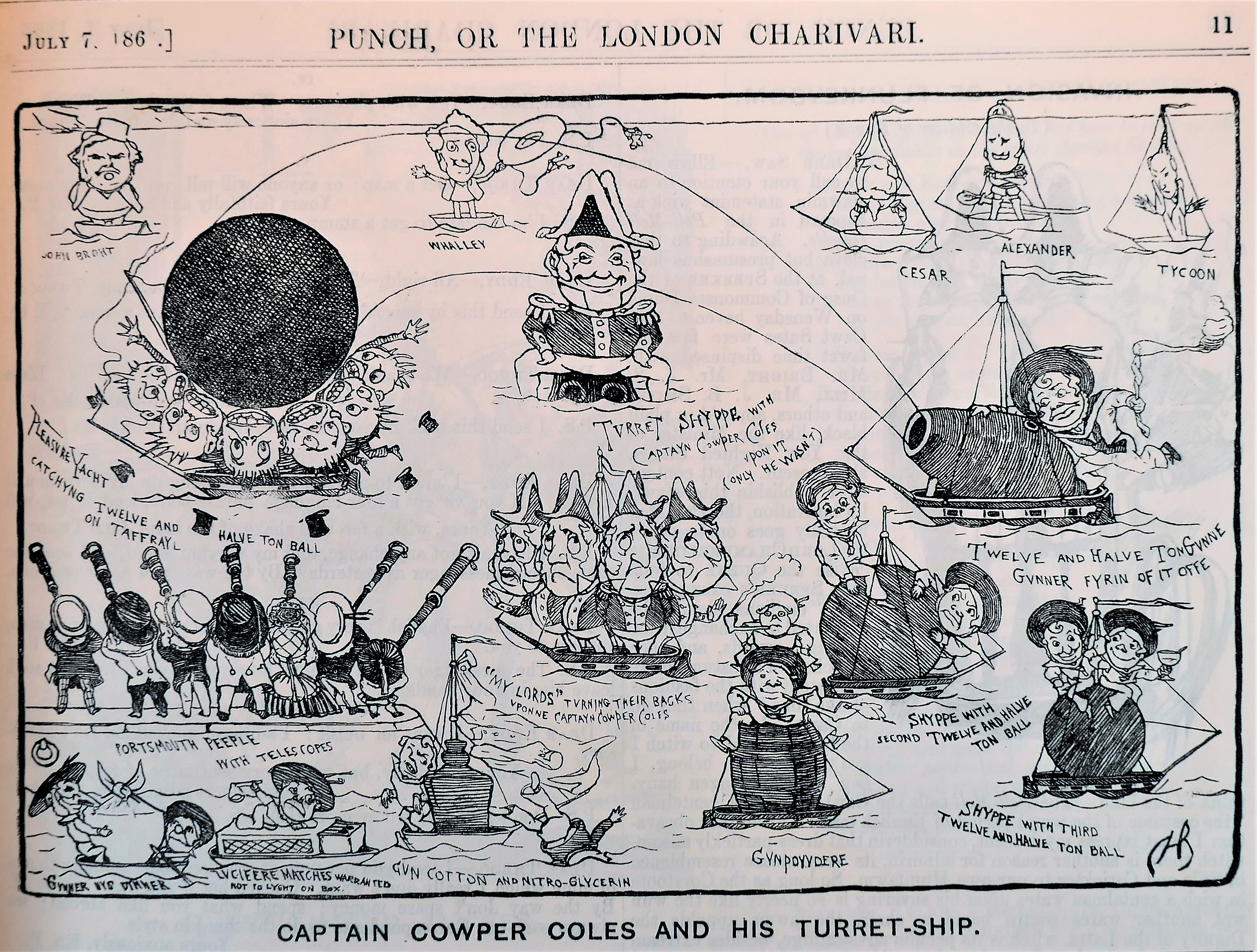
Punch, or the London Charivari - political satire cartoon, dated 7 July 1866. The British press regarded the Admiralty as hidebound and prejudicial to Coles

== Design and construction ==
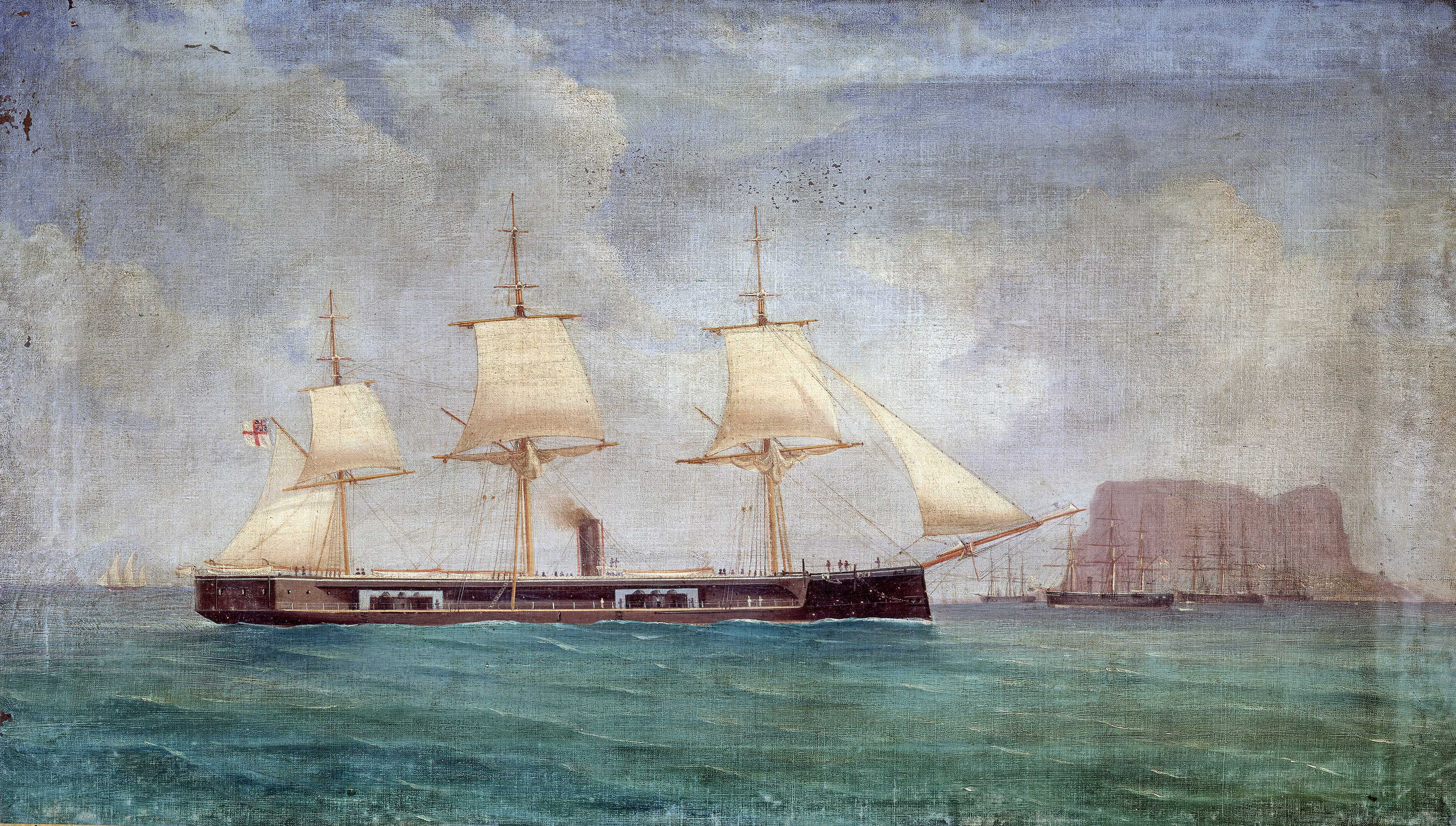
Oil painting of the Captain, c. 1870

On 8 May 1866, Coles informed the Admiralty of his selection of Laird Brothers' Cheshire yard, for the builder of the warship. The Cheshire yard had already built several successful iron warships. In mid-July, Lairds submitted two possible designs for Coles' proposed turret-ship. To prevent the rigging from being damaged when the guns fired through it, it was attached to a platform mounted above the gun turrets known as the hurricane deck instead of brought down to the main deck. Tripod masts were also used to minimise standing rigging.

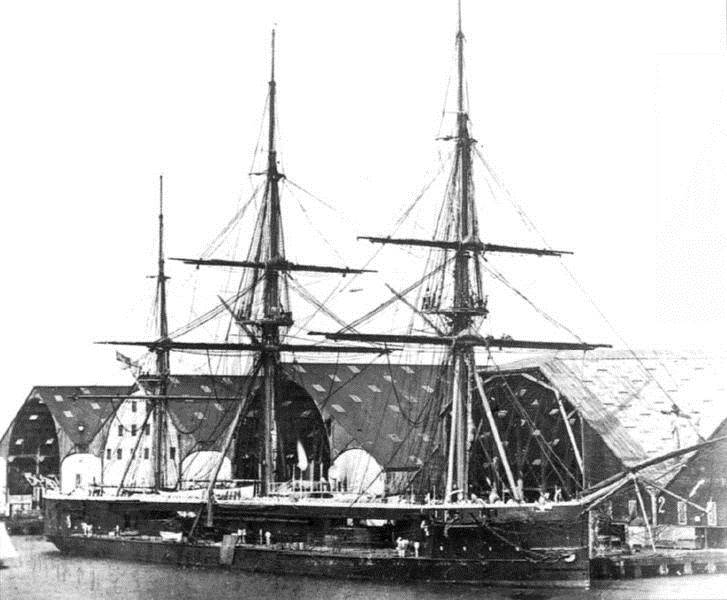
HMS Captain at Chatham 1869

The design called for the ship to have a low freeboard, and Coles' figures estimated it at 8 feet (2.4 m). Both the Controller and the Chief Constructor Edward James Reed raised serious concerns. Robinson noted that the low freeboard could cause flooding issues on the gun deck, and Reed criticised the design in 1866 both for being too heavy and for having too high a centre of gravity. On the latter, Reed noted that it would cause issues "especially as it is proposed to spread a large surface of canvas upon the Captain". As the design neared completion, the First Lord of the Admiralty, Sir John Pakington, wrote on 23 July 1866 to Coles approving the building of the ship, but noting that responsibility for failure would lie on Coles' and the builders' lap.

In November 1866, the contract for HMS Captain was approved, and the design was finished. She was laid down on 30 January 1867 at Laird's yard at Birkenhead, England, launched on 27 March 1869 and completed in March 1870.

Insufficient supervision during the building, owing partly to Coles' protracted illness, meant that she was 735 long tons (747 t) heavier than planned. The designed freeboard was just 8 feet (2.4 m), and the additional weight forced her to float 22 inches (0.56 m) deeper than expected, bringing the freeboard down to just 6 feet 6 inches (1.98 m). This compares with 14 feet (4.3 m) for the two-turret Monarch. The centre of gravity of the vessel also rose by about ten inches during construction. Reed raised havoc over the problems with the freeboard and the centre of gravity, but his objections were over-ruled during the Captain's trials.

She was commissioned on 30 April 1870 under Captain Hugh Talbot Burgoyne, VC. During trials in the following months, the Captain seemed to be everything that Coles had promised and won over many followers. In trials versus the Monarch, she performed well and returned to sea in July and August, travelling to Vigo, Spain, and Gibraltar in separate runs.

== Gunnery trials ==
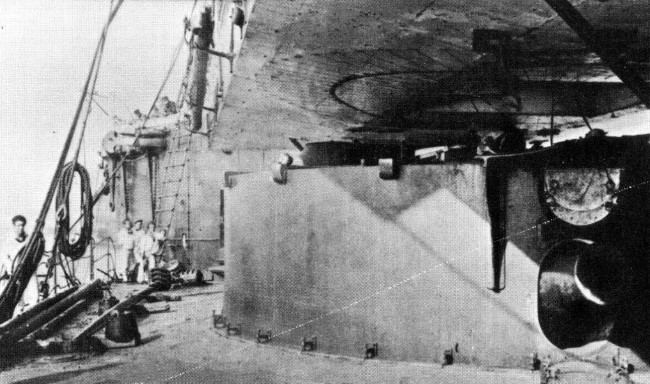
HMS Captain on deck

A trial was undertaken in 1870 to compare the accuracy and rate of fire of turret-mounted heavy guns with those in a centre-battery ship. The target was a 600 feet (180 m) long, 60 feet (18 m) high rock off Vigo. The speed of the ships was 4–5 knots (4.6–5.8 mph; 7.4–9.3 km/h) ("some accounts say stationary"). Each ship fired for five minutes, with the guns starting "loaded and very carefully trained". The guns fired Palliser shells with battering charges at a range of about 1,000 yards (0.91 km). Three out of the Captain's four hits were achieved with the first salvo; firing this salvo caused the ship to roll heavily (±20°); smoke from firing made aiming difficult. Note that the Captain could be expected to capsize if inclined 21°. The Monarch and the Hercules also did better with their first salvo, were inconvenienced by the smoke of firing, and to a lesser extent were caused to roll by firing. On the Hercules the gunsights were on the guns, and this worked better than the turret roof gunsights used by the other ships.

Ship	Weapons firing	Rounds fired	Hits	Rate of fire (rounds per minute)
Hercules	4 × 10-inch MLR	17	10	0.65
Monarch	4 × 12-inch MLR	12	5	0.40
Captain	4 × 12-inch MLR	11	4	0.35

== Sinking ==
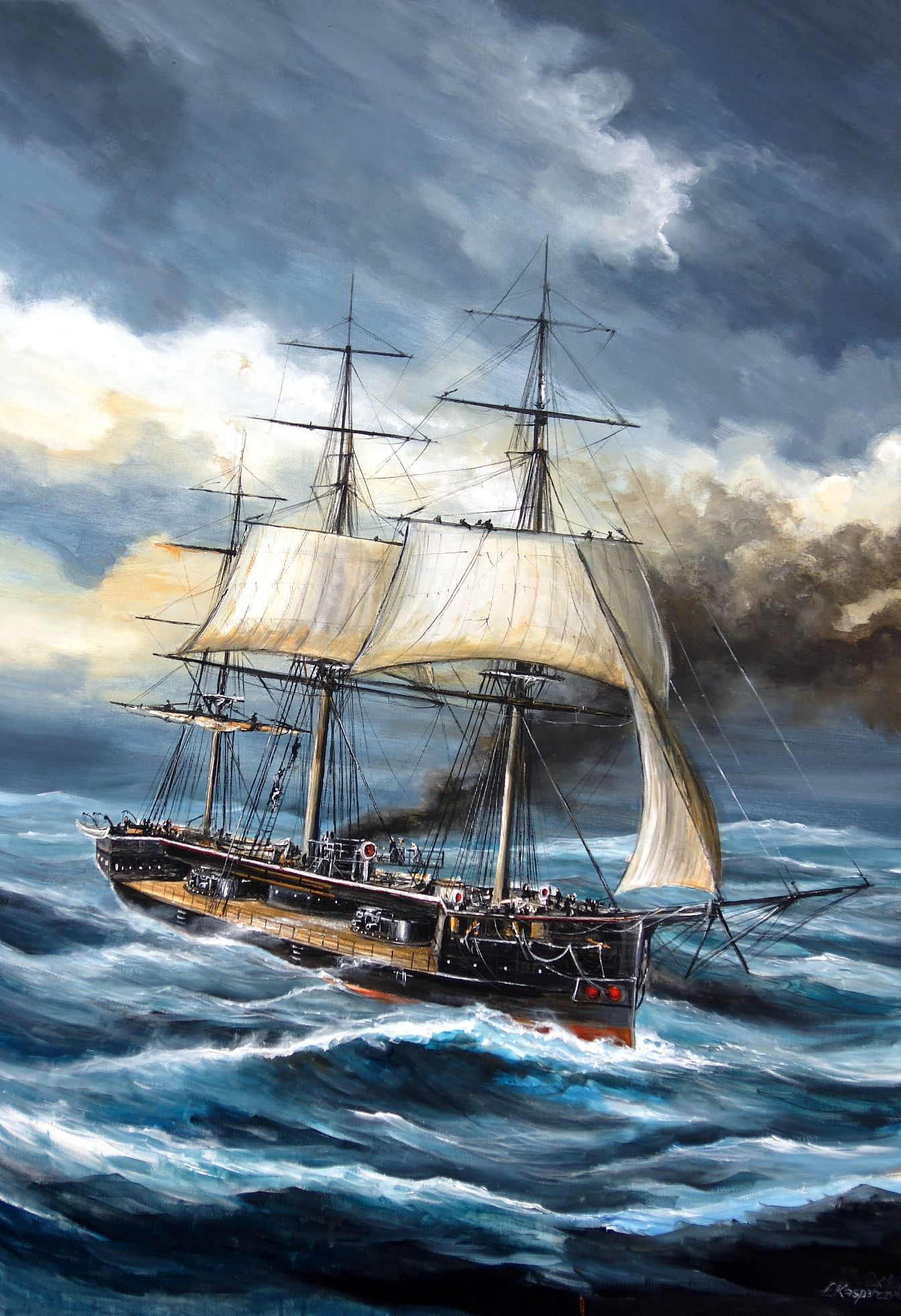
HMS Captain, appearing as she did on 6 September 1870 (painting by Lukasz Kasperczyk)

On the afternoon of 6 September 1870, Captain was cruising with the combined Mediterranean and Channel Squadrons, comprising 11 ships, off Cape Finisterre. The ship made 9.5 knots under sail in a force six wind, which was increasing through the day. The commander in chief, Admiral Sir Alexander Milne, was on board to see her performance, and speed had risen to 11–13 knots before he departed. Not being accustomed to ships with such low freeboard, he was disturbed to note that at this speed with the strengthening sea, waves washed over the weather deck. The weather worsened with rain as the night progressed, and sail was reduced. The wind was blowing from the port bow so that sails had to be angled to the wind, speed was much reduced, and there was considerable force pushing the ship sideways. As the wind rose to a gale, sail was reduced to only the fore staysail and fore and main topsails.

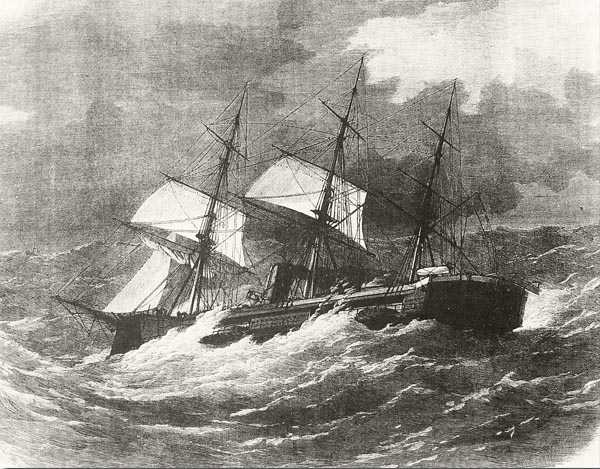
The sinking of the Captain

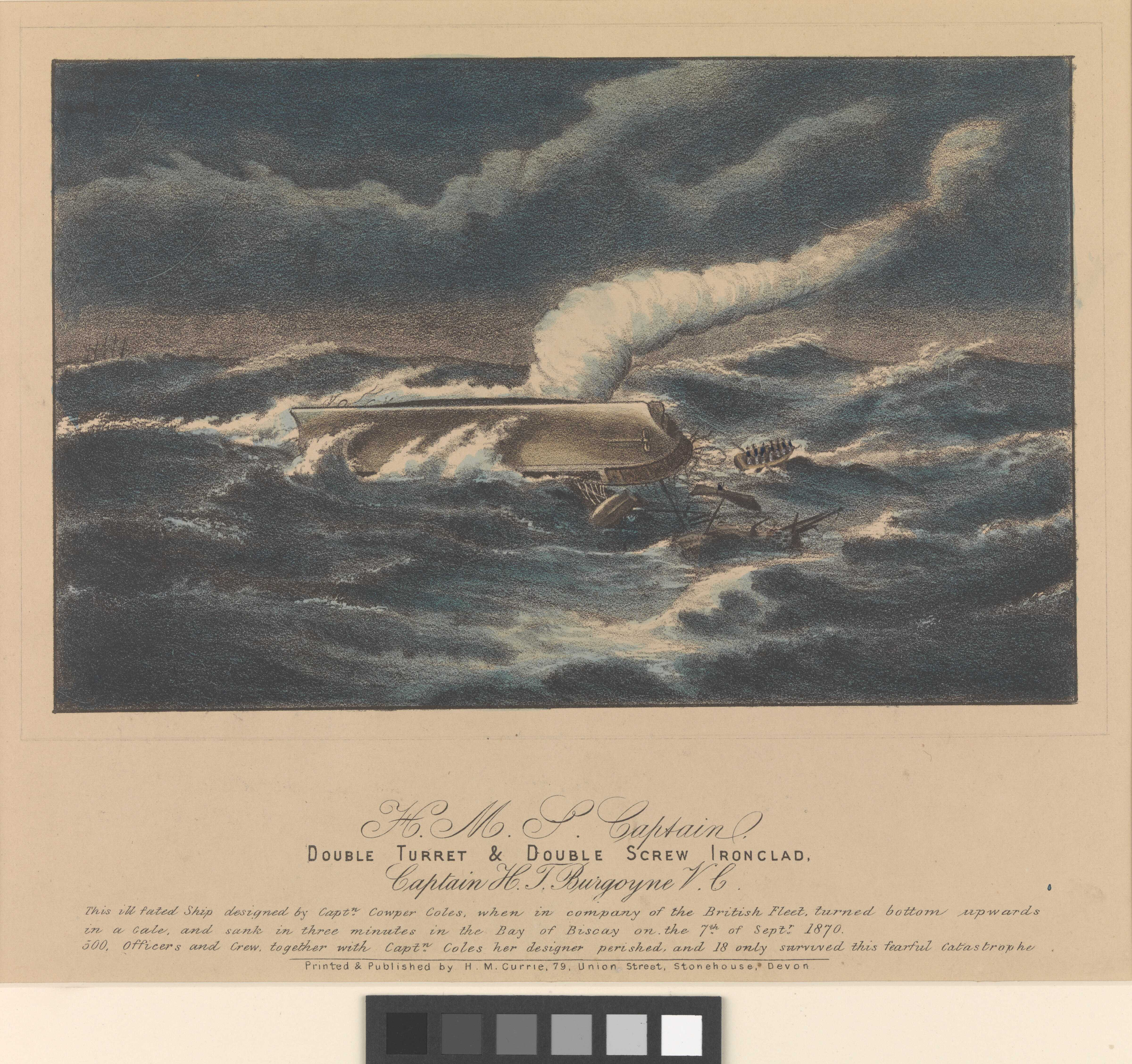
The capsizing of the Captain

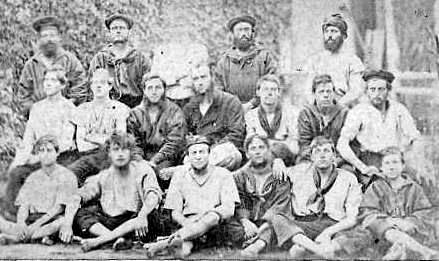
The survivors of the Captain

Shortly after midnight when a new watch came on duty, the ship was heeling over 18 degrees and was felt to lurch to starboard twice. By then other ships in the combined squadron reported winds of Force 9 to 11 (on the Beaufort scale, 60 knots) with 50-foot (15 m) waves. Orders were given to drop the fore topsail and release sheets (ropes) holding both topsails angled into the wind. Before the captain's order could be carried out, the roll increased, and she capsized and sank with the loss of around 472 lives, including Coles'. The First Lord of the Admiralty, Hugh Childers, and Under-Secretary of State for War, Thomas Baring, both lost sons in the disaster. Only 18 of the crew survived, by making it to a boat which had broken free.

== Court-martial ==
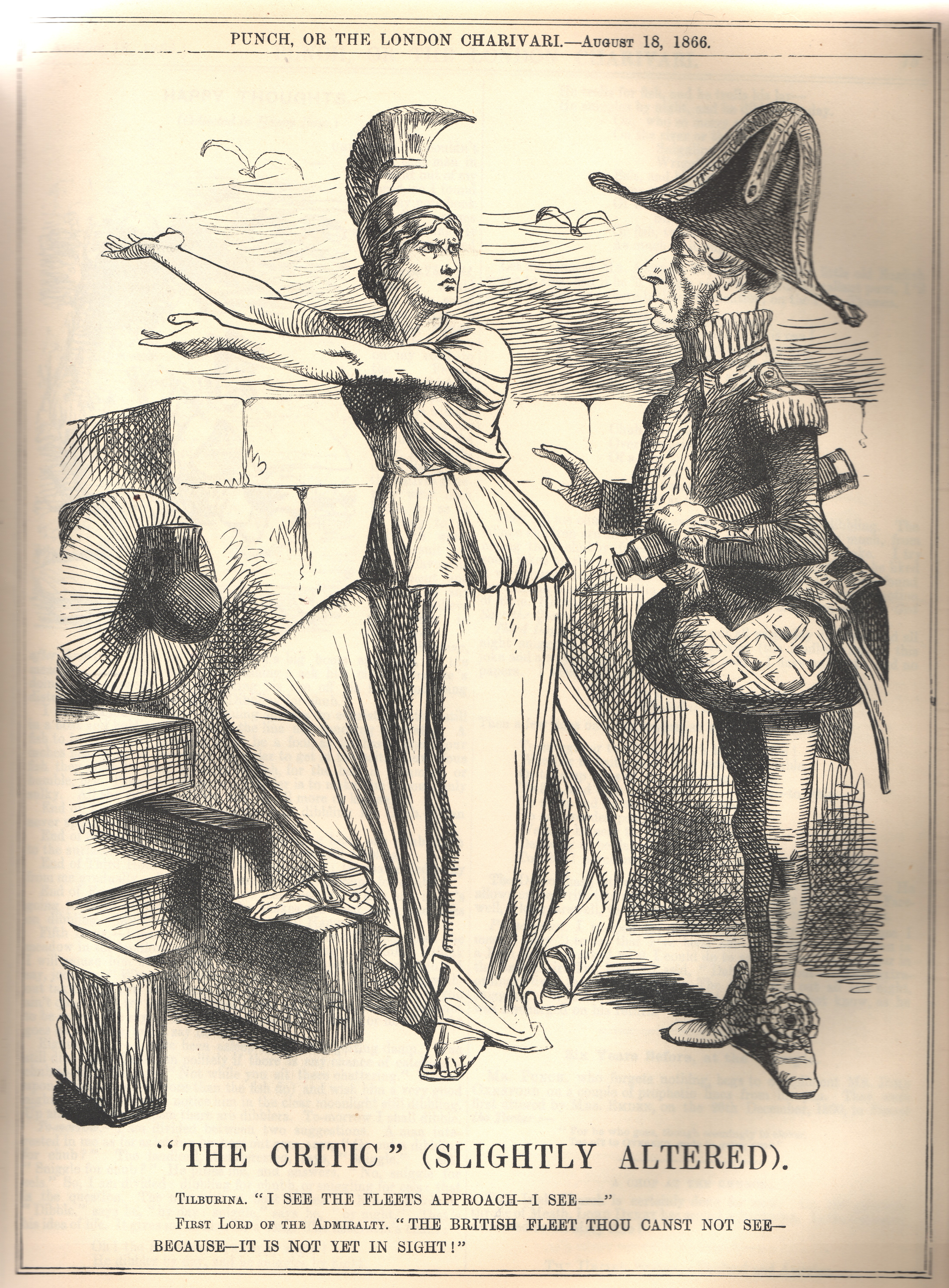
Punch cartoon, 18 August 1866. The goodwill tour of the monitor USS Miantonomoh to Britain caused a stir with the mid-Victorian public, who felt that the Americans had forged ahead with turret-ships while the Admiralty dithered with a 'Fleet of the Future'. Coles responded by insisting that even a large, fully-masted turret-ship should have the same stealth-like qualities and minimal target profile as a monitor.

The subsequent investigation on the loss of Captain, in the form of a court-martial, under Admiral Sir James Hope, took place on board HMS Duke of Wellington, in Portsmouth Harbour. The court-martial expressed the opinion that "the Captain was built in deference to public opinion expressed in Parliament and through other channels, and in opposition to views and opinions of the Controller and his Department". This was a stunning (and unprecedented) rebuke of the mid-Victorian British public. For years they had demanded that Coles be allowed to produce a super-ironclad—armed with turrets—which could restore confidence in the primacy of the Royal Navy in a way which neither broadside ironclads like the partially armoured HMS Warrior nor Reed's central-battery versions seemed able to. Coles fatally added the requirement that a fully-rigged, seagoing turret-ship like HMS Monarch also be as low in the water as possible, like the low-freeboard (though mastless) American monitor USS Miantonomoh; which had crossed the Atlantic under escort in June 1866, and which both Coles and the Board of Admiralty toured when she was anchored at Spithead.

The Admiralty later appointed a committee to consider ship designs past and present. It was somewhat of a departure for the Admiralty to seek scientific advice, but eminent engineers William Thomson (later Lord Kelvin) and William John Macquorn Rankine were appointed to the committee. It concluded that the ship was insufficiently stable: at 14 degrees heel (when the edge of the deck touched the sea) the righting moment due to the buoyancy pushing the ship upright again was just 410-foot-tons (1.2 MN·m). HMS Monarch, the masted turret ship proposed by the 1865 committee and designed by Reed, and which was in the area at the time of the sinking, had a righting moment of 6,500-foot-tons (20 MN·m) at the same angle. Maximum righting moment occurred at a heel of 21 degrees, and thereafter declined to zero at 54.5 degrees. Monarch's righting moment increased to a maximum at 40 degrees. Survivors testified that the Captain floated upside down for between three and ten minutes, which proved that the ship had capsized. An inclining test had been carried out at Portsmouth on 29 July 1870 to allow the ship's stability characteristics to be calculated. Captain set sail on the ship's final voyage before the results of the trial were published.

== Memorials ==
There are memorials to the crew in St Paul's Cathedral, Westminster Abbey, London, and St Anne's church in Portsmouth.

The conclusion of the 1870 Court Martial is engraved on the Memorial to HMS Captain, in the north aisle of St Paul's Cathedral:

Before the Captain was received from her contractors a grave departure from her original design had been committed whereby her draught of water was increased about two feet and her freeboard was diminished to a corresponding extent, and that her stability proved to be dangerously small, combined with an area of sail, under those circumstances, excessive. The Court deeply regret that if these facts were duly known and appreciated, they were not communicated to the officer in command of the ship, or that, if otherwise, the ship was allowed to be employed in the ordinary service of the Fleet before they had been ascertained by calculation and experience.

== Hunt for the wreck of HMS Captain ==
In 2021 Dr. Howard Fuller, a Reader in War Studies at the University of Wolverhampton, initiated a Find the Captain project. This aims to raise funds in an effort to discover the wreck of the Captain, whose sinking was the worst disaster suffered by the Royal Navy in the 'Pax Britannica' era. In company with a Galician-based documentary company, four wrecks were discovered by multibeam echosounder-scan off Cape Finisterre, Spain on 30 August 2022. The fourth wreck has a general configuration and dimensions closely corresponding with HMS Captain's. Fuller and Sir Sherard Cowper-Coles, the great-grandson of Captain Cowper Coles, suggested that the chances of finding the wreck were good and that fund raising had reached the half-way mark by June 2023.

== See also ==
- HMS Serpent, a Royal Navy ship wrecked off the Galician coast in 1890.
