= Cowper Phipps Coles =

English naval captain

Captain Cowper Phipps Coles CB
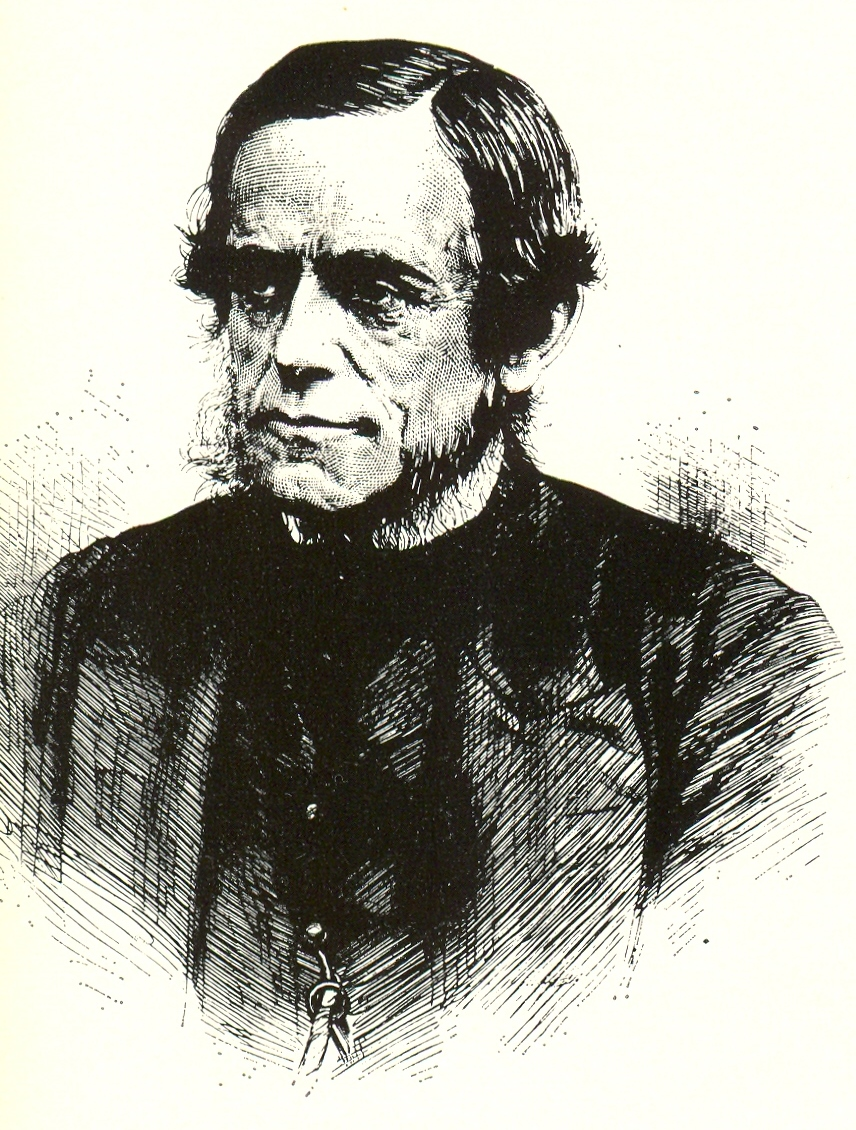
- Coles in an 1870 illustration
- Born: July 9, 1819
- Died: September 7, 1870 (aged 51); Cape Finisterre
- Spouse: Emily Pearson (m. 1856)
- Relatives: Sherard Osborn Cowper-Coles (son); Edmund Lyons, 1st Baron Lyons (uncle)
- Military career
- Allegiance: United Kingdom
- Branch: Royal Navy
- Service years: 1830–1870
- Rank: Captain
- Commands: HMS Stromboli; HMS Royal Sovereign
- Conflicts: Crimean War; Siege of Sevastopol; Siege of Taganrog

Captain Cowper Phipps Coles CB (1819 – 7 September 1870), was an English naval captain with the Royal Navy. Coles was also an inventor; in 1859, he was the first to patent a design for a revolving gun turret. Upon appealing for public support, his turrets were installed on HMS Prince Albert and HMS Royal Sovereign. Coles died in a maritime accident in 1870 when HMS Captain, an experimental warship built to his designs, capsized and sank with him on board.

== Naval career ==
The son of the Reverend John Coles and his wife Mary Ann Goodhew Rogers, Cowper Phipps Coles entered the Royal Navy at the age of eleven. On 9 January 1846, he was promoted to lieutenant and on 5 December 1849 posted to Phaeton commanded by George Augustus Elliot. On 24 October 1853, he was posted to Agamemnon as flag lieutenant for his uncle, Rear Admiral Sir Edmund Lyons. He distinguished himself at the siege of Sevastopol during the Crimean War against the Russian Empire. On 13 November 1854 promoted to commander and on 2 August 1856 was commanding officer of the paddle boat Stromboli in the Black Sea.

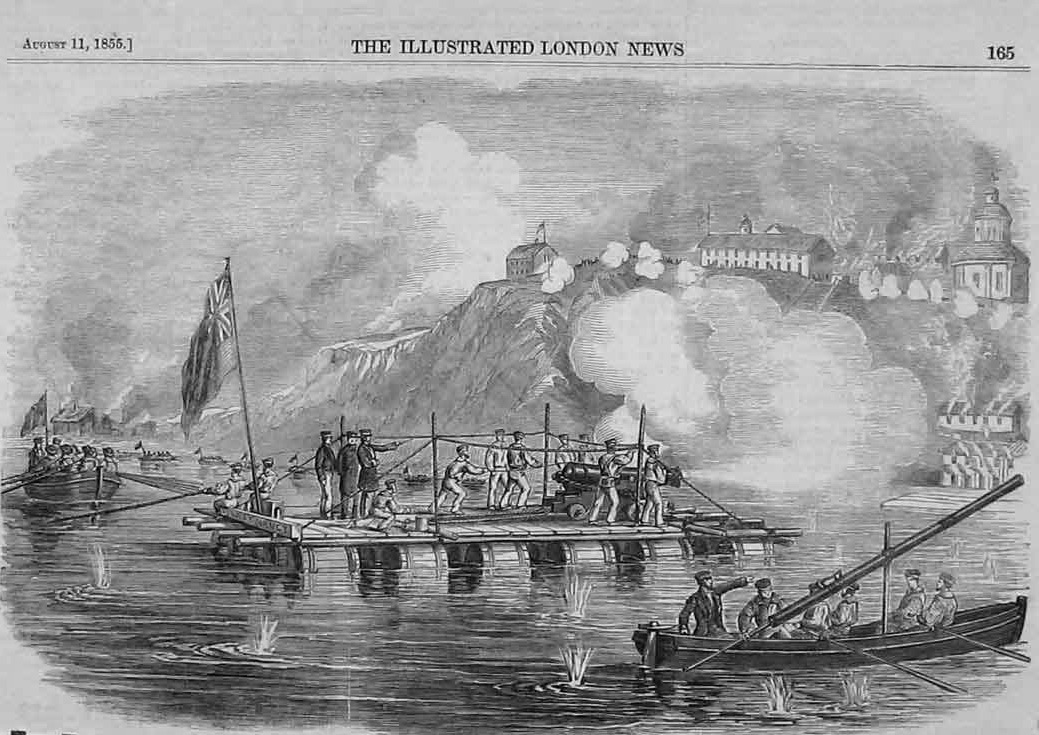
The raft Lady Nancy attacking Taganrog during the third siege attempt in August 1855

It was during the Siege of Taganrog that he and other British naval officers and sailors constructed a 45-foot (14 m) raft named Lady Nancy from twenty-nine casks lashed together with spars. The raft supported a long 32-pounder gun and because of its small draft could be moved into shallow water from where it was used to attack Russian government stores in Taganrog. Coles became a hero for this action, when the press correspondent on board Stromboli reported his daring deeds. Coles expanded the idea by drawing up plans for a better raft, mounting a gun enclosed within a hemispherical shield. Admiral Lyons was impressed with the ideas and Coles was sent to London to present his ideas to the Admiralty. Plans were prepared for 90-by-30-foot (27.4 by 9.1 m) rafts with a draught of 3 feet 7 inches (1.09 m) which would be used to attack the Kronstadt forts. The rafts would be able to approach through shallow waters not protected by the fort guns. Unfortunately for Coles, the war ended before the raft could be built.

=== Turret ship designer ===
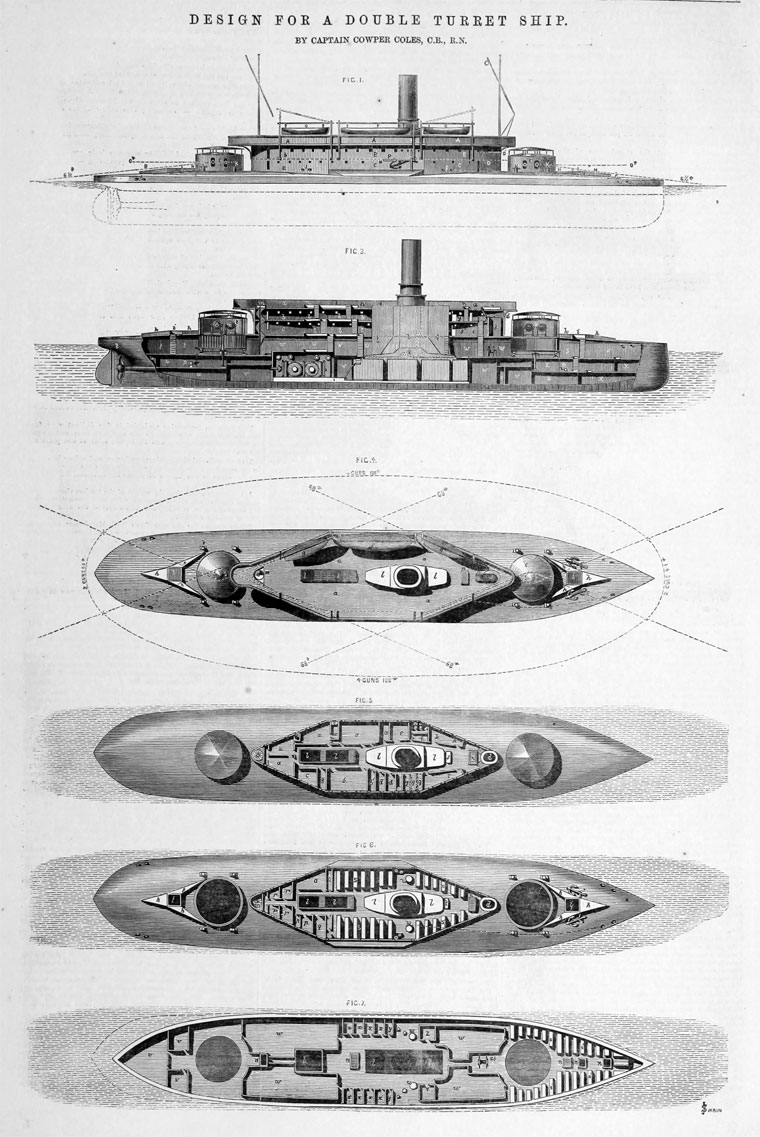
Coles' design for a double turret ship.

On 27 February 1856, Coles was made captain. He was placed on half pay after the war ended and spent his time creating designs for turret ships. Up to this time the principal armament of warships had been batteries of guns firing from fixed ports in the sides of the ship. On 10 March 1859 he filed a patent for a revolving turret, although it is not clear how he came by the idea. The American USS Monitor, constructed by John Ericsson in 1861, incorporated a revolving turret and Ericsson claimed the idea of a revolving protected gun was an old one. The Times suggested that Marc Brunel had given Coles the idea. Coles' design aim was to create a ship with the greatest possible all round arc of fire, as low in the water as possible to minimise the target. This proved to be a weakness in designs he created, because he was unwilling to compromise these aims for the practical necessities of sailing ships' rigging, decks sufficiently high to be clear of heavy seas and other necessary superstructures which restricted the guns' rotation.

The Admiralty accepted the principle of the turret gun as a useful innovation, and incorporated it into other new designs. However, they could not accept his other ideas on ship design. Coles submitted a design for a ship having ten domed turrets each housing two large guns. The design was rejected as impractical, although the Admiralty remained interested in turret ships and instructed its own designers to create better designs. Coles submitted his plans to anyone who might be interested and succeeded in enlisting a number of supporters, including Prince Albert, who wrote to the first Lord of the Admiralty, the Duke of Somerset, supporting the construction of a turret ship. In January 1862, the Admiralty agreed to construct a ship, HMS Prince Albert, which had four turrets and a low freeboard, intended only for coastal defence. Coles was allowed to design the turrets, but the ship was the responsibility of the chief Constructor Isaac Watts.

Coles had another proposal, to take an existing timber ship, remove its upper decks and existing broadside guns and replace them with four turrets on a flat deck. The ship was also to be fitted with 5.5 inches (140 mm) of armour in a belt around the waterline. HMS Royal Sovereign was completed in August 1864, ahead of Prince Albert. Like Prince Albert it had only minimal sails intended to steady the ship rather than drive it along at any speed. The low freeboard was countered by hinged sections increasing the height of the sides above the deck; these were dropped down to allow the guns to fire. Coles later took command of Royal Sovereign for the July 1867 Naval Review.

While these ships were building, Coles made further proposals which the Admiralty resisted pending completion of the trial ships already under construction. However, once Royal Sovereign was completed and had received favourable reports, he requested Admiralty assistance in creating a new design. This was to be based upon the existing HMS Pallas designed by the new Chief Constructor, Edward Reed. The Admiralty provided the original plans of the ship plus Joseph Scullard, constructor at Portsmouth dockyard, to assist. The resulting single turret design was rejected, but the Admiralty instructed Reed to create a larger version with two turrets which became HMS Monarch, laid down in 1866 and completed in June 1869. Coles complained at the inclusion of a forecastle and poop which prevented the guns firing fore and aft, and the high position of the guns 17 feet (5.2 m) above water level, but his objections were dismissed. Reed maintained the features were all intended to improve seaworthiness.

=== HMS Captain ===
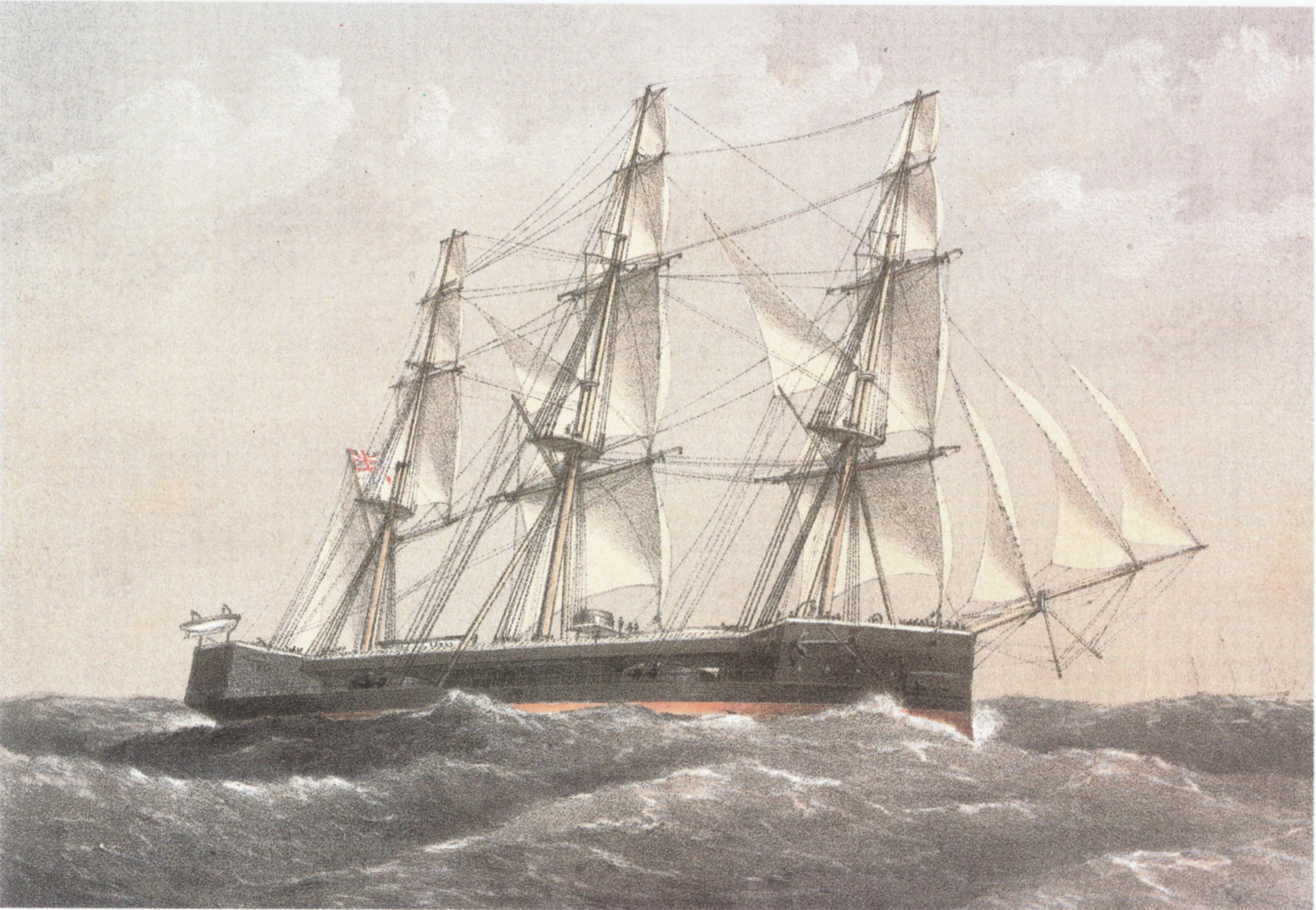
HMS Captain

Coles once again resorted to appealing to public opinion to obtain support for a ship more closely in accord with his design ideas. The civilian First Lord remained agreeable to his plans, although the Board of Admiralty was split. Eventually the Board agreed to pay for the construction of a ship, although this was to be supervised by Coles himself in an Admiralty-approved yard; Laird Brothers agreed to build her. Plans for HMS Captain were submitted to the Admiralty as would be normal, but Reed declined to 'approve' them, instead marking all drawings 'not objected to'. He eventually resigned over the affair in July 1870, two months before the disaster. Construction commenced in January 1867.

Captain was designed to have a freeboard of only 8 feet (2.4 m), but owing to mistakes in construction leading to increased weight, the ship eventually floated 14 inches (360 mm) lower in the water. She had a full set of sails and the highest masts in the navy. She was completed in January 1870, and initial trials were successful. In May, she accompanied the Channel fleet and successfully weathered a gale. Vice-Admiral Sir Thomas Symmonds commanding commented favorably on both Captain and Monarch. Captain achieved 14.25 knots (26.39 km/h; 16.40 mph), compared to Monarch's 14.9 knots (27.6 km/h; 17.1 mph) under steam, but with smaller engines. Under sail, Captain was faster. All in all, she was hailed as a vindication of Coles' ideas.

In August, the ship sailed again with Coles on board. The weather deteriorated, and again she had to face a gale. This time, however, the wind was gusting and unpredictable. Extensive rigging had been necessary to make the ship oceangoing. This forced the creation of a "hurricane deck" above the turrets, which increasingly caught the wind as she heeled over. This may have been instrumental in Captain's tragic capsize. Coles perished in the disaster after midnight on the night of 6 September.

It emerged that the ship had a maximum righting moment at an angle of heel around 18 degrees. If she was pushed over beyond this angle, the moment declined. By contrast, Monarch had a maximum restoring force at an angle of 40 degrees, so that any heel up to this limit would always meet increasing resistance.

== Family ==
In 1856, Coles married Emily Pearson, niece of Admiral Lord Lyons. Coles was himself a nephew, by marriage, of Admiral Lord Lyons, his mother being the sister of Augusta, Lyons' wife. A son was Sherard Osborn Cowper-Coles, metallurgist and inventor of the sherardising process of galvanisation.

== Artist ==
Coles was also an artist. The National Maritime Museum has a number of his watercolors and sells prints of some of them.

== See also ==
- O'Byrne, William Richard (1849). "Coles, Cowper Phipps" . A Naval Biographical Dictionary . John Murray – via Wikisource.
