= Sherard Osborn Cowper-Coles =

Sherard Osborn Cowper-Coles (8 October 1866 – 9 September 1936) was a British metallurgist, and inventor of the sherardising process of galvanization.

== Early life ==
He was born in Ventnor, the fourth son of naval inventor Captain Cowper Phipps Coles. He studied at King's College London and Crystal Palace School of Engineering and became a metallurgist.

== Career ==
He took out a patent on the sherardising process in 1900. Cowper-Coles married his research assistant Constance Hamilton Watts in 1919. The couple continued to work on research together until his death.

They had three sons, the eldest of whom, Sherard, was the father of British diplomat Sherard Cowper-Coles.

== Death ==
He died at home, at Rossall House in Sunbury-on-Thames, of oesophageal cancer, survived by his wife and three sons.
