= Sherardising =

Process of galvanization of ferrous metal surfaces

Sherardising or Zinc thermal diffusion is a process of galvanization of ferrous metal surfaces, also called vapour galvanising and dry galvanizing. The process is named after British metallurgist Sherard Osborn Cowper-Coles (son of naval inventor Cowper Phipps Coles) who invented and patented the method c. 1900. This process involves heating the steel parts up to 350-500 °C in a closed rotating drum that contains metallic zinc dust and possibly an inert filler, such as sand. At temperatures above 300 °C, zinc evaporates and diffuses into the steel substrate forming diffusion bonded Zn-Fe-phases.

Sherardising is ideal for mechanical parts and parts that require coating of inner surfaces, threaded connections, and wear. Part size is limited by drum size. It is reported that pipes up to 12 m in length for the oil industry are sherardised. If the metal surface is free of scale or oxides, no pretreatment is needed. The process is hydrogen-free, acid cleaning in pretreatment is not necessary, furthermore processing temperature remove hydrogen potentials and hydrogen embrittlement is prevented.

== Application ==
During and shortly after World War I, German 5 pfennig and 10 pfennig coins were sherardised.

Sherardizing applications categorised by industry.

Burial of pilings for pole line tension wire utilize sherardising, due to its remarkable ability to stave off contact corrosion in burial.

Residential Natural gas meters use sherardising to remove the threat of sour gas stress cracking in cast materials.

Train rail use railroad hardware that has been sherardised, again due to contact in burial, tension springs and threaded screws.

== Standards ==
- ISO 17668:2016 (replaced BS EN 13811:2003): Sherardizing. Zinc diffusion coatings on ferrous products. Specification
- ISO 14713-3:2017: Zinc coatings. Guidelines and recommendations for the protection against corrosion of iron and steel in structures. Part 3. Sherardizing
- ASTM A1059/1059M:2024 (Standard Specification for Zinc Alloy Thermo-Diffusion Coatings (TDC) on Steel Fasteners, Hardware, and Other Products)

== See also ==
- Hot-dip galvanization
- Corrugated galvanised iron
