= HMS Prince Albert (1864) =

1864 British coastal defence ship

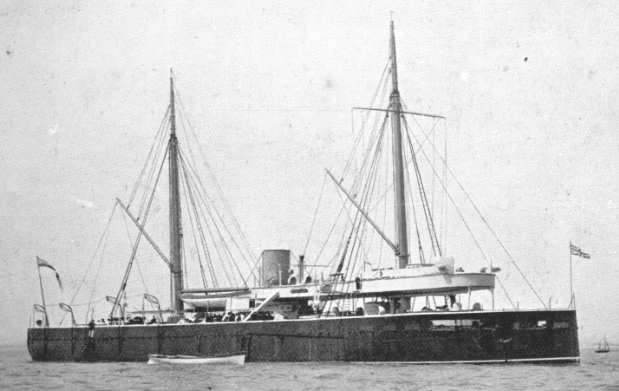
- Prince Albert between 1867 and 1878

History

United Kingdom
- Name: Prince Albert
- Namesake: Prince Albert
- Ordered: 8 April 1862
- Builder: Samuda Brothers, Cubitt Town, London
- Laid down: 29 April 1862
- Launched: 23 May 1864
- Completed: 23 February 1866
- Commissioned: 30 January 1866
- Fate: Sold for scrap, 16 March 1898

General characteristics (as completed)
- Type: Ironclad coast-defence ship
- Displacement: 3,687 long tons (3,746 t)
- Length: 240 ft 7 in (73.33 m) p/p
- Beam: 48 ft 1 in (14.66 m)
- Draught: 20 ft 4 in (6.20 m) (light)
- Installed power: 4 rectangular boilers; 2,130 ihp (1,588 kW)
- Propulsion: 1 shaft; 1 Return connecting-rod, steam engine
- Sail plan: Fore and aft steadying sail only
- Speed: 11.26 knots (20.85 km/h; 12.96 mph)
- Complement: 200 officers and ratings
- Armament: 2 × twin, 2 × single 9 in (229 mm) muzzle-loading rifles
- Armour: Upper hull: 3.375–4.5 in (85.7–114.3 mm); Gun turrets: 5.5–10.5 in (140–270 mm); Deck: 0.75–1.2 in (19–30 mm)

HMS Prince Albert was designed and built as a ironclad, shallow-draught, coast-defence ship, and was the first British warship designed to carry her main armament in turrets. (Note: The first completed turret ship was HMS Royal Sovereign, converted from a ship-of-the-line and completed in 1864.) Completed in 1866, the ship spent the vast majority of her lengthy career as a gunnery training ship. She was briefly mobilized during a war scare in 1878 and participated in two fleet reviews 20 years apart. Prince Albert was relieved of her training duties in 1890, reduced to Dockyard Reserve eight years later, and sold for scrap in 1899.

== Background and description ==
In early 1862, the Controller of the Navy, Rear-Admiral Robert Spencer Robinson, ordered the design of two ironclad, turreted coastal-defence ships, in response to Captain Cowper Coles, a long-time advocate of turret-mounted armament who had attracted the attention of Prince Albert. He submitted a design that was probably worked up by Isaac Watts, the Chief Constructor of the Navy, for a ship with six turrets in March that (displaced) 4,202 long tons (4,269 t) and had a minimum freeboard of seven feet (2.1 m). The Board of Admiralty accepted the design and ordered the ship in April. Changes to the design were common with the number of turrets reduced to two by late May, although the ship was completed with four.

The ship measured 240 feet 7 inches (73.3 m) at the perpendicular and 206 feet 5 inches (62.9 m) at the keel. She had a beam of 48 feet 1 inch (14.7 m), a depth of hold of 19 feet (5.8 m) and a light draught of 20 feet 4 inches (6.20 m). Prince Albert had a tonnage of 2,537 tons burthen and displaced 3,687 long tons (3,746 t). Her crew consisted of 200 officers and ratings She was fitted with a 500-nominal horsepower engine built by Humphrys & Tennant. The two-cylinder, horizontal return connecting rod-steam engine drove a single 17-foot (5.2 m) propeller using steam provided by four rectangular boilers at a working pressure of 24 pounds per square inch (165 kPa; 2 kgf/cm^{2}). They provided enough steam to produce 2,128 indicated horsepower (1,587 kW) which was enough to give her a maximum speed of 11.26 knots (20.85 km/h; 12.96 mph) during her sea trials off Plymouth. Prince Albert was fore-and-aft rigged with two pole masts to steady the ship.

Her armament initially consisted of six 9-inch (229 mm) rifled muzzle loaders, housed in four hand-worked turrets on the centreline. The forward and rearmost turrets each had two guns, while the two middle turrets each had a single gun. It took a crew of 18 men about a minute to rotate the turret one full revolution. A major drawback was that the men rotating the turret could not see the target and had to rely vocal commands to lay the guns. In 1867 the additional guns in the end turrets were removed. The shell of the 14-calibre, 9-inch gun weighed 254 pounds (115.2 kg) while the gun itself weighed 12 long tons (12 t). It had a muzzle velocity of 1,420 ft/s (430 m/s) and was credited with the ability to penetrate a nominal 11.3 inches (287 mm) of wrought iron armour at the muzzle.

Prince Albert's hull was completely protected down to a depth of three feet (0.9 m) below the waterline by 4.5 inches (114 mm) of wrought-iron armour, that reduced to 3.25 inches (83 mm) at the ship's ends, backed by 18 inches (457 mm) of teak. The turret armour was 5.5 inches (140 mm) thick, although the front of the turret was further reinforced by 5 inches (127 mm) of armour. This armour was backed by 14 inches (356 mm) of teak. The armoured deck sloped upwards towards the turrets and consisted of 0.75-inch (19 mm) armour plates over 0.375-inch (10 mm) plates.

== Construction and career ==
Named after Prince Albert, the ship remained the only ship of her name to serve in the Royal Navy through 2020. Prince Albert was ordered on 8 April 1862 from Samuda Brothers and named by Queen Victoria on 16 April. She was launched on 23 May 1864 at their shipyard in Cubitt Town, London, much delayed by design changes and the late delivery of components. Prince Albert was commissioned at Woolwich Dockyard by Captain Arthur Wilmhurst for trials on 30 January 1866. Paid off in June she served as a gunnery training ship at Devonport until 1890, aside from a few short periods of active duty.

A small hurricane deck was added in 1866–1867 above the turrets and a charthouse was installed the following year. The ship participated in the fleet review held at Spithead on 17 July 1867. Prince Albert was mobilized for the Particular Service Squadron formed in August 1878 in response to a war scare with Imperial Russia; she had her boilers replaced sometime in 1878 and six machine guns were installed on the hurricane deck, probably that same year. She was re-commissioned by Commander Charles Inglis for the Jubilee Review in 1887 and took part in naval manoeuvres two years later with the Devonport Reserve. Prince Albert was relegated to Dockyard Reserve in 1898 and sold to Ward, Preston for scrap on 16 March 1899. The ship remained in service at the Queen's request long after she was thoroughly obsolete.
