= HMS Monarch (1868) =

Royal Navy warship

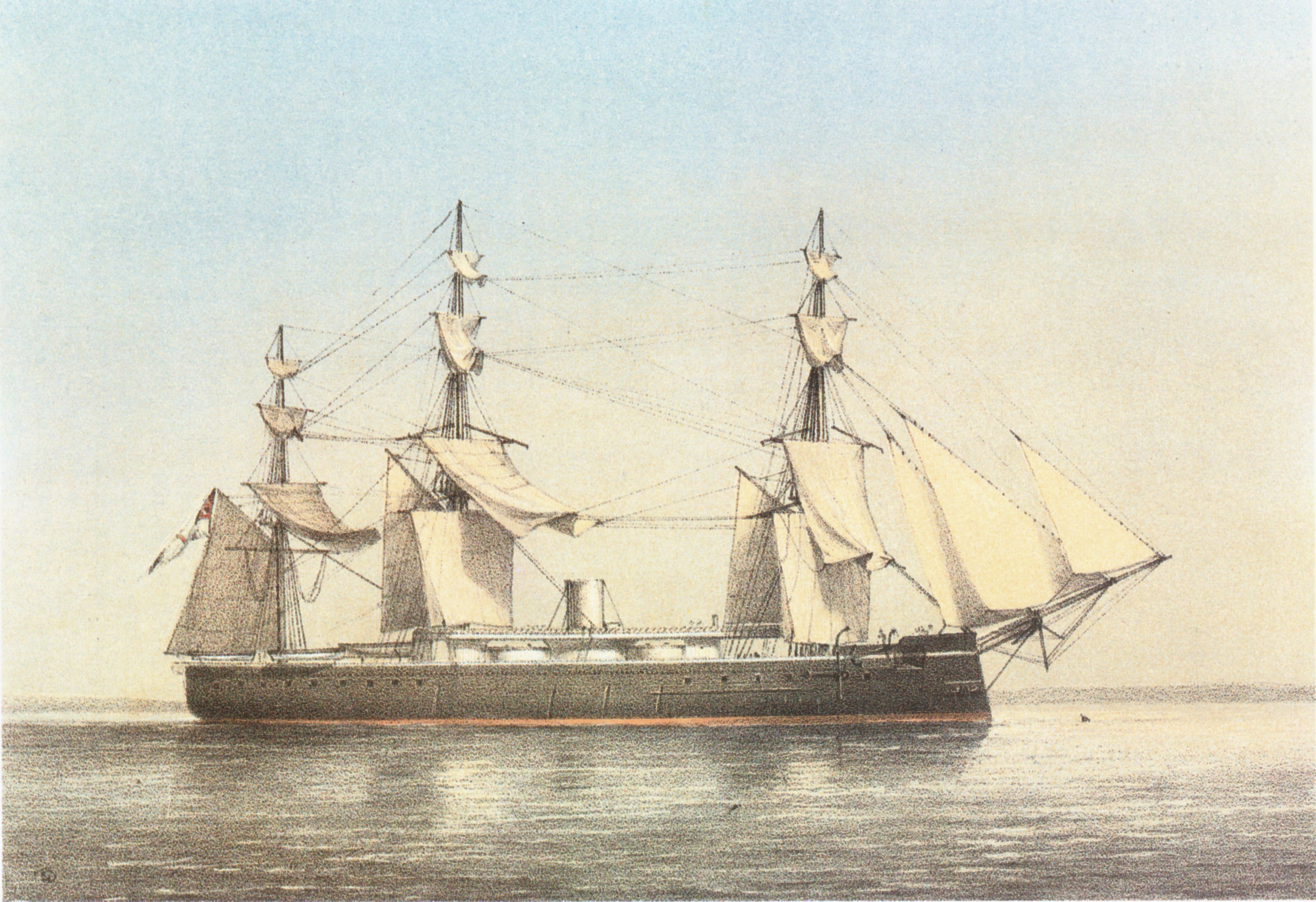
- Painting of HMS Monarch by William Frederick Mitchell

History

United Kingdom
- Name: HMS Monarch
- Builder: Chatham Dockyard
- Laid down: 1 June 1866
- Launched: 25 May 1868
- Completed: 12 June 1869
- Fate: Broken up, 1905

General characteristics
- Displacement: 8,322 long tons (8,456 t)
- Length: 330 ft (100 m)
- Beam: 57 ft 6 in (17.53 m)
- Draught: 22 ft 6 in (6.86 m) light; 26 ft (8 m) deep load
- Propulsion: One-shaft Humphreys & Tennant return connecting rod
- Sail plan: Ship-rigged, sail area 27,700 sq ft (2,600 m^{2})
- Speed: 14.94 knots (17.19 mph; 27.67 km/h) under power; 13 knots (15 mph; 24 km/h) under sail
- Complement: 605
- Armament: 1869 : 4 × 12 in (305 mm) muzzle-loading rifles; 3 × 7 in (178 mm) 6 1/2 ton muzzle-loading rifles; 1871 : 4 × 12 in (305 mm) muzzle-loading rifles; 2 × 9 in (229 mm) muzzle-loading rifles; 1 × 7 in (178 mm) muzzle-loading rifles
- Armour: Belt: 7 in (178 mm) amidships, 4.5 in (114 mm) fore and aft; Turrets: 10 in (254 mm) face, 8 in (203 mm) sides; Bulkheads: 4–4.5 in (102–114 mm); Bow screen: 5 in (127 mm); Conning tower: 8 in (203 mm)

HMS Monarch was the first seagoing British warship to carry her guns in turrets, and the first British warship to carry guns of 12-inch (300 mm) calibre.

== Design ==
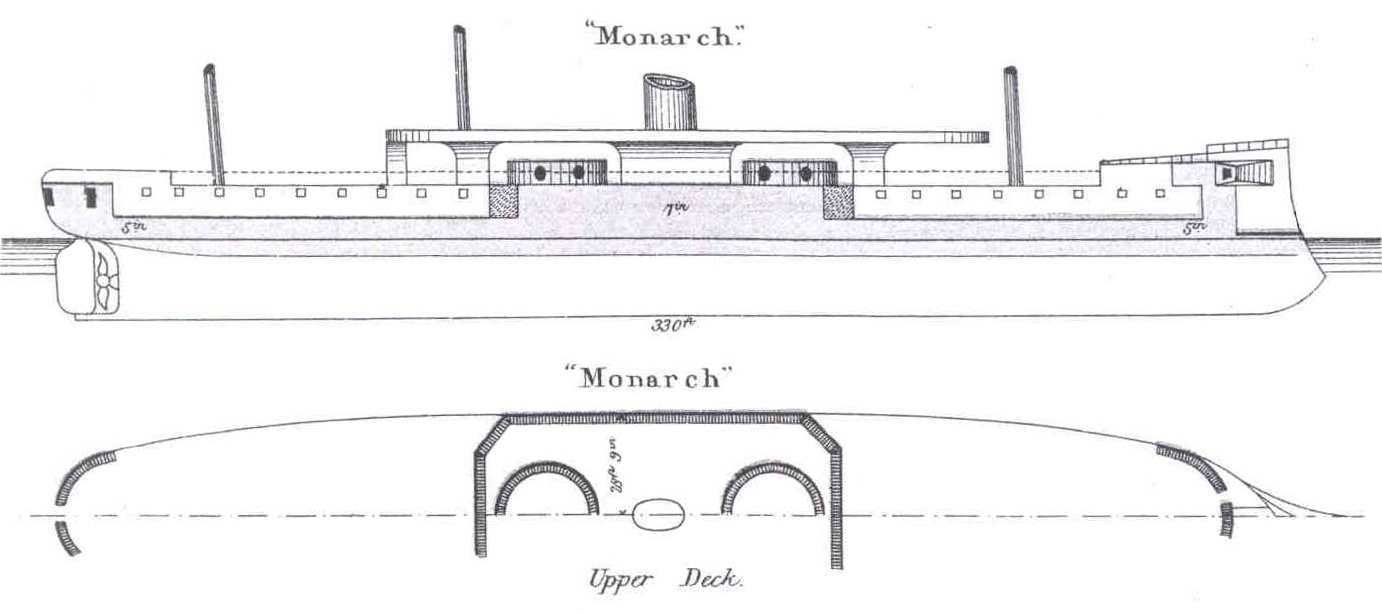
Diagrams showing location of gun turrets and armour protection, as depicted in Brassey's Naval Annual 1888

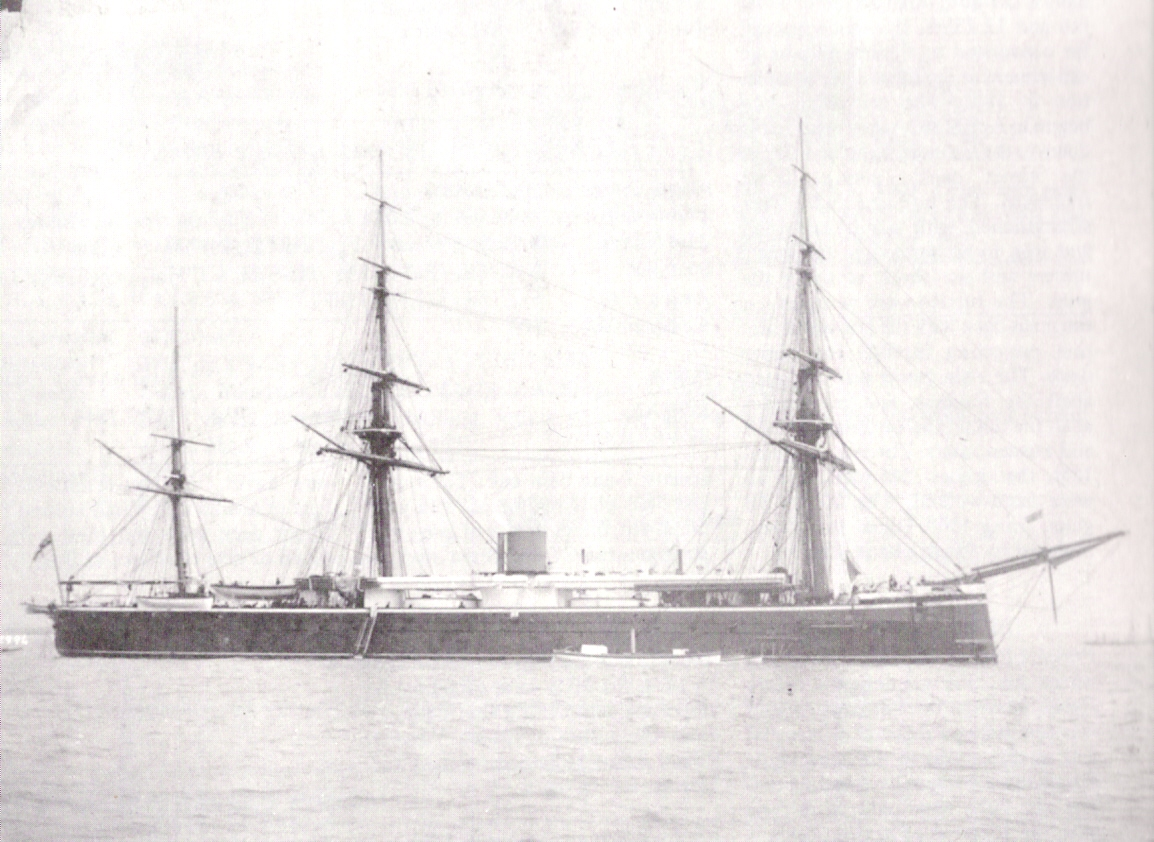
Monarch after her 1872 conversion to barque rig.

She was designed by Sir Edward Reed, at a time when the basic configuration of battleship design was undergoing major change simultaneously in many aspects. Sail was gradually giving way to steam, wooden hulls had just been superseded by iron, smoothbore artillery firing round-shot had been overtaken by rifled shell-firing cannon, increasingly heavier armour was being mounted, and there was mounting agitation in naval design circles to abandon broadside armament in favour of that mounted in turrets. In this melting-pot, any battleship design was fated to be a compromise, and the design of Monarch proved to be so.

Having determined that Monarch would carry her main artillery in turrets, the Board of Admiralty then stipulated that, as she was destined for overseas service, and steam engines were not at that time wholly reliable, she must carry a full ship-rig and be fitted with a forecastle. Reed objected to this concept, which had the effect of totally preventing the main artillery from firing on any other angle than on the port and starboard beams. He was overruled, and is reported to have taken little pride in the resulting ship. He himself wrote, in 1869 "no satisfactorily designed turret ship has yet been built, or even laid down.....the middle of the upper deck of a full-rigged ship is not a very eligible place for fighting large guns". In 1871 Reed stated to the Committee on Designs that he wanted on a turret ship no poop and no forecastle, and masts carrying at most light rig fore or aft on the centre-line which the guns could fire past.

In 1878, she underwent a refit by Messrs. Humphrys, Tennant & Co, Deptford. On 29 April, whilst undergoing sea trials, she ran aground off Sheerness, Kent avoiding a collision with a schooner. She was refloated two hours later.

The hull of Monarch was similar to the hulls of recent broadside ironclads, except that her lines were finer, with a length:beam ratio of 5.7:1; a ratio which was not bettered for a battleship until the building of HMS Dreadnought with a ratio of very nearly 6:1.

== Modernisation ==
In 1890 she was selected for what was at the time called "modernisation". She was given new triple expansion engines and new boilers, and thereafter could make 15.75 knots (29.17 km/h) – less than a knot better than on her first trials. No attempt was made to bring her armament up to date, although the muzzle-loading rifles which she carried were by then totally obsolete, and the fitting of breech-loading cannon would not have been difficult. At this time she received four 12-pounder 76 mm (3.0 in) and ten 3-pounder quick-firers as a torpedo-boat defence.

== Armament ==
The four 12-inch muzzle-loading rifles carried as main armament were housed in two pairs in two centre-line turrets on the upper deck, one on either side of the funnel. These guns, each of which weighed 25 long tons (25 t), could fire a shell weighing 600 pounds (270 kg) with a muzzle velocity of 1,380 ft/s (421 m/s). Being situated on the upper deck, at a height of seventeen feet above water, they were seven feet higher than any battery in the fleet, with significant advantage thereby accruing in terms of range and command. Unlike earlier turret-equipped coast-defence ships, training was by steam power.

To compensate for the inability of the main guns to train either fore or after, two smaller guns of 7 inch calibre were carried in the bow, and one in the stern.

== Service history ==
HMS Monarch in Number 10 Dock, Portsmouth Dockyard, Hampshire; In 1871 census on 2 April; 316 on board; 209 not on board; Capt Charles Murray-Aynsley; (1821-1901) Captain of Monarch, Channel Squadron (until paying off); October 1870 to 29 November 1871

She was commissioned for the Channel Fleet at Chatham, and served therein until 1872. During the service she crossed the Atlantic in the company of USS Plymouth carrying the remains of George Peabody, American merchant, financier and philanthropist, to the United States for burial. On her way home she sailed on one day a distance of 242 nautical miles (448 km), which fell short of the record set by HMS Ocean by one nautical mile only. She paid off for refit, rejoining the Channel Fleet in 1874. On 28 November 1875, Monarch collided with the Norwegian barque Halden 15 nautical miles (28 km) off the Eddystone Rock. Both vessels were severely damaged; they put in to Plymouth. In 1876 she was posted to the Mediterranean, where she served until 1885, with a short refit at home in 1877.

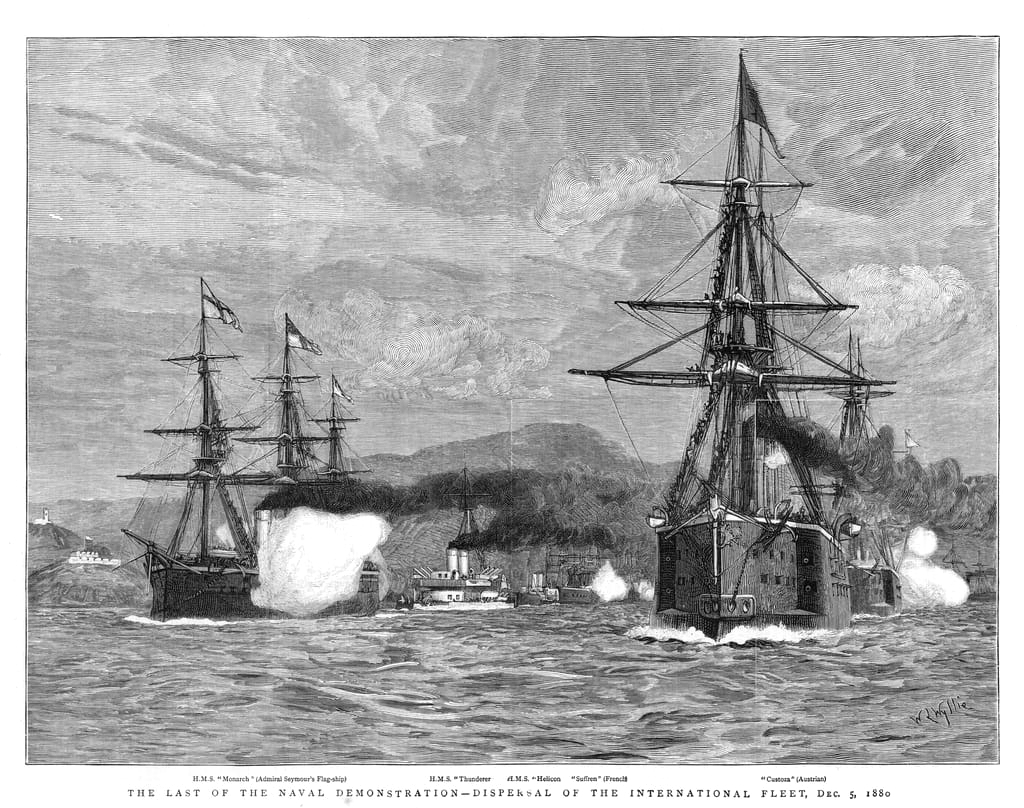
The dispersal of the International Fleet on 5 December 1880 convened for enforcing the Treaty of Berlin. The Graphic 1880

She was present and active at the bombardment of Alexandria in 1882 under command of Captain H Fairfax, firing 125 12-inch (300 mm) shells at the Egyptian forts.

She was ordered to Malta in the Russian war scare of 1885, but broke down en route and her whereabouts were unknown for some days; she was ultimately found, towed into Malta, patched up and sent home under escort. After refit she again served in the Channel between 1885 and 1890. On 24 December 1886, she was run into in the Tagus by HMS Minotaur and was severely damaged. She spent the years from 1890 to 1897 undergoing a lengthy modernisation, after which she was guardship at Simon's Bay until late 1902. Captain Charles Henry Bayly was appointed in command on 1 February 1900.

In March 1902 Captain Robert Kyle McAlpine was appointed in command, for service as Naval Officer in Charge Ascension. Two months later, Captain William Lowther Grant was appointed in command on 5 May 1902, and in that month the ship played host to Jan Smuts and Deneys Reitz, en route to the peace conference at Vereeniging. In July 1902 she was part of a group of seven Royal Navy ships visiting Zanzibar for a show of force following the death of the sultan and accession of his son. By December 1902 she was stationed at Simon's Town, the Royal Navy base outside Cape Town. She was thereafter reduced to the status of a depot ship outside Cape Town, under the new name of HMS Simoom; brought home in 1904, she was sold in 1905.

== Gunnery trials ==
A trial was undertaken in 1870 to compare the accuracy and rate of fire of turret-mounted heavy guns with those in a centre-battery ship. The target was a 600 feet (180 m) long, 60 feet (18 m) high rock off Vigo. The speed of the ships was 4–5 knots (4.6–5.8 mph; 7.4–9.3 km/h) ("some accounts say stationary"). Each ship fired for five minutes, with the guns starting "loaded and very carefully trained". The guns fired Palliser shells with battering charges at a range of about 1,000 yards (0.91 km). Three out of the Captain's four hits were achieved with the first salvo; firing this salvo caused the ship to roll heavily (±20°); smoke from firing made aiming difficult. The Monarch and the Hercules also did better with their first salvo, were inconvenienced by the smoke of firing, and to a lesser extent were caused to roll by firing. On the Hercules the gunsights were on the guns, and this worked better than the turret roof gunsights used by the other ships.

Ship	Weapons firing	Rounds fired	Hits	Rate of fire (rounds per minute)
Hercules	4 × 10-inch MLR	17	10	0.65
Monarch	4 × 12-inch MLR	12	5	0.40
Captain	4 × 12-inch MLR	11	4	0.35

== Publications ==
- Archibald, E.H.H. (1971). The Metal Fighting Ship in the Royal Navy 1860–1970. New York: Arco Publishing Co. ISBN 0-668-02509-3.
- Ballard, G. A. (1980). The Black Battlefleet. Naval Institute Press. ISBN 0-87021-924-3.
- Brown, David K. (1997). Warrior to Dreadnought: Warship Development 1860–1905. Chatham Publishing. ISBN 1-86176-022-1.
- Colledge, J. J.; Warlow, Ben & Bush, Steve (2020). Ships of the Royal Navy: The Complete Record of all Fighting Ships of the Royal Navy from the 15th Century to the Present (5th revised and updated ed.). Seaforth Publishing. ISBN 978-1-5267-9327-0.
- Friedman, Norman (2018). British Battleships of the Victorian Era. Naval Institute Press. ISBN 978-1-68247-329-0.
- Parkes, Oscar (1990) [1966]. British Battleships, Warrior 1860 to Vanguard 1950: A History of Design, Construction, and Armament (New & rev. ed.). Naval Institute Press. ISBN 1-55750-075-4.
- Roberts, John (1979). "Great Britain (including Empire Forces)". In Chesneau, Roger & Kolesnik, Eugene M. (eds.). Conway's All the World's Fighting Ships 1860–1905. Mayflower Books. pp. 1–113. ISBN 0-8317-0302-4.
