= HMS Pallas (1865) =

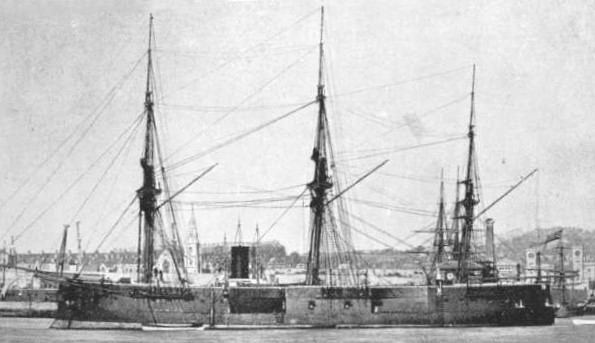

History

United Kingdom
- Name: HMS Pallas
- Namesake: Pallas
- Builder: Woolwich Dockyard
- Laid down: 19 October 1863
- Launched: 14 March 1865
- Completed: 6 March 1866
- Fate: Sold on 20 April 1886

General characteristics
- Displacement: 3,661 tons light, 3,794 tons deep load
- Length: 225 ft (69 m)
- Beam: 50 ft (15 m)
- Draught: 19 ft (5.8 m) light, 24 ft 3 in (7.39 m) deep load
- Propulsion: Humphreys & Tennant compound horizontal I.H.P. = 3,580
- Sail plan: Ship-rigged, sail area 16,716 sq ft (1,553.0 m^{2})
- Speed: 13 knots (24 km/h) under power, 9.5 knots (18 km/h) under sail
- Complement: 253
- Armament: 2 × 7-inch (180 mm) 110-pounder Armstrong breech-loaders; 4 × 7-inch (180 mm) muzzle-loading rifles
- Armour: Belt, battery & bulkheads 4.5 inches (110 mm)

HMS Pallas was a purpose-built wooden-hulled ironclad of the Royal Navy, designed as a private venture by Sir Edward Reed, and accepted by the Board of Admiralty because, as an economy measure, they wished to use up the stocks of seasoned timber held in the Woolwich Dockyard. The fact that Woolwich was not equipped to build iron ships was also relevant.

== Background and design ==
She was built as a centre battery ship, with two of her big guns on either broadside and the others mounted in the extreme bow and stern as chase guns. It was possible to achieve axial fire from the battery guns by traversing them to fire fore or aft through recessed embrasures at the corners of the battery. As with similar arrangements in contemporary box-battery ironclads, moving the guns in anything other than calm water would have been extremely hazardous. The small number of guns, and the low weight of the broadside, was excused on the basis that the ship's primary weapon was the ram.

Pallas was the first warship in the Royal Navy to be fitted with compound expansion engines, and a high performance was expected from them; her specification claimed a speed under power of fourteen knots, which was necessary if she were to ram enemy ships who were themselves under way. On her trials, however, riding light, she achieved only 12.5 knots (23.2 km/h), while piling up an enormous bow wave. After her bow contour was hastily modified she was able to just reach 13 knots (24 km/h), which in the event of armed conflict would have been insufficient to allow her to fulfil her designed ramming function against any enemy ship with an operational power plant.

In spite of this assessment, the fact that the 12.54-knot Austro-Hungarian ironclad SMS Erzherzog Ferdinand Max (1865) was later able to successfully ram an enemy screw-propelled warship which was under way - and indeed sink it - suggests that Pallas' modest speed, while a hindrance to her employment as a ram, would not have entirely prevented an enterprising commander from taking advantage of her fixed underwater weaponry in battle, had a suitable tactical opportunity arisen. As with many tactical aspects of early ironclad warships, the practicability of ramming in a fleet action was poorly understood by naval planners at the time of Pallas' commissioning.

== Service history ==
HMS Pallas was commissioned at Portsmouth. On 31 October 1868, she caught fire at Gibraltar. Seventeen crew were injured. The fire was extinguished with assistance from a United States Navy warship. She served with the Channel Fleet until September 1870, when she was paid off for a long (and very early) refit. She served in the Mediterranean Fleet from 1872 to 1879, and was paid off. She was retained in fourth class reserve at Devonport until sold.
