= HMS Royal Sovereign (1857) =

Ship of the line of the Royal Navy

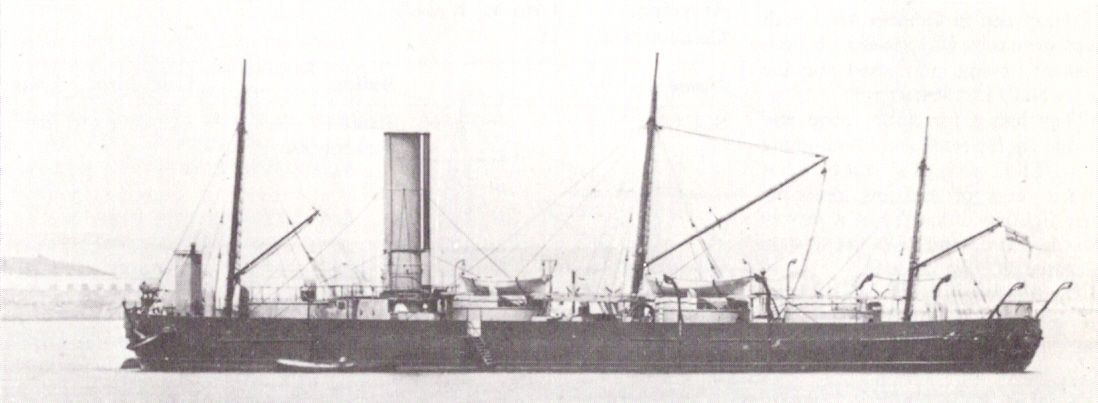
- Royal Sovereign as she appeared as completed as a turret ship in 1864

History

United Kingdom
- Name: Royal Sovereign
- Ordered: 29 June 1848
- Builder: Portsmouth Dockyard
- Laid down: 17 December 1849
- Launched: 25 April 1857
- Fate: Broken up, May 1885
- Notes: Converted to turret ship, 20 August 1864

General characteristics (as a 131-gun ship)
- Class & type: Modified Queen-class ship of the line
- Displacement: 5,080 long tons (5,160 t)
- Length: 240 ft 6 in (73.3 m) (p/p)
- Beam: 62 ft (18.9 m)
- Draught: 25 ft 8 in (7.8 m) (light load)
- Installed power: Boilers; 2,460 ihp (1,830 kW)
- Propulsion: 1 shaft; HRCR steam engine
- Speed: 11 knots (20 km/h; 13 mph)
- Complement: 300 officers and ratings
- Armament: 1 × twin, 3 × single 10.5 in (267 mm) muzzle-loading, smoothbore guns; From 1867 : 1 × twin, 3 × single 9 in (229 mm) rifled muzzle-loaders
- Armour: Waterline belt: 4.5 to 5.5 in (114 to 140 mm); Gun turrets 5.5 to 10 in (140 to 254 mm); Conning tower 5.5 in (140 mm); Deck 1 in (25 mm)

HMS Royal Sovereign was designed as a 121-gun, first-rate modified Queen-class ship of the line, but was converted to screw propulsion whilst still under construction during the 1850s. As part of the conversion, she was lengthened and her armament increased to 131 guns. Completed in 1857, the ship was immediately placed in ordinary. Royal Sovereign was ordered to be cut down into a coastal-defence turret ironclad five years later and the work was completed in 1864. She was only sporadically in commission and spent most of her career as a gunnery training ship or as an experimental ship until she was paid off in 1869. The ship was sold for scrap in 1885.

== Background and description ==
Royal Sovereign was originally ordered on 19 February 1844 as a sister ship of the Surveyor of the Navy, Sir William Symonds's, 110-gun, first rate Queen, but work was suspended on 9 December. After Symonds's resignation in 1847, her design was modified by the Assistant Surveyors John Edye and Isaac Watts into a 120-gun ship and she was reordered to the modified design on 29 June 1848. She was intended to measure 210 feet (64 m) at the gun deck and 171 feet 1 inch (52.1 m) at the keel. The ship would have had a beam of 60 feet (18.3 m), a depth of hold of 24 feet 8 inches (7.5 m) and had a tonnage of 3,185 61/94 tons burthen. Her crew would have numbered 970 officers and ratings. The ship had the usual three-masted full-ship rig.

The ship was intended to be armed with 120 muzzle-loading, smoothbore guns that consisted of thirty 8 in (203 mm), 68 cwt, 68-pounder shell guns (Note: "Cwt" is the abbreviation for hundredweight, 65 cwt referring to the weight of the gun.) on her lower gun deck, thirty 32-pounder (56 cwt) guns on her middle gun deck and thirty 32-pounders (42 cwt) on her upper gun deck. Her forecastle and quarterdeck would have carried a total of six 42 cwt 32-pounders and fourteen short 32-pounder (25 cwt) guns between them. Four 18-pounder carronades would have been positioned on her poop deck.

=== Conversion to screw propulsion ===
The conversion of Royal Sovereign to screw power was authorised by the Admiralty in response to the French first rate, the 130-gun Bretagne, despite the alliance between France and Britain during the ongoing Crimean War. Both the First Lord of the Admiralty, Sir James Graham, and the new Surveyor of the Navy, Captain Baldwin Wake Walker, believed that "France would resume her role as Britain's principal rival at sea". He reordered the ship as a 131-gun steam ship on 23 June 1854. She needed to be cut into two parts to add 23 feet (7 m) amidships to accommodate the engines and boilers and 8 feet (2.4 m) at the stern to improve the flow of water to the screw.

Royal Sovereign's length at the gun deck increased to 240 feet 7 inches (73.3 m) and 201 feet 11 inches (61.5 m) on the keel. She had a beam of 60 feet 1 inch (18.3 m) and a depth of hold of 25 feet 4 inches (7.7 m). The ship had a light draught of 24 feet 5 inches (7.4 m) and a tonnage of 3,765 30/94. Her crew numbered 1,100 officers and ratings. The ship had an 800 nominal horsepower engine built by Maudslay, Sons and Field. The two-cylinder, horizontal, horizontal-return, connecting rod-steam engine drove a single propeller shaft. To reduce drag and improve performance under sail, the ship could hoist her 19-foot-2-inch (5.8 m) propeller into the hull and retract the telescoping funnel. During her sea trials on 12 August 1858 in Stokes Bay, the ship's boilers provided enough steam at 21 psi (145 kPa; 1 kgf/cm^{2}) for the engine to produce 2,796 indicated horsepower (2,085 kW) that was good for a speed of 12.3 knots (22.8 km/h; 14.2 mph).

The ship was armed with 131 guns that consisted of twenty-six 32-pounder (56 cwt) guns and ten 8-inch (65 cwt), 68-pounder shell guns on her lower gun deck, thirty 56-cwt 32-pounder guns and six 8-inch shell guns on her middle gun deck and thirty-eight 32-pounders (42 cwt) on her upper gun deck. Between her forecastle and quarterdeck, she carried twenty 32-pounder gunnades and a single 95 cwt 68-pounder gun that was positioned on the forecastle as a pivot gun so that it could serve as a bow chaser.

=== Conversion into a turret ship ===
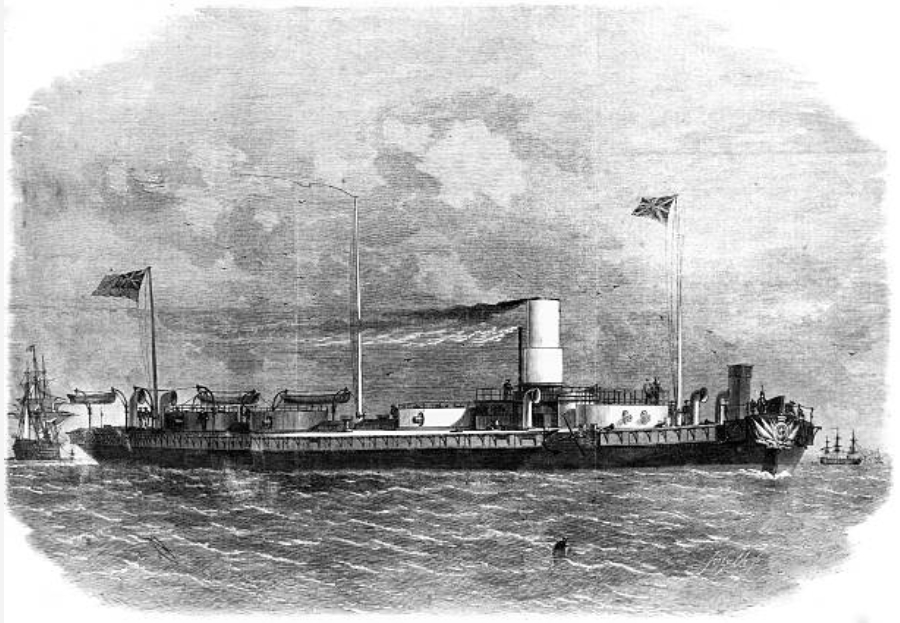
A plate by Lionel Smythe which appeared in the Illustrated London News in 1864 of Royal Sovereign after her conversion into a turret ship that year.

Captain Cowper Coles, the inventor of the revolving gun turret, believed that a mastless ship armed with turret-mounted guns was the best possible design for a coast-defence ship; he proposed that an existing ship of the line be converted into an ironclad fitted with his gun turrets. Royal Sovereign, which had yet to see any active service, was selected by the Admiralty which ordered the conversion in early 1862 after the First Lord of the Admiralty, the Duke of Somerset, agreed to the experiment.

She was cut down to the lower gun deck, leaving her with between 7 and 8 feet (2.1 and 2.4 m) of freeboard. The decks and hull sides were strengthened to carry the planned armament, and to absorb the force when the guns were fired. The foundations of the turrets had to be secured by 120 long tons (120 t) of timber. To improve her seaworthiness, the ship was fitted with thin iron bulwarks that would be lowered in combat. On the completion of her conversion in 1864, she was the first British turret-armed ship, and the only one with a wooden hull. Her length-to-beam ratio was slightly under 4:1, which was the smallest ever ratio used in British armoured ships.

The ship measured 240 feet 6 inches (73.3 m) at the perpendicular and 202 feet (61.6 m) at the keel. She had a beam of 62 feet (18.9 m) and a light draught of 24 feet 8 inches (7.52 m). Royal Sovereign had a tonnage of 3,963 tons burthen and displaced 4,955 long tons (5,035 t). The ship retained her engine, although it only produced 2,463 ihp (1,837 kW) during her sea trials in Stokes Bay on 23 June 1864. This was enough to give her a speed of 11 knots (20 km/h; 13 mph) even though she only had a partial load of her supplies. Royal Sovereign was schooner rigged with three pole masts to steady the ship, the first British capital ship not to be fitted with a square rig. The ship had a quick roll, but was able to operate her armament perfectly well. "She proved to be a good if somewhat uncomfortable sea boat."

==== Armament ====
The original design included five circular, domed turrets, each containing either a 68-pounder or one 100-pounder (45 kg) smoothbore, muzzle-loading cannon that were estimated to weigh a total of 425 long tons (432 t). This was reduced to four turrets while under construction and their shape changed to vertical sides and were partially open topped to reduce weight, increase the space available inside and increase the chance of deflecting enemy shots. The thickness of their armour also increased and the total weight of the hand-worked turrets ballooned to 604 long tons (614 t).

The initial guns carried were 10.5-inch (267 mm) muzzle loaders that fired a steel 168-pound (76.2 kg) shot or a 150-pound (68 kg) spherical one. In 1867 they were all replaced by 9-inch (229 mm) rifled muzzle loaders. The shell of the 14-calibre, 9-inch gun weighed 254 pounds (115.2 kg) while the gun itself weighed 12 long tons (12 t). It had a muzzle velocity of 1,420 ft/s (430 m/s) and was credited with the ability to penetrate a nominal 11.3 inches (287 mm) of wrought iron armour at the muzzle.

==== Protection ====
Royal Sovereign's hull was completely protected down to a depth of three feet (0.9 m) below the waterline by 5.5 inches (140 mm) of wrought-iron armour, that reduced to 4.5 inches (114 mm) at the ship's ends, backed by three feet of timber. The turret armour also 5.5 inches thick, although the front of the turret was further reinforced by 4.5 inches of armour. This armour was backed by 14 inches (356 mm) of teak. The conning tower was located between the forward turret and the funnel and was also protected by 5.5-inch plates. The deck consisted of 1 inch (25 mm) armour plates.

To evaluate how well Coles' turrets held up to gunfire, three shots were fired at 200 yards (183 m) against the aft turret of Royal Sovereign by one of the nine-inch guns carried by HMS Bellerophon on 15 January 1866. While the armour plates of the turret were displaced, and one shot pierced the back of the turret, the ability of the turret to rotate and the guns to fire was not impaired.

== Construction and career ==
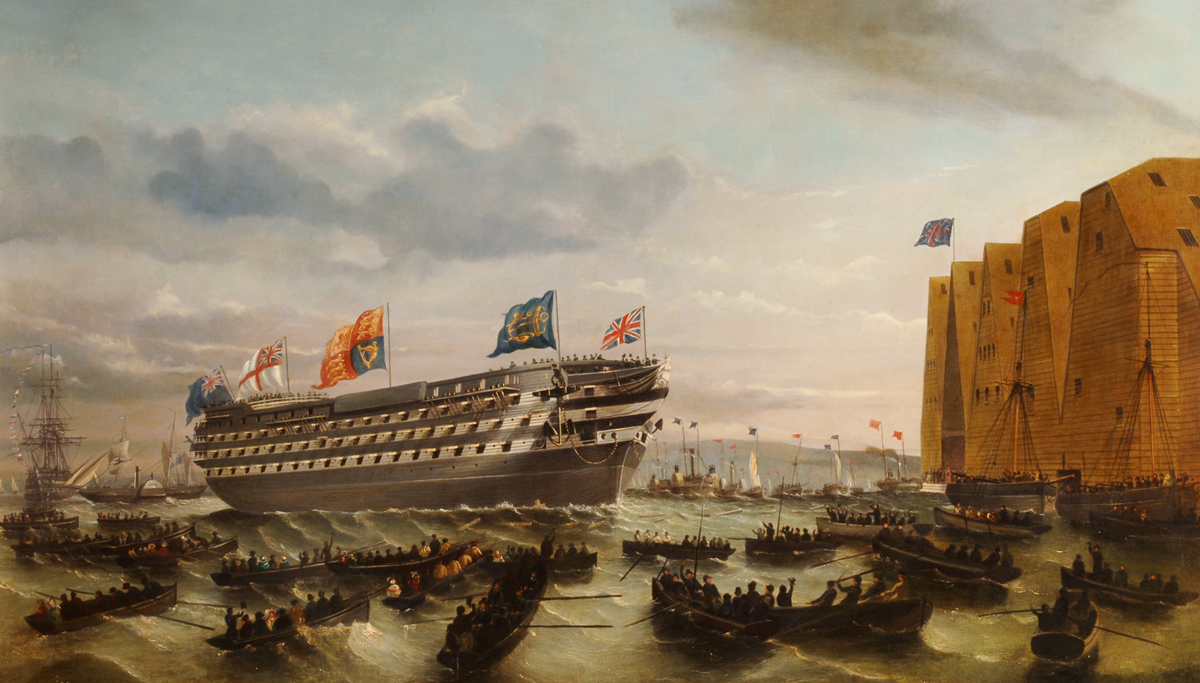
The Launching of the Royal Sovereign at Portsmouth, 25 April 1857, by Edwin Weedon

Royal Sovereign, the fifth ship of her name to serve in the RN, was laid down on 17 December 1849 as a sailing ship at HM Dockyard, Portsmouth. Work began on converting her to screw power on 25 January 1855 and she was launched on 25 April 1857. The ship was completed and placed in ordinary three months later. Royal Sovereign was ordered to be converted into an ironclad turret ship on 4 April 1862. Construction was prolonged by many design changes and she was not completed until 20 August 1864. During her sea trials, her turrets and guns were extensively tested to evaluate the limits of their traversing arcs and the effects of muzzle blast on the deck and the hull compartments. No damage was done to either, even when the guns were fired at three degrees of depression.

She was commissioned by Captain Sherard Osborn on 7 July for service with the Channel Fleet, where she undertook limited operational service. Royal Sovereign was paid off on 15 October and became a tender for HMS Excellent, the navy's gunnery school. Captain Frederick Herbert recommissioned the ship on 1 July 1865 and she was rejoined the Channel Fleet. The ship was present when the French Channel Squadron visited Portsmouth later that month. They issued an invitation to the British to celebrate Emperor Napoleon III's birthday in Cherbourg the following month. The Channel Fleet, including Royal Sovereign, arrived there on 14 August where the officers of both nations exchanged visits aboard each other's ships. The ironclad was inspected by the French Minister of Marine, Prosper de Chasseloup-Laubat, and the prominent naval architect, Henri Dupuy de Lôme. She departed Cherbourg to return to Portsmouth before the British fleet continued onwards to Brest on 21 August. The ship was present when the French fleet returned to Portsmouth on 29 August for more festivities. Royal Sovereign was paid off on 9 October and resumed her role as tender to Excellent. She was recommissioned by Coles in July 1867 to participate in the Naval Review held on 17 July and remained in commission until 3 September 1869. The ship was sold for scrap in May 1885.

== Bibliography ==
- Ballard, G. A. (1980). The Black Battlefleet. Naval Institute Press. ISBN 0-87021-924-3.
- Brown, David K. (1992). "The Era of Uncertainty, 1863 – 1878". In Gardiner, Robert (ed.). Steam, Steel and Shellfire: The Steam Warship 1815–1905. Conway's History of the Ship. Conway Maritime Press. pp. 75–94. ISBN 1-55750-774-0.
- Brown, David K. (1997). Warrior to Dreadnought: Warship Development 1860–1905. Chatham Publishing. ISBN 1-86176-022-1.
- Colledge, J. J.; Warlow, Ben & Bush, Steve (2020). Ships of the Royal Navy: The Complete Record of all Fighting Ships of the Royal Navy from the 15th Century to the Present (5th revised and updated ed.). Seaforth Publishing. ISBN 978-1-5267-9327-0.
- Friedman, Norman (2018). British Battleships of the Victorian Era. Naval Institute Press. ISBN 978-1-68247-329-0.
- Jones, Colin (1996). "Entente Cordiale, 1865". In McLean, David & Preston, Antony (eds.). Warship 1996. Conway Maritime Press. pp. 31–40. ISBN 0-85177-685-X.
- Lambert, Andrew D. (1984). Battleships in Transition: The Creation of the Steam Battlefleet 1815-1860. Conway Maritime Press. ISBN 0-85177-315-X.
- Parkes, Oscar (1990) [1966]. British Battleships, Warrior 1860 to Vanguard 1950: A History of Design, Construction, and Armament (New & rev. ed.). Naval Institute Press. ISBN 1-55750-075-4.
- Roberts, John (1979). "Great Britain (including Empire Forces)". In Chesneau, Roger & Kolesnik, Eugene M. (eds.). Conway's All the World's Fighting Ships 1860–1905. Mayflower Books. pp. 1–113. ISBN 0-8317-0302-4.
- Winfield, Rif (2014). British Warships in the Age of Sail 1817–1863: Design, Construction, Careers and Fates. Seaforth Publishing. ISBN 978-1-84832-169-4.
- Winfield, Rif (2010). First Rate: The Greatest Warships of the Age of Sail. Naval Institute Press. ISBN 978-1-59114-264-5.
