= List of shipwrecks in July 1886 =

The list of shipwrecks in July 1886 includes ships sunk, foundered, grounded, or otherwise lost during July 1886.

== 1 July ==
List of shipwrecks: 1 July 1886
Ship	State	Description
Albert Edward	United Kingdom	The steamship was holed and sank off Southend Pier, Essex. She was later refloated.
John Bladworth	United Kingdom	The steamship collided with th steamship Harton (United Kingdom) and sank in the North Sea 7 nautical miles (13 km) north of Salthouse, Norfolk. John Bladworth was on a voyage from Goole, Yorkshire to Ghent, East Flanders, Belgium.

== 3 July ==
List of shipwrecks: 3 July 1886
Ship	State	Description
Royal Edward	United Kingdom	The full-rigged ship was damaged in a hurricane and her crew abandoned her in the Atlantic Ocean (40°S 27°E) in a sinking condition. Her crew were rescued by the barque Bellona (Norway). Royal Edward was on a voyage from Sharpness, Gloucestershire to Melbourne, Victoria.

== 4 July ==
List of shipwrecks: 4 July 1886
Ship	State	Description
Richard Cory	United Kingdom	The steamship caught fire at Lisbon, Portugal. She was beached and scuttled to extinguish the fire.

== 5 July ==
List of shipwrecks: 5 July 1886
Ship	State	Description
Lincoln	United Kingdom	The steamship struck the Runnelstone, Cornwall in thick fog and sank off St Loy's Cove. Her fourteen crew abandoned ship about 1 nautical mile (1.9 km) off St Loy's Cove and reached Penzance. Lincolnwas on a voyage from Cardiff, Glamorgan to Plymouth, Devon.

== 6 July ==
List of shipwrecks: 6 July 1886
Ship	State	Description
Ralph Ward Jackson	United Kingdom	The ship struck a sunken rock and foundered in the Kattegat. Her crew were rescued. She was on a voyage from West Hartlepool, County Durham to Korsør, Denmark.

== 7 July ==
List of shipwrecks: 7 July 1886
Ship	State	Description
Cornelius	United Kingdom	The Mersey Flat sank in the River Mersey at Liverpool, Lancashire.

== 8 July ==
List of shipwrecks: 8 July 1886
Ship	State	Description
May, and Olivia	(United Kingdom of Great Britain and Ireland) Guernsey; Russia	The tug May and the schooner Olivia were run into by the barque Trowbridge (United Kingdom at South Shields, County Durham and were both severely damaged.
Milwaukee	United States	The steam barge sank in Lake Michigan with the loss of a crew member after colliding in fog with the steam barge C. Hickox (United States).
Walter Ulrich	United Kingdom	The schooner ran aground in the Thames Estuary off Higham, Kent.

== 9 July ==
List of shipwrecks: 9 July 1886
Ship	State	Description
Renown	United Kingdom	The steamship ran aground at Leith, Lothian. She was on a voyage from Oran, Algeria to Leith.
Prince Alfred	United Kingdom	The steam trawler sank off Stonehaven, Aberdeenshire. She was refloated on 16 September and taken in to Stonehaven.

== 14 July ==
List of shipwrecks: 14 July 1886
Ship	State	Description
Blanca	Spanish Navy	The Petronila-class frigate was involved in a serious accident on the Danish coast. Her crew were rescued.

== 16 July ==
List of shipwrecks: 16 July 1886
Ship	State	Description
Napoleon	United States	The fishing boat sank off Norman's Woe.
Prince of Wales	United Kingdom	The steam tug sank after colliding with the ship Peterborough (United Kingdom) off Botany Bay, New South Wales, with loss of two crew. Peterborough was towed into port by the steam tug Kate (United Kingdom).

== 18 July ==
List of shipwrecks: 18 July 1886
Ship	State	Description
HMS Belleisle	Royal Navy	The Belleisle-class ironclad ran aground at Milford Haven, Pembrokeshire. She was refloated.

== 19 July ==
List of shipwrecks: 19 July 1886
Ship	State	Description
Joe Hooker	United States	The schooner was wrecked at Cape Macedome, Newfoundland Colony. Her crew were rescued.

== 20 July ==
List of shipwrecks: 20 July 1886
Ship	State	Description
Eadon	United Kingdom	The Mersey Flat collided with the steamship Alsatian (United Kingdom) and sank in the River Mersey.
Pecheries Françaises No. 13	France	The sloop was driven ashore on the Epi-à-Pin, Seine-Inférieure and capsized.

== 21 July ==
List of shipwrecks: 21 July 1886
Ship	State	Description
Bear	United Kingdom	The barge was run into by the steamship Penguin and sank in the River Thames at Deptford, Kent. The lighterman on board was rescued.

== 22 July ==
List of shipwrecks: 22 July 1886
Ship	State	Description
Elvina	United Kingdom	The ketch foundered off Linney Head, Pembrokeshire with the loss of all on board. She was on a voyage from Cardiff, Glamorgan to Dunmore Head, County Kerry.

== 30 July ==
List of shipwrecks: 30 July 1886
Ship	State	Description
Clarissa	United Kingdom	The schooner foundered in Cardigan Bay. Her crew were rescued by the steamship Mersey (United Kingdom).
Mersey	United Kingdom	The steamship ran ashore in Cardigan Bay and was abandoned.
Unnamed	United States	The yacht capsized off Sandy Hook, New Jersey with the loss of seven of the sixteen people on board.

== 31 July ==
List of shipwrecks: 31 July 1886
Ship	State	Description
Bloomer	United States	The schooner sank 15 nautical miles (28 km) off Kennebunk, Maine. Her crew were rescued.
Passport	Canada	The steamship struck a dock at the east entrance to the Cornwall Canal and sank.

== Unknown date ==
List of shipwrecks: Unknown date in July 1886
Ship	State	Description
Anna	Netherlands	The galiot ran aground. She was on a voyage from Groningen to Hull, Yorkshire, United Kingdom. She was refloated and put back to Delfzijl, Groningen in a leaky condition.
Arethusa	Germany	The barque collided with another vessel and was severely damaged. She was on a voyage from Memel to London, United Kingdom. She put in to Helsingør, Denmark.
Athena	United Kingdom	The ship was driven ashore in the Orkney Islands. She subsequently broke up.
Diligentia	United Kingdom	The ship was abandoned in the Atlantic Ocean before 9 July. Her crew were rescued by the barque India (Norway). Diligentia was on a voyage from Belfast, County Antrim to Matane, Quebec, Canada.
Fortuna	United Kingdom	The brig ran aground at Dundrum, County Down. She was on a voyage from Miramichi, New Brunswick, Canada to Dundrum.
Gate City	United States	The steamship was driven ashore in Tarpaulin Cove. She was later refloated.
Havre	France	The steamship put in to Aden, Aden Governorate on fire. She was on a voyage from Hamburg, Germany to the East Indies and China.
Indra	India	The steamship sank in the Hooghly River upstream of Calcutta.
James J. Dowsett, and Moi Wahine	Flags unknown	The steamship James J. Dowsett collided with the schooner Moi Wahine and sank in the Pacific Ocean. Moi Wahine was severely damaged. She put in to Honolulu, Kingdom of Hawaii.
Kapiolani	Flag unknown	The steamship sank off the mouth of the Pearl River.
Leader	United Kingdom	The ship was lost on a voyage from Warrenpoint, County Antrim to Greenock, Renfrewshire.
Magellan	United Kingdom	The steamship was driven ashore at Cape Virgin, Argentina. She was on a voyage from Liverpool, Lancashire to Valparaíso, Chile. She was refloated and taken in to Sandy Point, Chile in a leaky condition.
Maiden	United Kingdom	The pilot cutter was run down and sunk by the steamship Carl Rathkens (United Kingdom). Her crew were rescued.
Medway	United Kingdom	The steamship ran aground on the Swash, in the Bristol Channel off the coast of Somerset. .
Mercutio	United Kingdom	The steamship was driven ashore at "Stubben", Denmark. She was on a voyage from Stettin, Germany to Rotterdam, South Holland, Netherlands. She was later refloated and resumed her voyage.
Minnie Carmichael	United Kingdom	The barque was wrecked at Valparaíso. Her crew were rescued. She was on a voyage from Pisagua, Chile to the Hampton Roads, Virginia, United States.
Nicosian	United Kingdom	The steamship was driven ashore near Hanko, Grand Duchy of Finland.
Prinz Albrecht	Germany	The steamship was driven ashore 6 nautical miles (11 km) east of Tangier, Morocco.
Sandnaes	United Kingdom	The brigantine was wrecked on Beaver Island, Nova Scotia, Canada. Her crew was rescued.
Sophia Joakim	United Kingdom	The barque sank at Penang, Straits Settlements. She was on a voyage from Calcutta to Muscat, Oman.
RMS Tagus	United Kingdom	The steamship was driven ashore at "Barra Falsa", Brazil. She was later refloated.
Vega	Norway	The barque was driven ashore on Terschelling, Friesland, Netherlands.
