= Samudio =

Samudio may refer to:

- Álvaro Cepeda Samudio (1926–1972), Colombian journalist, novelist, short story writer, and filmmaker
- Braian Samudio (born 1995), Paraguayan football player
- Bruninho Samudio (born 2010), Brazilian professional goalkeeper
- Domingo "Sam" Samudio or "Sam the Sham" (born 1937), stage name of American rock and roll singer Domingo "Sam" Zamudio
- Eliza Samudio (1985–2010), Brazilian model
- Juan Samudio (born 1978), Paraguayan footballer
- Miguel Samudio (born 1986), Paraguayan footballer
- Nicholas Samudio, man with Down syndrome accused by police of being a hitman for the Latin Kings
- Patrocinio Samudio (1975–2017), Paraguayan footballer

== See also ==
- Samuda
- Zamudio
- Zamudio SD
