= Samuda =

Samuda may refer to:

- Isaac de Sequeira Samuda (died 1743), British physician
- Jacob Samuda (1811–1844), Jewish English civil engineer born in London
- Jacqueline Samuda, Canadian actress, director and writer
- Joseph d'Aguilar Samuda (1813–1885), English civil engineer and politician
- Karl Samuda, Jamaican politician
- Matthew Samuda, Jamaican politician

== See also ==
- Samuda Brothers, engineering and ship building firm at Cubitt Town on the Isle of Dogs in London, founded by Jacob and Joseph d'Aguilar Samuda
- Samuda Estate, on the east side of Manchester Road, in Cubitt Town on the Isle of Dogs
