= London Yard =

Coordinates: 51.49468°N 0.00687°W

London Yard was a shipyard in Cubitt Town, London, in use between around 1856 and 1908 by various shipbuilding companies, including Westwood, Baillie and Yarrow Shipbuilders.

== Location ==
The site is on the north bank of the Thames immediately to the south of the Samuda Estate in Cubitt Town on the Isle of Dogs, and lies between the river and Manchester Road. It occupies around 8 acres (3.2 ha), with around 180 feet (55 m) of river frontage.

== History ==
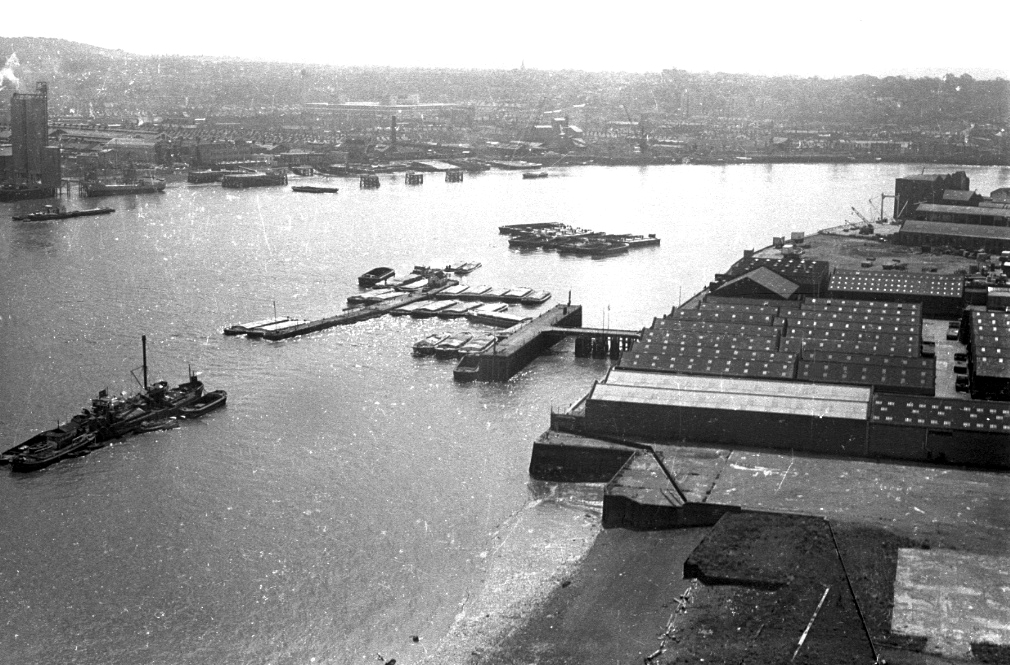
Derelict London Yard (foreground) in 1974.

The site, immediately upstream of the yard of Samuda Brothers, was acquired in 1856 by Robert Baillie and Joseph Westwood. Westwood and Baillie built a number of ships at the yard including HMS Resistance, but subsequently concentrated mainly on the manufacture of iron and steel bridges. Westwood and Ballie went out of business in 1893.

The yard was taken over in 1898 by Yarrows, who had outgrown their original yard to the north at Folly Wall. Yarrows built many torpedo boat destroyers at the yard. As shipbuilding in London declined, Yarrows subsequently transferred to Scotstoun, Glasgow between 1906 and 1908.

In 1917 the freehold was purchased by C. & E. Morton, a local manufacturer of soups, pickles and jams. The site was used for the manufacture of packing cases and for storage. Mortons employed around 600 people here.

Mortons sold the site in 1936. It is said to have been used during World War II for the construction of units for the Mulberry harbours used in the invasion of Normandy. After the war it was acquired by Badcocks of Greenwich, which had previously occupied part of the site as a tenant. By the early 1960s Badcocks had been joined by a variety of other firms, all of which made use of existing buildings.

By 1972 the wharf was unoccupied. In 1977 it was acquired by the GLC. A plan to build housing, a water-sports centre and a boat-building yard stalled when heavy pollution was discovered. It passed to the London Docklands Development Corporation, and was sold to a private developer, becoming one of the first sites on the Isle of Dogs to be redeveloped.

It is now occupied by 312 residential units, completed in 1988. Development included opening up a stretch of the foreshore as a beach (owned by the Port of London Authority), and the opening of a section of riverside walkway (owned by the local authority).
