= Belleisle-class ironclad =

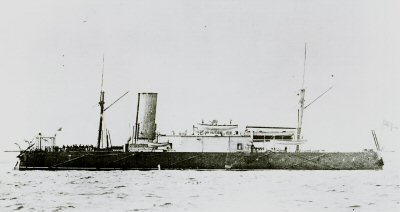
- HMS Belleisle

Class overview
- Name: Belleisle class
- Builders: Samuda Brothers, Poplar, London
- Operators: Royal Navy
- Built: 1874–1882
- In service: 1878–1913
- Completed: 2

General characteristics
- Type: Ironclad
- Displacement: 4,870 tons
- Length: 245 ft (75 m) p/p
- Beam: 52 ft (16 m)
- Draught: 21 ft (6.4 m)
- Propulsion: Two-shaft Maudslay horizontal; 4,040 ihp (3,010 kW)
- Sail plan: Square rig on foremast, gaff on mizzen
- Speed: 12.1 knots (22.4 km/h; 13.9 mph)
- Complement: 249
- Armament: 4 × 12 in (300 mm) muzzle-loading rifles; 4 × 20-pounder breech-loaders; 2 × torpedo carriages
- Armour: Belt: 6–12 in (150–300 mm); Battery: 8–10 in (200–250 mm); Bulkheads: 5–9 in (130–230 mm); Conning tower: 9 in (230 mm); Decks: 1–3 in (25–76 mm)

The two ships of the Belleisle class, HMS Belleisle and HMS Orion, originally built in Britain for the Ottoman Navy, were taken over by the Royal Navy in 1878.

== History ==
In 1878 Russia and the Ottoman Empire were at war, and it was perceived by the British Government that Britain might be drawn into the conflict. This perception has become known to posterity as "the Russian war scare of 1878". In order to enhance the forces available to the Royal Navy, four ships were quickly purchased for a total cost of £2 million; Belleisle, Orion and HMS Superb from Turkey and HMS Neptune from Brazil.

It would have been necessary in any case to detain the Turkish ships in British ports for the duration of hostilities to observe neutrality agreements, and in this situation compensation by purchase was essentially obligatory.

The ships were designed by a Turkish naval architect, Ahmed Pasha, as small ironclad rams of limited size and endurance for use in the eastern Mediterranean. They required considerable dockyard work after purchase to bring them up to anything near British standards in armament and equipment, but were never comparable in military value to other contemporary Royal Naval battleships. They were poorly armed and of low speed, and their meagre coal supply prevented their being used on blockade work or at any distance from a home port. They were, however, of shallow draught, allowing them to work close inshore, and after being labelled as "armoured rams" and "second-class battleships" they ultimately received the appellation "coast-defence ship".
