= HMS Superb (1875) =

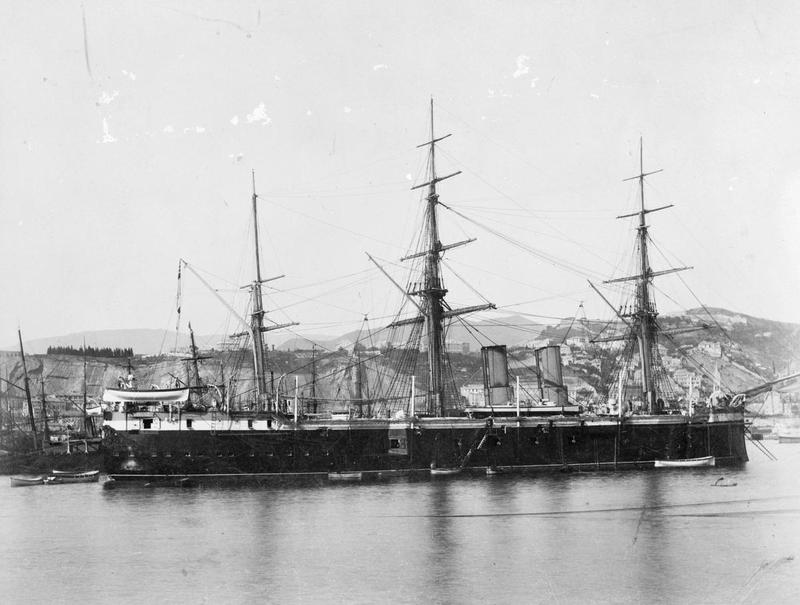
- Superb in harbour

History

United Kingdom
- Name: Superb
- Builder: Thames Ironworks and Shipbuilding Company, Leamouth, London
- Laid down: 1873
- Launched: 16 November 1875
- Completed: 15 November 1880
- Commissioned: 4 October 1880
- Fate: Broken up 1906

General characteristics
- Displacement: 9,710 tons
- Length: 332 ft 4 in (101.30 m)
- Beam: 59 ft (18 m)
- Draught: 24 ft 4 in (7.42 m) light; 26 ft 5 in (8.05 m) deep load
- Propulsion: One-shaft Maudslay horizontal; 6,580 ihp (4,910 kW)
- Sail plan: Barque rig
- Speed: 13.2 knots (24.4 km/h; 15.2 mph) (under power)
- Complement: 654
- Armament: From 1880: 16 × 10-inch (254 mm) rifled muzzle-loading guns; 6 × 20-pounder Rifled Breech Loaders (RBL); 4 × Mark II torpedo carriages; From 1891: 12 × 10 in (250 mm) muzzle-loading rifles; 10 × 6 in (150 mm) breech loaders; 6 × 6-pounder Quick Firing (QF) Guns; 10 × 3-pounder Quicki Firing (QF) Guns; 4 × torpedo tubes
- Armour: Belt: 7 in (180 mm)–12 in (300 mm); Battery: 12 in (300 mm); Bulkheads: 5 in (130 mm)–10 in (250 mm); Conning tower: 8 in (200 mm); Decks: 1.5 in (38 mm)

HMS Superb was an ironclad battleship designed by Sir Edward Reed for the Ottoman Navy, and was built in Britain by Thames Ironworks under the name of Hamidieh. She had both engines and sails.

Together with the two ships of the Belleisle class and HMS Neptune, she was compulsorily purchased by the British Government at the time of the Russian war scare of 1878. Her original design drawings show her as an enlarged Hercules with heavier armament and thicker armour; she was extensively altered from these plans after her purchase, leading to a five-year gap between her launch and her completion. Her poop and forecastle were enlarged, enabling her to carry sixteen ten-inch muzzle-loaders. This was the highest number of heavy guns of uniform calibre ever carried on a British battleship. She also received searchlights, torpedo discharge equipment, extra coal bunkers and extra cabins.

In her original design, the mess deck was unusually lofty. In her conversion an extra deck was added about five feet below the beams, to be used for slinging hammocks. It was always known as the "slave deck".

Although Superb was intended to be able to proceed under sail, and was barque-rigged to this end, it was found that she was unmanageable without power, so no sailing statistics were ever elicited.

She had a sister ship, the Mesudiye, which was commissioned by the Ottoman Navy as planned.

== Service history ==
She commissioned at Chatham for service in the Mediterranean on 4 October 1880, and remained on station for seven years. She took part in the bombardment of Alexandria under command of Captain Thomas Le Hunt Ward, where she fired 310 shells of 10-inch calibre at the Egyptian forts. She received ten hits in return, seven of them on her armour, with no casualties.

After reconstruction at Chatham from 1887 to 1891 she was guard ship on the Clyde until 1894, when she paid off into Fleet Reserve. Her only other sea time was at the time of the manoeuvres of 1900. Captain Rosslyn Wemyss was appointed in command on 25 November 1902, serving several months until spring the following year. In 1904 she was used as a hospital overflow ship for infectious cases, until she was sold in 1906.

== Gallery ==
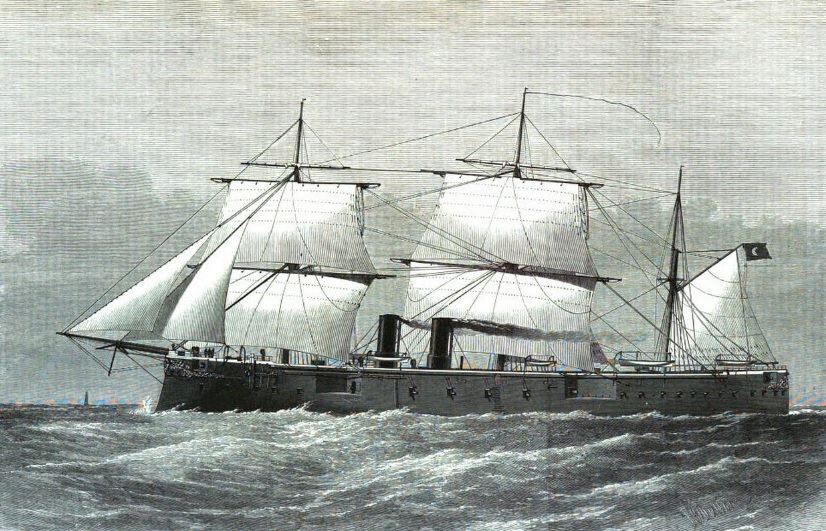
Illustration of the ship, had she been completed for the Ottoman Navy

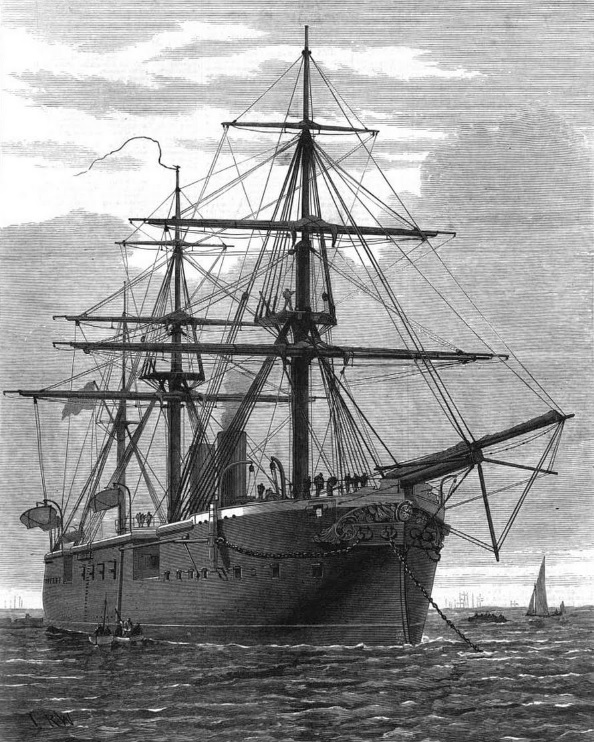

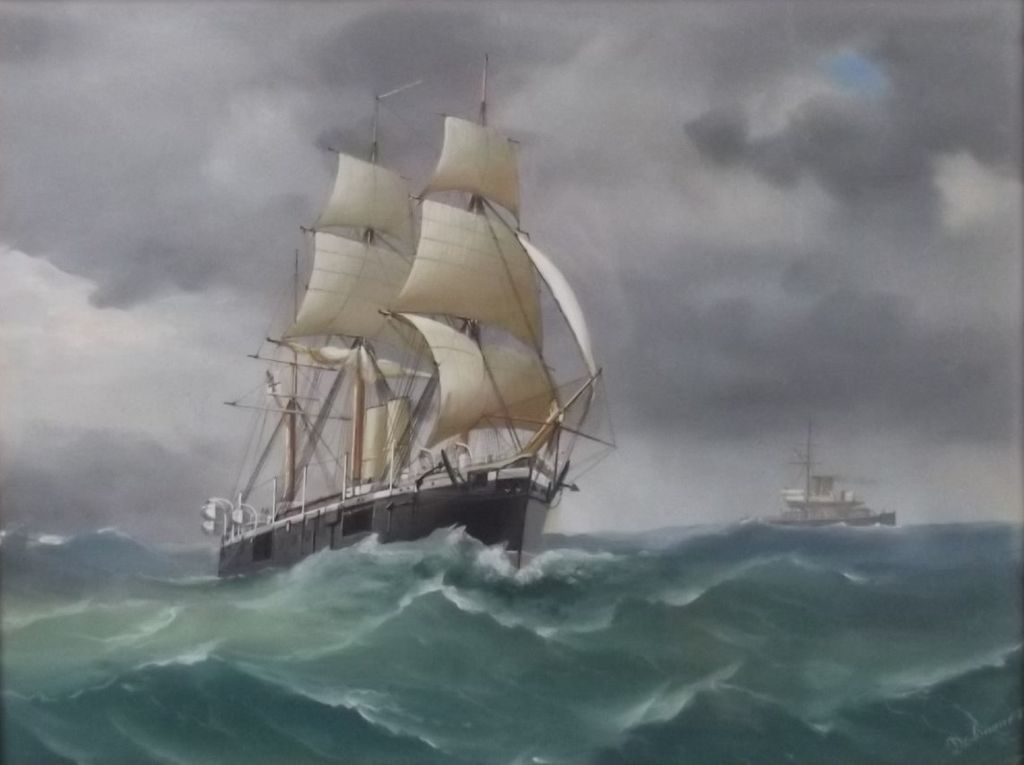
Painting of HMS Superb

== Bibliography ==
- Brown, David K. (1997). Warrior to Dreadnought: Warship Development 1860–1905. Chatham Publishing. ISBN 1-86176-022-1.
- Colledge, J. J.; Warlow, Ben (2006) [1969]. Ships of the Royal Navy: The Complete Record of All Fighting Ships of the Royal Navy from the 15th Century to the Present (3rd Rev ed.). London: Chatham Publishing. ISBN 978-1-86176-281-8. OCLC 67375475.
- Friedman, Norman (2018). British Battleships of the Victorian Era. Naval Institute Press. ISBN 978-1-68247-329-0.
- Parkes, Oscar (1990) [1966]. British Battleships, Warrior 1860 to Vanguard 1950: A History of Design, Construction, and Armament (New & rev. ed.). Naval Institute Press. ISBN 1-55750-075-4.
- Roberts, John (1979). "Great Britain (including Empire Forces)". In Chesneau, Roger & Kolesnik, Eugene M. (eds.). Conway's All the World's Fighting Ships 1860–1905. Mayflower Books. pp. 1–113. ISBN 0-8317-0302-4.
