= HMS Orion (1879) =

Belleisle-class ironclad

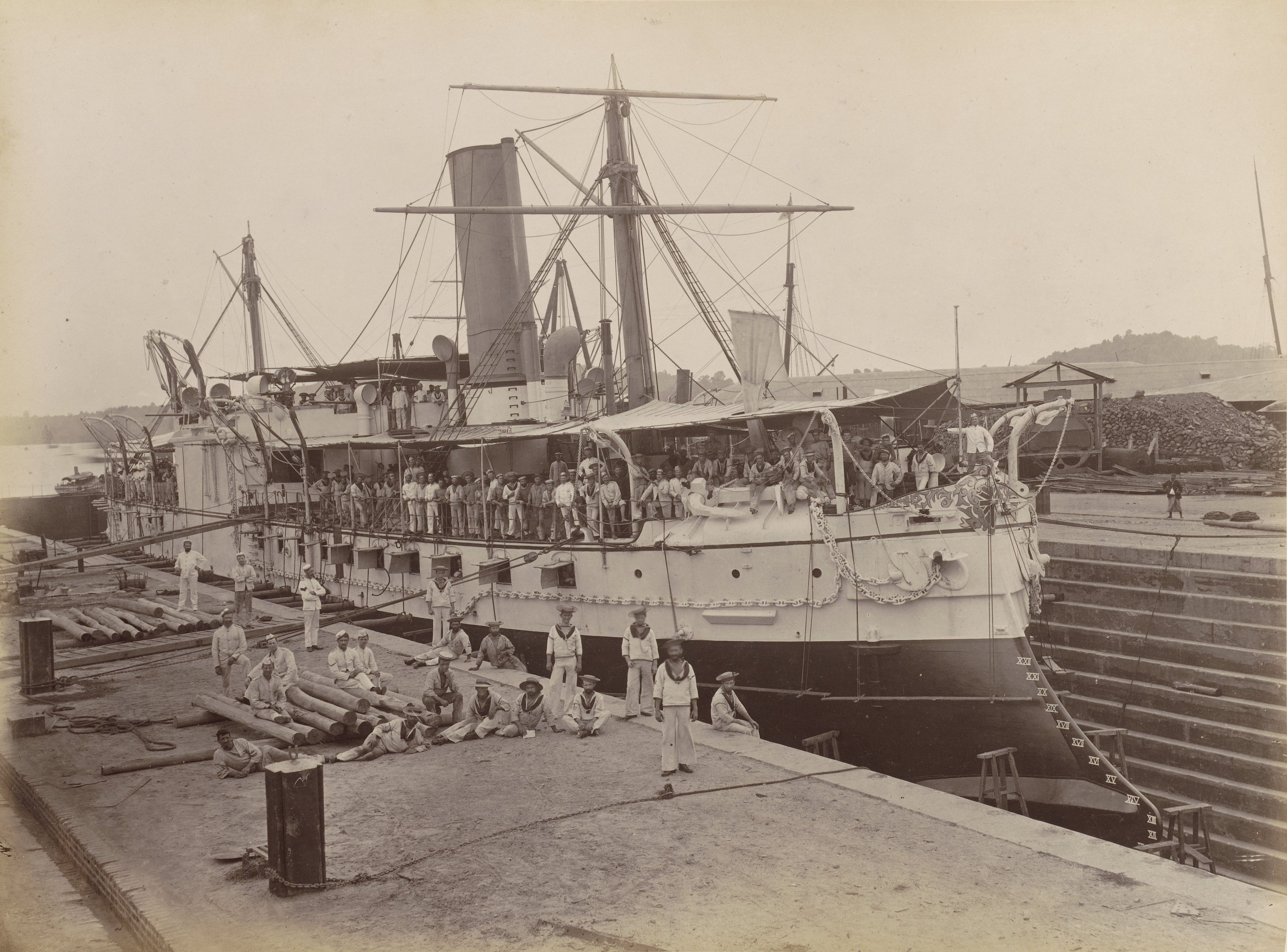
- Orion and crew in a dock of the Tanjong Pagar Dock Co. Ltd. in Singapore

History

United Kingdom
- Name: HMS Orion
- Builder: Samuda Brothers, Cubitt Town
- Laid down: 1875
- Launched: 23 January 1879
- Completed: 3 July 1882
- Fate: Broken up 1913

General characteristics
- Class & type: Belleisle-class ironclad
- Displacement: 4,870 tons
- Length: 245 ft (75 m) p/p
- Beam: 52 ft (16 m)
- Draught: 21 ft (6.4 m)
- Propulsion: Two-shaft Maudslay horizontal; I.H.P.= 4,040
- Speed: 12.2 kn (22.6 km/h)
- Complement: 249
- Armament: 4 × 12-inch (305 mm) 25-ton muzzle-loading rifles; 4 × 20-pounder breech-loaders; 2 × torpedo carriages
- Armour: Belt: 6 in (150 mm)–12 in (300 mm); Battery: 8 in (200 mm)–10 in (250 mm); Conning tower: 9 in (230 mm); Decks: 1 in (25 mm)–3 in (76 mm)

HMS Orion was a Belleisle-class ironclad of the Victorian Royal Navy. Originally constructed for the Ottoman Empire, and called Bourdjou-Zaffer, she was purchased by the British Government before completion.

She was designed by the Ottoman naval architect Ahmed Pasha and built by Samuda Brothers at Cubitt Town, London under contract for the Ottoman Empire. However, in 1878 she was purchased by the British Government whilst still under construction, in a reaction to the war between the Ottoman Empire and Russia. Her sister, HMS Belleisle, which was purchased at the same time in an essentially complete state, was modified so as to fit in, as far as possible, with contemporary design in the Royal Navy. Orion, being less advanced in construction at the time of her purchase, was ultimately completed along the same lines.

Her original design called for four 10-inch muzzle-loading rifles in a centrally located box battery, but this plan was upgraded to four 12-inch (305 mm) guns during her building. She, and Belleisle were the only British ships ever to mount 12-inch calibre artillery deployed to fire only on the broadside. It was possible, because of the provision of appropriate embrasures in the battery, to bring at least one gun to bear at any angle; proponents of the turret system of armament pointed out that in the turret system two, or possibly four guns could be made to bear on the same target.

== Service history ==
The Royal Navy purchased the Orion in February 1878; she was launched in January 1879. Her first commission started on 24 June 1882, and she was sent to reinforce the Mediterranean Fleet. But she arrived 14 days too late to take part in the Bombardment of Alexandria on 11–13 June. Landing parties from the Orion occupied Ismailia and formed part of the Naval Brigade at the Battle of Tell El Kebir on 13 September.

After paying off into the Reserve at Malta in May 1883, the Orion was recommissioned in April 1885. There was tension between Britain and Russia between 1885 and 1887 as a result of the Panjdeh incident. The Orion was ordered to shadow a Russian armoured cruiser that was going from the Mediterranean to the Far East. At Aden and Colombo, agents working for the Royal Navy purchased the entire stock of coal available, so that to recoal, the Russian cruiser had to buy its coal from them, and they were only willing to supply enough for the cruiser to steam at half speed. This enabled the Orion to overtake the Russian cruiser. The Orion crossed the Bay of Bengal in the favourable season; when the Russian cruiser reached Singapore, she found the Orion waiting for her. The Russian cruiser then went on to Vladivostok shadowed by the Audacious and the Shannon. After the commission ended in 1888, the Orion remained at Singapore as guardship until 1890, when she returned to the Mediterranean Fleet.

On 26 May 1890, whilst serving in the Mediterranean Fleet, the Orion accidentally collided with the Temeraire. The fleet was in close formation at sea, with the Temeraire as the last ship in the starboard column and the Orion as the next-to-last ship in the port column, which, with two cables (370 m) between the columns, resulted in the Orion being four points (45°) on the port bow of the Temeraire.

- According to G.A. Ballard, the Temeraire and the Orion were ordered to change positions, and the Orion hit the Temeraire with her ram, as described below.
- According to a contemporary newspaper, the Orion and the cruiser Phaeton were ordered to change positions, and the Orion hit the Temeraire with her propeller.

Ballard wrote that according to the instructions of the signal book used at the time, such movements had to comply with the traffic rules by moving from port to port. But due to the prevailing situation, the Orion's engines had to be stopped when turning to starboard. When the flagship's signal made, the Orion's watch officer kept his engines running, leaving little room to avoid a collision at full speed. Fortunately, the officer on watch of the Temeraire had recognized the impending danger and immediately gave the order to head for Orion instead of turning away from it. When the Orion's ram struck the Temeraire next to the engine room and below the armour belt, Temeraire's stern was already swinging away from it, which tore through the ship's outer skin and flooded a wing compartment. Later in 1890, the Orion went into second class reserve. After repair and refit, she was paid off into Dockyard Reserve at Chatham in September 1893.

The Orion was declared non-effective in November 1901. Three months later, in April 1902, she became a depot-ship at Malta for torpedo-boats, Captain Charles Madden in command. She served a brief commission in December 1906. In 1910 she was renamed Orontes, and served as a store-ship at Devonport. She was sold in June 1913 for £13,275.
