= HMS Hotspur (1870) =

Royal Navy ironclad ram warship

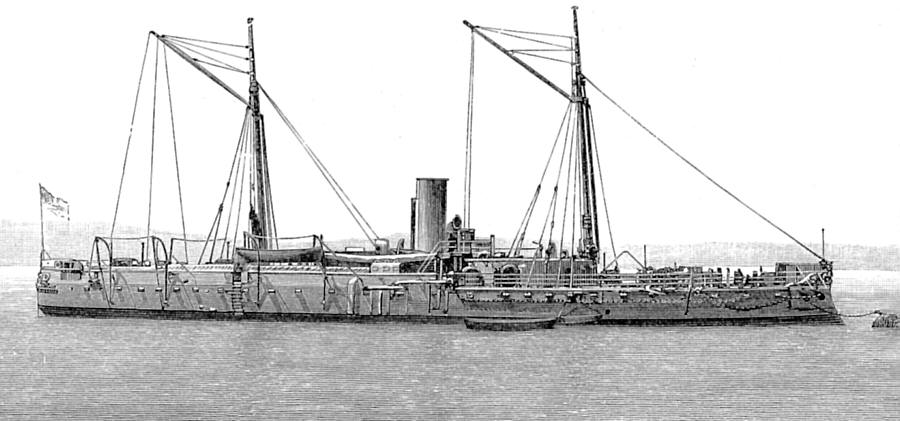
- none

History

United Kingdom
- Builder: Robert Napier and Sons, Govan, Scotland
- Laid down: 2 October 1868
- Launched: 19 March 1870
- Commissioned: 17 November 1871
- Fate: Scrapped 1904

General characteristics
- Displacement: 4,331 tons
- Length: 235 ft (72 m)
- Beam: 50 ft (15 m)
- Draught: 19 ft (5.8 m) light, 20 ft 8 in (6.30 m) deep load
- Propulsion: Two-shaft Napier reciprocating, I.H.P.= 3,500
- Speed: 12.65 knots (23.43 km/h; 14.56 mph)
- Complement: 209 officers and men
- Armament: 1871: An armoured ram; 1 × 12 inch (305 mm) 25-ton muzzle-loading rifle; 2 × 64-pounder muzzle-loading rifles; 1883: An armoured ram; 2 × 12 inch (305 mm) muzzle-loading rifles; 2 × BL 6-inch (152.4 mm) Mk II guns; 8 × 3 in (76 mm) quick-firers; 8 × machine guns
- Armour: Belt: 11 inches (280 mm) tapering to 8 inches (200 mm); Breastwork: 8 inches (200 mm); Turret: 10 inches (250 mm) front, 8.5 inches (220 mm) rear; Conning tower: 10 inches (250 mm) front, 6 inches (150 mm) rear; Deck: 2.75 inches (70 mm) tapering to 1 inch (25 mm)

HMS Hotspur was a Victorian Royal Navy ironclad ram – a warship armed with guns but whose primary weapon was a ram.

== Background ==
It had been recognised since the time of the Roman Empire or before that a ship, while it might carry weaponry, was itself a potent weapon if used as a missile against other ships. In the era of sail-powered warships with their intrinsic limitations of speed and manoeuvrability the practice of ramming opponents fell by default into disuse, although the concept remained alive. With the advent of steam-powered vessels, with their enhanced speed and lack of dependence for direction on the wind, the ram as a potent weapon of attack gained credibility in Naval circles and in Ship Constructors' departments. This first became apparent in the American Civil War, when many attempts were made by ships on both sides to ram their opponents, with almost uniform lack of success. (The Confederate Virginia (ex-Merrimack) rammed and sank the Federal Cumberland, but lost her ram and suffered significant structural damage.)

The battle which most influenced the exaggerated faith in the ram as a weapon was the battle of Lissa between Austria-Hungary and Italy in 1866. The Austrian Ferdinand Max rammed the (stationary) Italian Re d'Italia, which immediately heeled over and sank. This resulted in all ironclad battleships designed for the next forty years being built to carry a ram; a weapon which, while causing the loss of a number of ships accidentally, never sank another major enemy warship of any nationality.

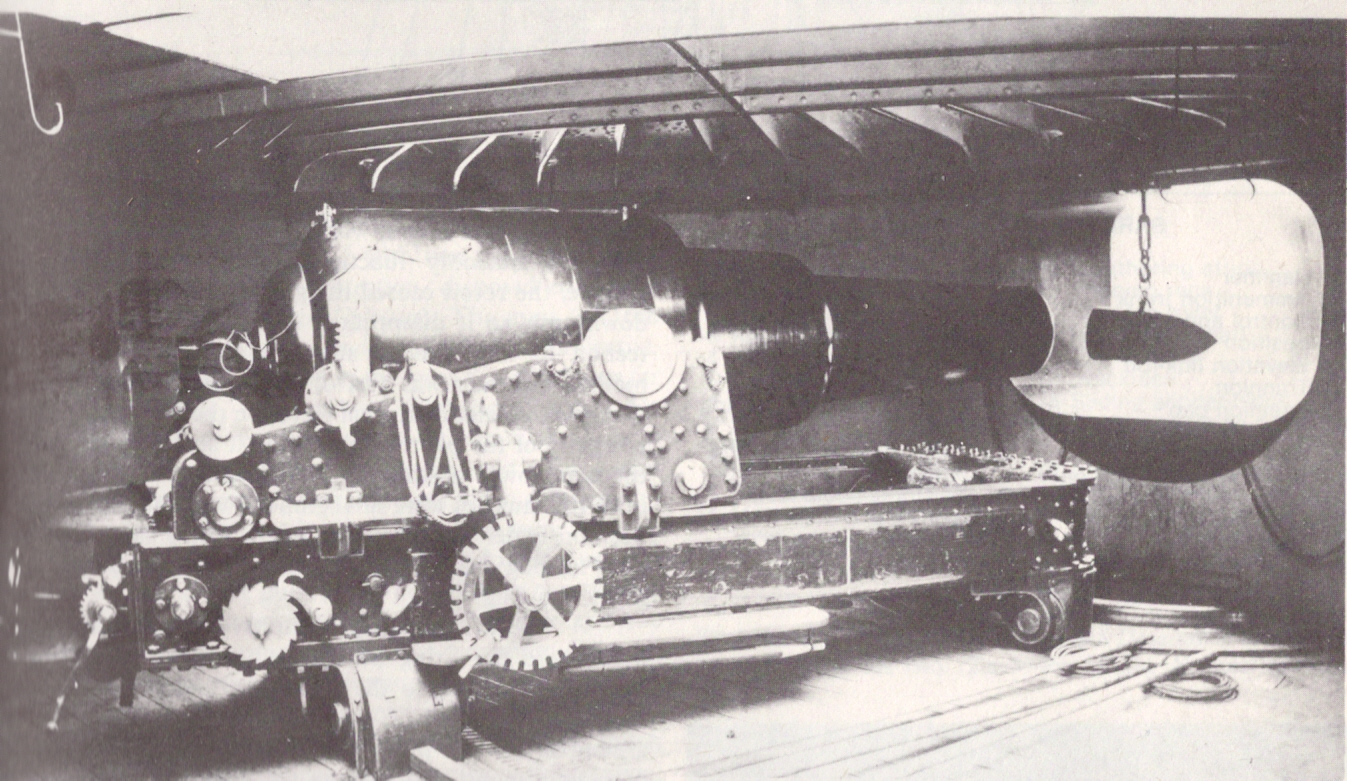
A 12-inch (305 mm) 25-ton muzzle-loading rifle on a broadside mounting aboard Hotspur. The deck beneath the mounting was a turntable which allowed the gun to rotate between several gunports within a fixed circular armored turret. One of the gun's shells is hanging in the gunport in front of the gun.

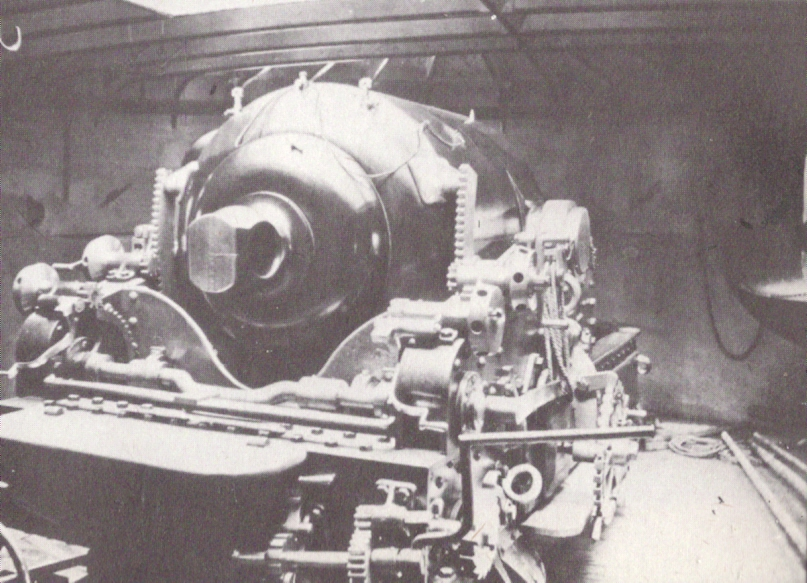
A rear view of a 12-inch (305 mm) 25-ton gun aboard Hotspur.

== Design ==
Hotspur was designed to work with the Fleet, to bring into action her main weapon, her ram. This projected some ten feet (3 m) ahead of her bow perpendicular, and was reinforced by an extension of the armoured belt.

It was assumed that the bearings upon which a usual turret turned would not survive the shock of the impact consequent upon the use of the ram against an enemy ship. Her single 12-inch (305 mm) gun was therefore positioned in a fixed cupola perforated by four firing-ports through which the gun could be discharged. None of these ports allowed the gun to be fired straight ahead, where a potential ramming target would be situated. It was therefore only possible to engage these targets with the gun if the ramming attack missed.

As the maximum speed of Hotspur was less than virtually all of her potential targets, it quickly became apparent that ramming attacks on ships under way were almost guaranteed to miss, and she quickly descended from being a ship held to be of great military value to be the most useless member of the battle-fleet.

She was reconstructed by Laird & Sons Co., and was given a revolving turret containing two 12-inch guns, new boilers and additional armour.

== Service history ==
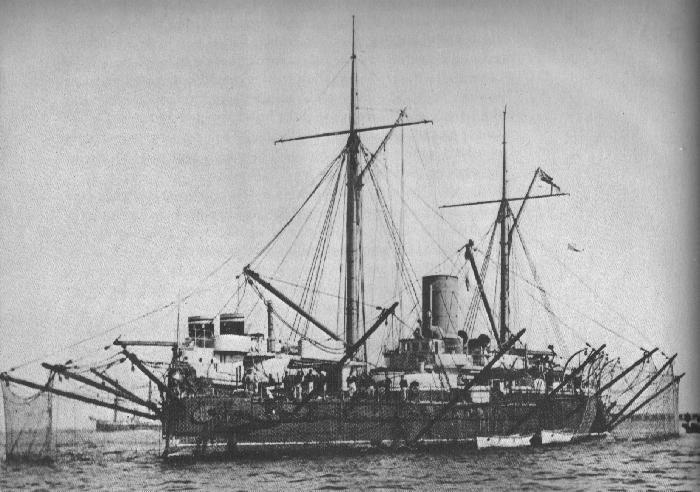
Hotspur with her anti-torpedo net deployed

Hotspur was commissioned at Devonport in 1871. On 26 January, she collided with the steamship Lady Woodhouse off Plymouth. Both vessels were severely damaged. Hotspur was taken in to Plymouth for repairs.

Her 12-inch 25-ton gun was fired on the Glatton during a live trial in 1873.

She remained in reserve until 1876. She served with HMS Rupert in the Sea of Marmara during the Russo-Turkish war of 1878. She then returned to Devonport, where she remained until her major reconstruction, undertaken by Laird & Sons Co. between 1881 and 1883. Her only active service thereafter was with the Particular Service Squadron of 1885. She was guardship at Holyhead until 1893, was again in reserve until 1897, and was posted thereafter to serve as guardship at the Royal Naval Dockyard in the Imperial fortress colony of Bermuda, where she stayed until sold.
