= One Housing Group =

One Housing Group was a housing association based in London and the south east of the United Kingdom. They manage 16,000 homes and provide support to residents who needs special help, through their social care arm, One Support. As of 2015-16, they had an annual turnover of £255m and employed ~1800 staff.

Their Chief Executive is Richard Hill, and they are a member of the National Housing Federation. Their housing stock is mainly in the London boroughs of Barnet, Camden, Enfield, Hackney, Haringey, Islington, Newham, Tower Hamlets and the City of Westminster, as well as in Berkshire.

One Housing Group was formed by a merger of Community Housing Association and the Toynbee Housing Association. Community was formed in 1972, and managed 5,000 homes at the times of the merger in July 2007. Toynbee was formed in 1962 and managed 3,000 homes at merger, alongside a further 2,100 homes managed by Toynbee Island Homes, a charitable subsidiary formed to look after stock transferred from London Borough Tower Hamlets on the Isle of Dogs.

As of 2024, One Housing Group had almost fully been integrated into the Riverside Group, which now had combined stock levels of around 75,000 properties, across the United Kingdom.

== Strategy ==
According to their annual report 2013-14, One Housing says they:

fund the construction of our new homes by selling on the open market. We do this independently and through joint venture partnerships.

In 2013/14 we sold 90 private sale and 113 shared ownership properties and plan to complete a further 330 private sale and 49 shared ownership homes during 2014/15.

We think we have a win-win approach to building homes. We increase supply for those wanting to buy their home and at the same time use the profits to house those on lower incomes.

In their current five-year plan, they say they aim to create 800 new homes for the elderly and 230 homes will including on site care. £74m will be spent on maintenance of their existing housing stock. In 2014 they engaged 17 firms to build 900 homes at a contractual value of £900m.

== Official criticism of governance ==
In its 2013 audit, the Social Housing Regulator stated that One Housing Group need to improve its governance and oversight:

the board needs to enhance its oversight and scrutiny of the group’s activities to maintain compliance with regulatory requirements. The group is in the process of implementing a suite of recommendations arising from a governance review which will better align governance arrangements with the corporate plan.
… Whilst the group has recently been successful in delivering planned outcomes and its financial position has improved, the regulator needs further assurance that the level of oversight by the board is of the standard necessary to ensure this continues. The board also needs to strengthen its capacity to carry out this scrutiny role and to hold the executive to account. Reporting to the board has not been sufficiently frequent and detailed enough for the board to be clear about current performance and issues arising across all of the group’s business.

In 2015, they noted that governance had improved. They noted that the main risks were now financial, with a plan that is highly dependent on sales receipts from house building.

"The key exposure arises from the extent of the group’s reliance within its business plan on sales receipts, from both shared ownership and, more significantly, market sales activity. Over the plan’s first five years, total sales receipts of £513m are forecast, of which £404m are assumed from market sales. In each of the plan’s first two years, total forecast sales surpluses exceed those of the group as a whole, with market sales margins representing 80% and 83% of the total surplus respectively. OHG does have a recent track record of successful sales programmes however, given the significant future cash flows involved in this area of activity alongside limited headroom on the main gearing covenant, risks relating to liquidity management and covenant compliance will need to continue to be effectively monitored and controlled."

== Controversy ==
=== Isle of Dogs and Island Homes ===
One Housing Group run a number of former council housing estates on the Isle of Dogs, which were transferred to Toynbee Island Homes in 2005. These had been built by various local authorities: Barkantine (completed by the Greater London Council), Kingsbridge (London County Council), St John's (Poplar Borough Council ) and Samuda (completed by the Greater London Council). All four estates had been taken over by the London Borough of Tower Hamlets by the time of stock transfer.

Tower Hamlets ran a stock transfer consultation, followed by a local referendum:

Residents had used the consultation process to negotiate Island Homes being a resident-led organisation … "Island Homes’ Board of 15 would include eight residents – one tenant and one leaseholder from each of the four estates. The individual estates were to determine their nominees. Toynbee specifically promised that governance arrangement in its Offer Document to tenants, and there is little doubt it played a massive part in securing its majority in the ballot."

However, despite the promises made, no contractual provision was made during the stock transfer. In 2008, after the merger of the Toynbee and Community Housing Trusts, the new One Housing Group suspended the Island Homes Board and appointed new trustees, citing management problems.

Around a third of TIH homes failed to meet the Decent Homes Standard used by the Housing Corporation in 2007, the regulator at the time.

In 2012, One Housing abolished the separate management structure after a consultation with residents, bringing the stock directly under its control. Some local residents objected, in part because of the promises made at the time of the stock transfer, and wrote to the housing minister asking him to block the changes saying "OHG has, in effect stolen the right of Island Homes to govern themselves… We ask you to intervene and suspend the merger process."

==== Project Stone ====
According to The Wharf, the total stock of former Toynbee Island Homes 2,000 homes could be replaced by 9,000 newly built properties by the group, under Project Stone. Most would be sold on the open market, "with “high earning financial sector workers” named as potential buyers."

Some locals and councillors claim that complaints about maintenance of the existing stock are high. As a result of a petition highlighting a loss of trust between residents and OHG, Tower Hamlets withdrew their "preferred partnership" status from One Housing.

=== Islington and Kingston communes ===
A group of 18 tenants facing eviction from four joined Victorian terraces in Islington Park Street took their complaints to Twitter and local media in 2015. The Crescent Road Community also face eviction from their communal property in Coombe Hill, Kingston.

The two linked communities collected an 8,000 strong petition asking for their communities not to be evicted.

=== Pay cuts and union disputes ===
Unite members held a four-day strike in 2014 after the suspension of their steward Bryan Kennedy. He had led a campaign against pay cuts in 2013, and was suspended immediately prior to a further round of negotiations on new pay reductions. One Housing Group denied any connection between the suspension and the negotiations. A Unite spokesperson accused One Housing of being "an incredibly bad employer", which had cut wages of employees while increasing the salary of their CEO.

=== King's Cross Central ===
A 2012 investigation by the Independent and Corporate Watch found that "people with a history of mental health problems are being excluded from the social housing built there while the developers and local council have also set quotas for the number of homeless and unemployed people" at King's Cross Central's 500 social housing units.

=== Chief Executive Salary Survey 2020 ===
According to Inside Housing, the Chief Executive Officer Richard Hill had £211,364 total salary (salary £205,964 + bonus £0 + car allowance £5,400) for the fiscal year 2019/2020. This is a reduction of 6.9% compared to the previous fiscal year with a total salary of £226,936.

=== Proposed partnership with Riverside Group ===
On 24 June 2021 One Housing Group and Riverside Group announced their plan to form a new partnership. If confirmed, then One Housing Group would join Riverside Group as a subsidiary for two years only. It was claimed that this would allow One Housing Group to run as a separate entity, continuing the current business model while already consulting the parent Riverside Group on major decisions and slowly aligning and integrating the day to day running of One Housing Group to the needs and culture of Riverside Group. At the end of the two year transition period, One Housing Group will then simply be dissolved. Housing stock will then belong to Riverside Group who will also manage the newly integrated properties.
