= Westwood, Baillie =

Coordinates: 51.49468°N 0.00687°W

Westwood, Baillie and Company
- Industry: Shipbuilding, Engineering
- Founded: 1856
- Headquarters: London Yard, Cubitt Town, London, UK
- Key people: Joseph Westwood; Robert Baillie
- Products: Naval ships Tugs; Bridges

Westwood, Baillie and Co was a Victorian engineering and shipbuilding company based at London Yard in Cubitt Town, London.

The company was set up in 1856 by Robert Baillie and Joseph Westwood, previously managers of Ditchburn and Mares shipyard.

Partly as a result of a fall in demand due to the financial crisis of 1866, a period of financial stress and reorganisation resulted in Westwood and Baillie acting as managers for the London Engineering & Iron Shipbuilding Company Ltd, until they regained control in 1872.

For much of its life the company produced iron and steel work for bridges. In 1887 the company made the girders for the Lansdowne Bridge over the Indus River, then the longest rigid girder bridge in the world. Work on a more modest scale included a railway footbridge that can still be seen at Romford railway station, and the 1879 swing bridges over the Royal Albert Dock. The company also contributed to the construction of the Attock Khurd Bridge, built in 1880 between what are now the provinces of Khyber Pakhtunkhwa and Punjab in Pakistan. The bridge remains in great shape and is a major attraction for tourists and history enthusiasts. In 1890, the company provided its services in constructing an iron bridge connecting Tripunithura and Poonithura, also known as the bridge over the Padinjare Puzha, in the Kingdom of Cochin (present-day Kerala, India) during the reign of H.H. Kerala Varma V. This iron bridge (Irumbu Palam) is still in use.

The company was wound up in 1893 and in 1895 Baillie was declared bankrupt. Joseph Westwood continued in business at Napier Yard as Joseph Westwood and Co. There is a large monument to him in Tower Hamlets Cemetery. The Railway footbridge at Wymondham, Norfolk was also built by the company.

London Yard was subsequently taken over by Yarrows.

== Notable products ==
- Iron Bridge (irumpupalam, poonithura.Cochin) 1890
- Tug Powerful, 1857
- River Chenab Bridge (Chiniot), Punjab Pakistan 1932
- Taptee Bridge (India), 1858
- HMS Resistance, 1861.
- HMS Valiant, 1863 (completed under the ownership of Thames Ironworks)
- Iron clipper Royal Edward, 1864
- Tugs Robert Bruce, 1865, Scotia, 1874 and Granville, 1876
- Jervois Swing Bridge, Port Adelaide South Australia, 1878
- Attock Bridge (now in Pakistan) over the Indus, 1880
- Colesberg Bridge over the Orange River (Northern Cape, South Africa), 1885
- Barkly Bridge over the Vaal River (Northern Cape, South Africa), 1885
- Colenso Bridge over the Tugela River, Colony of Natal, South Africa, 1879
- Lansdowne Bridge (now in Pakistan) over the Indus, 1887-8
- Motueka River (Kohatu) Bridge (Tasman District, New Zealand) 1888
- Puente ferroviario Birris over the Birris River (Paraíso Cartago, Costa Rica), 1889
- Tugs Mabel, 1890 and Donovan, 1890
- Khidderpore Swivel Bridge, Kolkata Port, 1890
