= RML 12-inch 25-ton gun =

Naval artillery

Ordnance RML 12-inch 25-ton gun
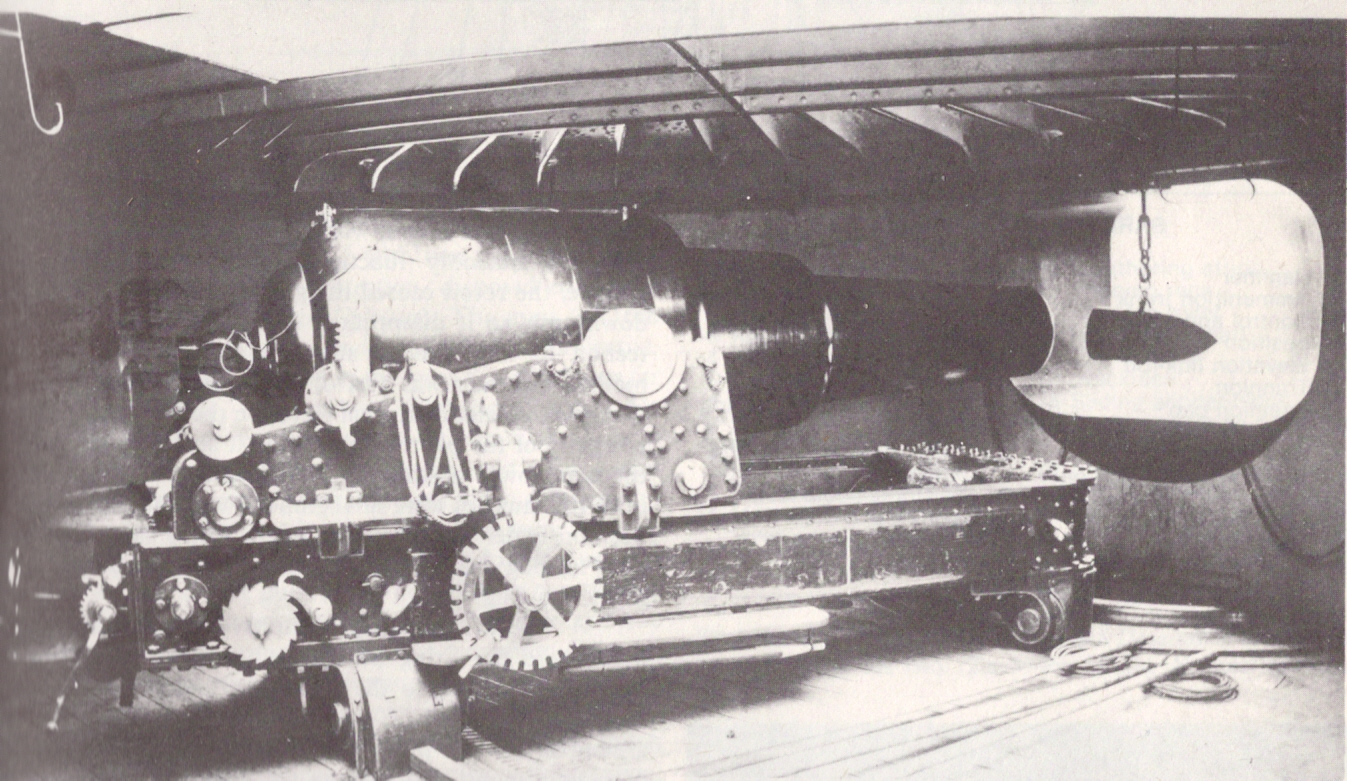
- A 12-inch (305 mm) 25-ton gun in an armoured turret aboard the ram HMS Hotspur. A shell is suspended near the muzzle ready for loading.
- Type: Naval gun Coast defence gun

Service history
- Used by: Royal Navy

Production history
- Designed: 1864–1866
- Manufacturer: Royal Arsenal
- Unit cost: £1,716
- Produced: 1866 – 187?
- Variants: Mk I, Mk II

Specifications
- Mass: Mk I : 23.5 long tons (23,900 kg); Mk II : 25 long tons (25,000 kg)
- Barrel length: 145 inches (3.7 m) (bore + chamber)
- Shell: 600 to 608.4 pounds (272.2 to 276.0 kg) (Palliser); 497 pounds (225.4 kg) (Common & Shrapnel)
- Calibre: 12-inch (304.8 mm)
- Muzzle velocity: 1,300 feet per second (400 m/s)

The RML 12-inch 25-ton guns were large rifled muzzle-loading guns of mid-late 1800s used as primary armament on British ironclad turret battleships and coastal monitors, and also ashore for coast defence. They were the shorter and less powerful of the two 12-inch (305-mm) British RML guns, the other being the 35-ton gun.

== Design ==
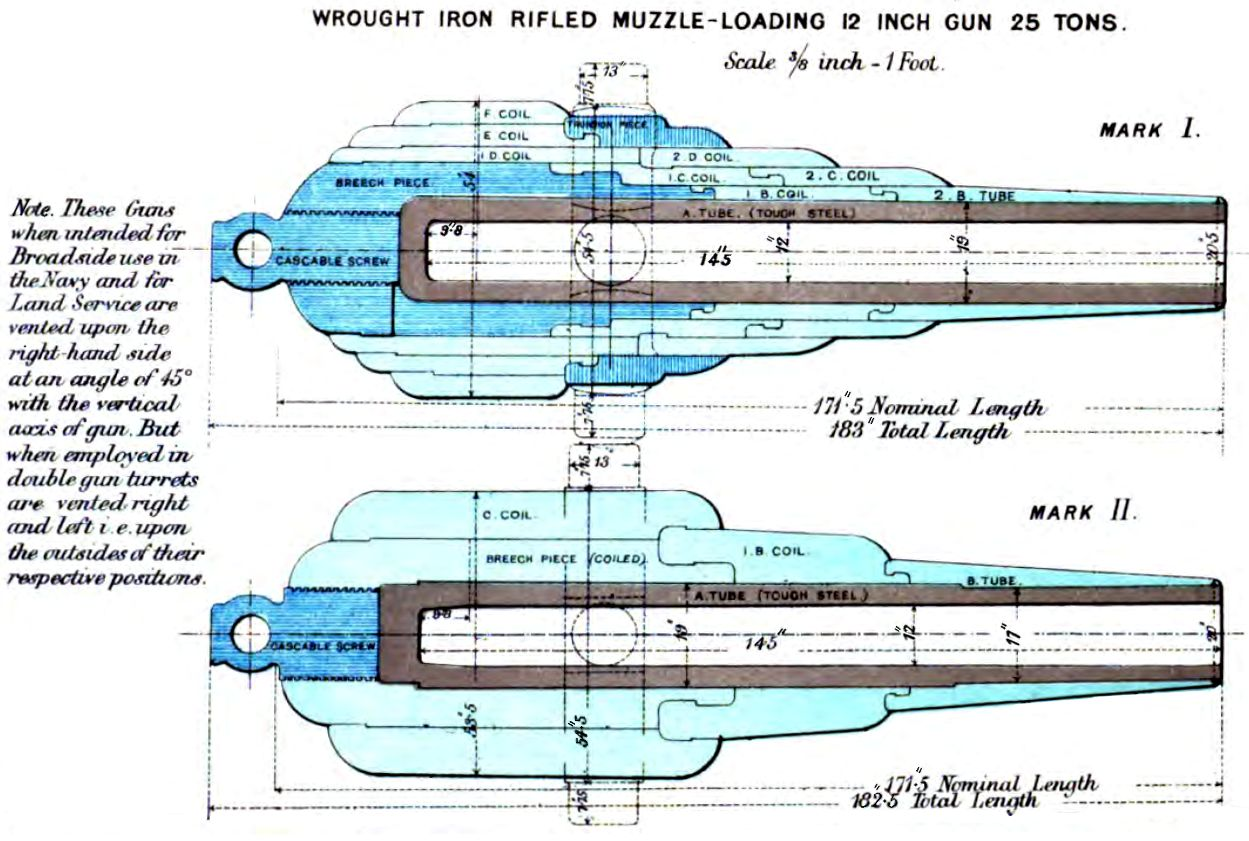
Mk I & II gun construction

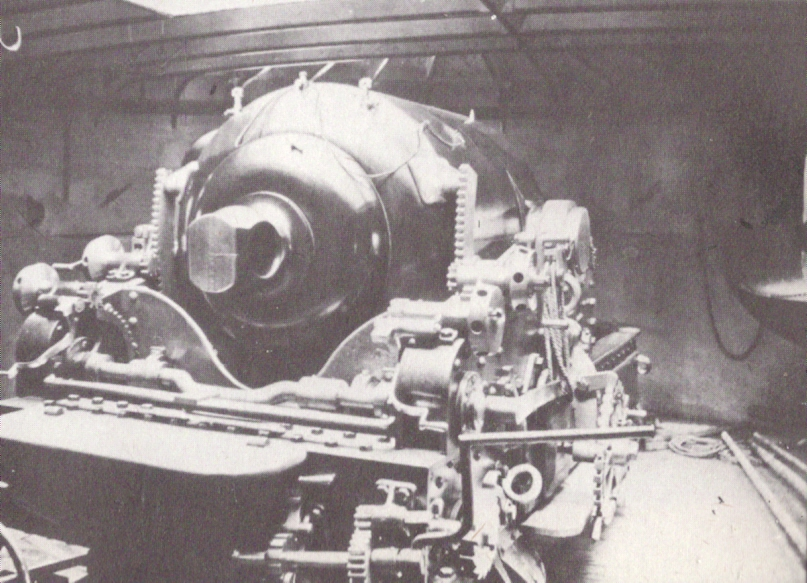
Rear view of a 12-inch (305 mm) 25-ton gun aboard the ram HMS Hotspur.

=== Mark I ===
Four guns were first made in 1866 with a toughened mild steel tube surrounded by multiple wrought iron coils on the original Armstrong pattern.

=== Mark II ===
While strong, the multiple coils were considered too expensive for construction in quantity. From 1867 guns were built on the simplified and hence cheaper "Fraser" system involving fewer but larger coils similar to the 10-inch (254-mm) Mk II gun. The guns were not considered a success, with the rifling twist of 1 in 100 increasing to 1 in 50 considered insufficient for accuracy, and guns were retubed in 11-inch (279-mm) calibre when their bores wore out.

== Naval service ==
Guns were mounted on :

- HMS Captain (1869) : 4
- HMS Monarch (1868) : 4
- HMS Hotspur (1870) : 2
- HMS Glatton (1871) : 2
- HMS Belleisle (1876) : 4
- HMS Orion (1879) : 4

== Ammunition ==
When the gun was first introduced projectiles had several rows of "studs" which engaged with the gun's rifling to impart spin. Some time after 1878, "attached gas-checks" were fitted to the bases of the studded shells, reducing wear on the guns and improving their range and accuracy. Subsequently, "automatic gas-checks" were developed which could rotate shells, allowing the deployment of a new range of studless ammunition. Thus, any particular gun potentially operated with a mix of studded and studless ammunition.

The gun's primary projectile was 600 to 608-pound (272- to 275-kilogram) "Palliser" armour-piercing shot, fired with a "Battering charge" of 85 pounds (38.5 kilograms) of "P" (gunpowder) or 67 pounds (30.4 kilograms) "R.L.G." (gunpowder) for maximum velocity and hence penetrating power. Shrapnel and Common (exploding) shells weighed 497 pounds (225.5 kilograms) and were fired with a "Full charge" of 55 pounds (25 kilograms) "P" or 50 pounds (22.7 kilograms) "R.L.G.".

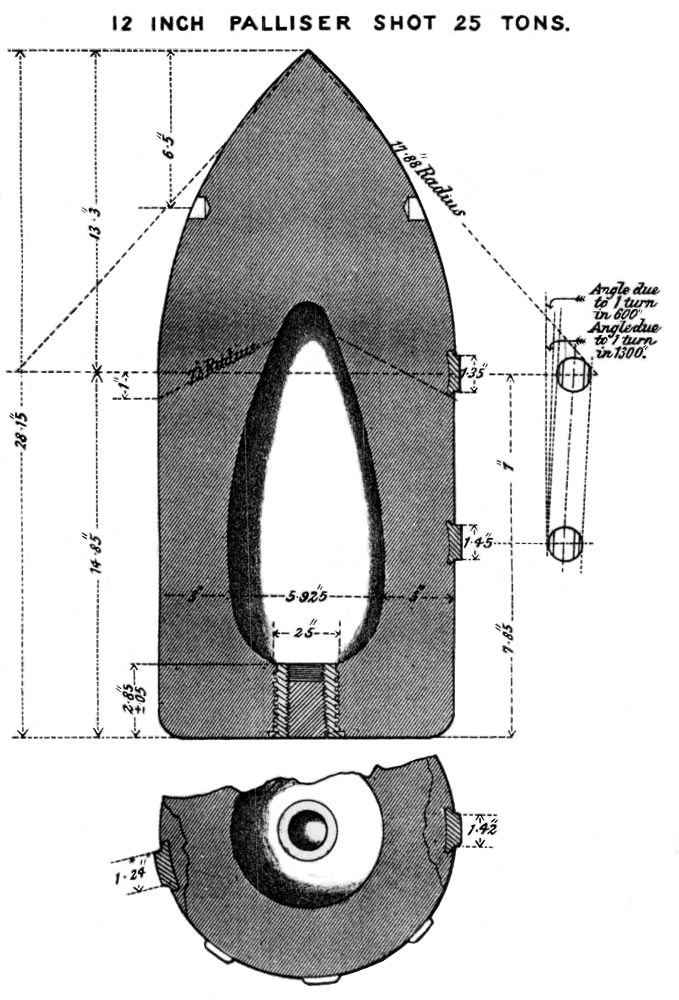
Palliser shot

== See also ==
- List of naval guns

== Surviving examples ==
- at Drake's Island, Plymouth, UK

== Bibliography ==
- Treatise on Ammunition. War Office, UK, 1877
- Treatise on the construction and manufacture of ordnance in the British service. War Office, UK, 1877
- Text Book of Gunnery, 1887. LONDON : PRINTED FOR HIS MAJESTY'S STATIONERY OFFICE, BY HARRISON AND SONS, ST. MARTIN'S LANE
- Sir Thomas Brassey, The British Navy, Volume II. London: Longmans, Green and Co. 1882
