= Murder of Eliza Samudio =

2010 murder in Minas Gerais, Brazil

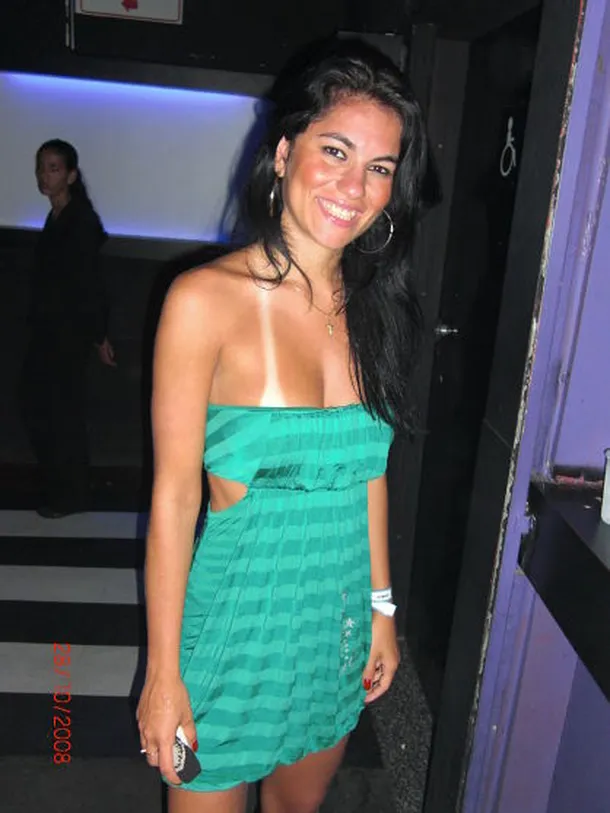
- Location: Esmeraldas (victim's private prison), Minas Gerais; Vespasiano (victim's alleged death), Minas Gerais
- Date: 2010
- Attack type: Kidnapping, aggression, murder
- Deaths: 1
- Victim: Eliza Silva Samudio
- Perpetrators: Bruno Fernandes das Dores de Souza; Luiz Henrique Ferreira Romão (Macarrão); Marcos Aparecido dos Santos (Bola); Elenilson Vítor da Silva; Wemerson Marques de Souza (Coxinha); Dayanne Rodrigues; Fernanda Gomes de Castro
- Defenders: Raul Andrade; Henry Wagner Vasconcelos Castro
- Accused: Bruno Fernandes das Dores de Souza; Luiz Henrique Ferreira Romão (Macarrão); Marcos Aparecido dos Santos (Bola); Elenilson Vítor da Silva; Wemerson Marques de Souza (Coxinha); Dayanne Rodrigues; Fernanda Gomes de Castro
- Convictions: All suspects were tried by popular jury. Macarrão was sentenced to 15 years in prison for jailing and murdering Samudio and concealing a corpse. Fernanda was sentenced to 5 years in prison for the kidnapping and false imprisonment of Samudio and Bruninho (Samudio's son with Bruno). Bruno was sentenced to 22 years and 3 months in prison under closed regime. Dayanna was acquitted. Bola was sentenced to 22 years.
- Judge: Marixa Rodrigues

Brazilian model Eliza Silva Samudio was murdered in June 2010 by association football goalkeeper Bruno Fernandes das Dores de Souza, known simply as Bruno. During the investigations, one of the witnesses reported that Samudio had been killed by strangulation before being dismembered and buried under a layer of concrete. Bruno was convicted and sentenced to fifteen years in prison, but was released after serving only 10 years.

== Biography of Eliza Samudio ==
Eliza Silva Samudio was born in Foz do Iguaçu, Paraná (in Brazil) on February 22, 1985, to architect Luiz Carlos Samudio and farmer Sônia Fátima Silva Moura. Her parents lived together in Foz do Iguaçu for a year. Sônia was often attacked by her husband. Because of this and for financial reasons, she left six-month-old Eliza with her father. From then on, she saw her infant occasionally. After some time, Sônia went to live in Mato Grosso do Sul, where she remarried and had a son. She operated a small pepper production farm with her husband. When Eliza turned ten, she went to live with her mother in Campo Grande for a year before returning to her father.

Since the age of 13, Samudio wanted to leave her hometown to become a model on the Rio–São Paulo axis, and she moved to the capital of São Paulo at the age of eighteen. Not knowing anyone in town and experiencing financial difficulties, she began working as a call girl to support herself until she managed to become a model. Lawyer Jader Marques confirmed in an interview that Samudio participated in fashion shows and editorials, acted in pornographic films from 2005 to 2009, in addition to participating in sexy photoshoots for the erotica producer Brasileirinhas with the artistic name of Fernanda Farias.

Eliza Samudio
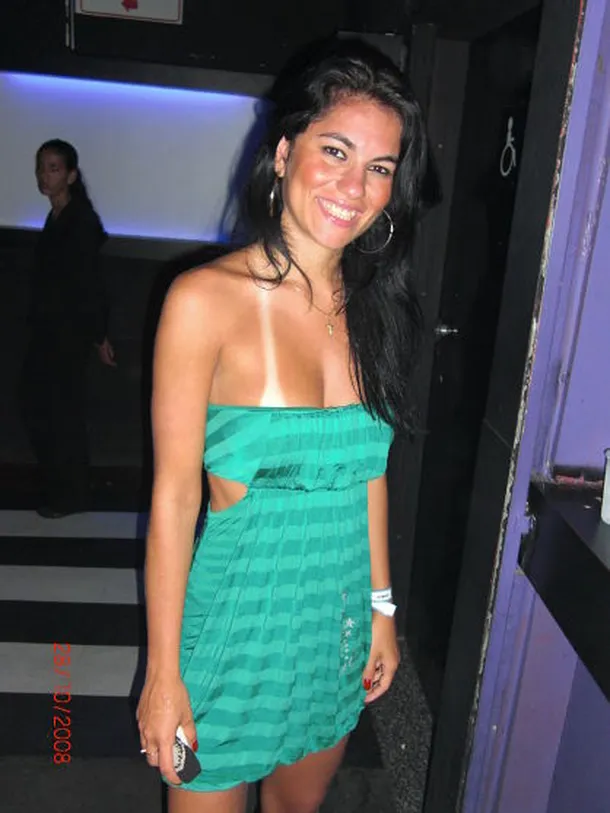
- Born: Eliza Silva Samudio; February 22, 1985; Foz do Iguaçu, PR
- Died: June 10, 2010 (age 25) (allegedly); Vespasiano, MG
- Cause of death: Murder
- Occupations: Model, actress

== Background ==
Samudio and Bruno had known each other since 2008, according to witnesses. Bruno claimed that he met Samudio in May 2009, at a barbecue in Rio de Janeiro. According to Bruno, he met Samudio at a party and had sex with her at the home of another Flamengo player, during which his condom broke. He claimed that such parties are common among Brazilian athletes. After the party, both began to meet frequently, and Samudio left the field of sex work to be with Bruno at his request. Despite already being married, Bruno promised that he would separate from his wife to be with Samudio.

In August 2009, Bruno ended his relationship with Samudio after she announced that she was pregnant with his child and refused to have an abortion.

=== First assault ===
On October 13, 2009, Samudio filed a complaint with the police saying that the day prior she had been kept in private prison by Bruno and his friends "Russo" and "Macarrão", and forced to take abortive substances. She also accused them of having beaten her and said that Bruno had pointed a gun at her head. The Legal Medical Institute of Rio de Janeiro and the police only concluded their forensic examinations in July 2010, when the model's disappearance was already treated as a homicide.

After being compelled by Maria Aparecida Mallet, a delegate from the Specialized Police Station for Women (DEAM) of Jacarepaguá, to keep a distance of at least 300 meters (980 feet) from Samudio, Bruno released a statement in which he denied the aggression:

"It's not the first time she's made up this bunch of lies to try to harm me. The other time she didn't prove anything and she won't prove it again, because she made up this whole story. It got to the point where, yesterday, I sent an email to some newspaper offices in Rio saying that I missed Flamengo training because I was with her. But I attended both morning and afternoon practices, as all the journalists present could confirm. That's why I decided that I'm only going to speak through my lawyer, who will take all the necessary measures to prevent her from continuing to try to harm me. She doesn't conform because I've already made it clear that I don't want any kind of relationship with her. I'm not going to give this girl the 15 minutes of fame she so desperately craves."

In 2009, judge Ana Paula Delduque Migueis Laviola de Freitas denied Samudio's request for protection, arguing that Samudio did not have an intimate relationship with Bruno, and that she was "trying to punish the aggressor under penalty of trivializing the purpose of the Maria da Penha Law".

The judge then referred the case to a criminal court. In her decision, she asserted that the Maria da Penha Law "has as its goal the protection of the family, whether it comes from a stable union or marriage, as well as the objective of protecting women in the affective relationship, and not in the purely occasional and sexual". She did not consider Samudio's condition, five months pregnant.

Samudio's child was born on February 10, 2010, in São Paulo, where Samudio was living at a friend's house since discovering her pregnancy. Bruno refused to acknowledge the paternity, accusing her of wanting to give the "coup of the belly" because he has money. Samudio filed a paternity claim after arriving to live with her son in the city of Rio de Janeiro in hotels paid for by Bruno. She started demanding child support and accused him of assault, for which Bruno was indicted.

In a statement released on July 2, the police revealed the referrals only then given to the drug test:

"The General Department of Technical-Scientific Police of the Civil Police of Rio de Janeiro (DGPTC) informs that a group of substances considered abortifacient was found in the urine of Eliza Samudio. The experts who analyzed the collected material decided, given the complexity of the case, to send the material to the UFRJ laboratory, with which the Civil Police maintains an agreement in order to confirm 100% of the analysis made by them, excluding any possibility of such grouping. belong to other compounds. According to experts, such a mixture can also be found even in the simultaneous consumption of alcoholic beverages with tobacco. According to the DGPTC, the final result will be ready next Monday, July 5th."

== Murder ==
According to police investigations, before disappearing, Samudio was at Bruno's farm in Esmeraldas, Minas Gerais, at his request. She went to the farm on June 4, 2010, with Bruno seemingly willing to negotiate a settlement. The model's disappearance occurred during that trip. She still held out hope of having a reconciliation with the goalkeeper. Bruno claimed that she left the farm of her own accord, and that she abandoned her child with a common colleague of the former couple. The boy was found in a favela in Ribeirão das Neves and Dayanne Rodrigues do Carmo Souza, Bruno's wife, was suspected of having left him there, and was also investigated.

On June 26, 2010, the Civil Police of Minas Gerais declared Bruno a suspect in Samudio's disappearance. On July 6, 2010, Bruno's 17-year-old cousin was found at Bruno's residence in Barra da Tijuca and claimed to have hit Samudio with the butt of a gun. He further claimed that while unconscious, she was taken to Minas Gerais, and there dismembered by drug dealers at the behest of the goalkeeper and given to Rottweiler dogs. The model's bones were then entombed in concrete. This version was not confirmed by the police. On July 8, 2010, former police officer Marcos Aparecido dos Santos, known as "Neném", "Paulista" or "Bola" and also accused of killing Samudio, was arrested by the Military Police of Minas Gerais. The date of death is estimated by investigators to have been June 10, 2010.

After the disappearance, Samudio's mother asked for custody of her child, which was granted. Samudio's father pleaded in court for custody of his grandson and recognition of paternity by Bruno. Custody was revoked from the maternal grandfather because it was discovered that he had raped a ten-year-old girl in Paraná, some years ago, and it was also discovered that he allowed men to abuse his daughter during her childhood in exchange for money.

The Justice of Minas Gerais issued the arrest warrant for the teenager who gave testimony on July 6, 2010, and the preventive detention of Bruno and seven other people on July 7. The Justice of Rio de Janeiro had also issued the preventive detention of Bruno and Luiz Henrique Ferreira Romão, known as Macarrão, for Samudio's kidnapping and false imprisonment in October 2009. Bruno and Macarrão surrendered to the police in Rio de Janeiro and were taken to Polinter do Andaraí, where they were transferred to the Complexo Gericinó Penitentiary in Bangu. The 38th Criminal Court of Rio complied with the request of the Minas Gerais Police and ordered the transfer of both to Minas Gerais.

== Trial ==
The trial of Bruno, Macarrão, Marcos Aparecido dos Santos, Dayanne Rodrigues do Carmo Souza, Fernanda Gomes de Castro, Elenilson Vitor da Silva and Wemerson Marques de Souza, accused of various crimes, began in Contagem, Minas Gerais, on November 19, 2012, more than two years after Samudio's disappearance. Marixa Fabiane Lopes Rodrigues was the judge. The case went to popular jury, composed of six women and one man, selected from the 25 people called initially. The prosecution and attorneys for each defendant were able to turn away three jurors. The prosecutor in the case was Henry Wagner Vasconcelos de Castro. Among the defense lawyers on the first day of the trial were Rui Caldas Pimenta for Bruno, Franscisco Simim for Dayanne and Bruno, Fernando Magalhaes, Zanone Oliveira Jr., and Ércio Quaresma for Marcos dos Santos, Leonardo Diniz for Luiz Romão, Carla Cilene for Fernanda, Frederico Franco for Elenilson, and Paulo Sávio Cunha Gimarães for Wemerson.

Before the start of the trial, the judge established that no seat in the audience would be offered to people from the Contagem region, and that they would be reserved for relatives of those involved in the case, journalists, and law students. The trial was also not broadcast live.

On the first day, there was disagreement between defense lawyers for Marcos Aparecido dos Santos and the judge. They questioned some defense deadlines established by the same and abandoned the trial. The defendant refused the appointment of a public defender and ended up dismembering his trial. Ércio Quaresma, one of Marcos dos Santos' lawyers, stated that he would not work in a trial where "the defense is curtailed".

On the second day, Bruno asked for the dismissal of his defense lawyers, Rui Pimenta and Francisco Simim. Judge Marixa Fabiane Rodrigues denied the request, stating that she saw it as "a ploy to postpone the judgment", as the goalkeeper had previously asked for Francisco Simim's dismissal. After the fact, the trial proceeded with the prosecution's witnesses.

On the third day, judge Marixa Fabiana decided to postpone Bruno's trial to March 2013. According to her, the postponement was requested by the goalkeeper's defense. The jury continued for Macarrão and Fernanda Gomes de Castro (the goalkeeper's ex-girlfriend), the other two defendants in the case.

In the end, Macarrão was sentenced to 15 years in prison for his role in the kidnapping and murder of Eliza Samudio. On 8 March 2013, Bruno was sentenced to a 22-year jail term for the assault, torture and murder of Samudio.

=== Flamengo ===
The 1st Family Court of Barra da Tijuca also decided that the Flamengo club should pay child support by depositing, on the 5th of each month, 17.5% of the amount received by Bruno in addition to any labor sums to which the athlete is entitled. The club, in turn, said that it would not be possible to respect such terms because Bruno's contract had been suspended and he was no longer drawing a salary. Flamengo appealed the decision.

== See also ==
- List of kidnappings
- List of solved missing person cases (post-2000)
