= HMS Belleisle (1876) =

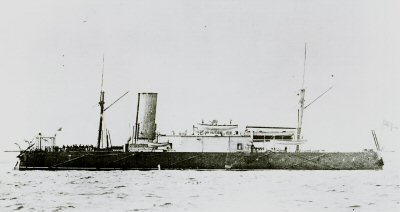

History

United Kingdom
- Name: HMS Belleisle
- Builder: Samuda Brothers, Cubitt Town, London
- Laid down: 1874
- Launched: 12 February 1876
- Completed: 19 July 1878
- Fate: Broken up 1904

General characteristics
- Class & type: Belleisle-class ironclad
- Displacement: 4,870 tons
- Length: 245 ft (75 m) p/p
- Beam: 52 ft (16 m)
- Draught: 21 ft (6.4 m)
- Propulsion: Two-shaft Maudslay horizontal; 4,040 ihp (3,010 kW)
- Sail plan: Square rig on foremast, gaff on mizzen
- Speed: 12.1 kn (22.4 km/h)
- Complement: 249
- Armament: 4 × 12-inch (305 mm) muzzle-loading rifles; 4 × 20-pounder breech-loaders; 2 × torpedo carriages
- Armour: Belt: 6 in (150 mm)–12 in (300 mm); Battery: 8 in (200 mm)–10 in (250 mm); Bulkheads: 5 in (130 mm)–9 in (230 mm); Conning tower: 9 in (230 mm); Decks: 1 in (25 mm)–3 in (76 mm)

HMS Belleisle was one of the four ships that were under construction for foreign navies in British shipyards which were purchased by the British government for the Royal Navy in 1878, at the time of the Russian war scare.

She was one of the two ironclads of the Belleisle class, the other being HMS Orion. She was built in the Samuda Brothers shipyard at Cubitt Town, London, for service with the Ottoman Navy, under the name of Peik-i-Sheref, and was taken over for the Royal Navy in a completed condition. She was, however, not regarded as fit to serve as a British warship until a number of extensive and expensive modifications were carried out.

== Design ==
She had been intended to carry 10-inch calibre guns, and the first recorded change is "enlargement of ports to take 25-ton guns" (i.e. guns of 12-inch calibre). Other major alterations included the building in of extra coal bunkers, the fitting of extra officers' cabins and the fitting of torpedo launching apparatus.

The main artillery was disposed in a centrally placed octagonal box battery with two guns on each beam. The firing ports were so arranged that it was possible to fire two guns ahead, astern and on a limited bearing on either side. There were limited areas afore and abaft the beam where only one gun could be brought to bear; as the primary armament of this ship, as devised and designed, was her ram, this was regarded by her designer as an acceptable limitation.

Being smaller than other contemporary British battleships, she and her sister HMS Orion had comparatively limited range, speed and armament. However they were initially welcomed by the naval press as being inexpensive, costing only half that of an Audacious-class battleship and a third of HMS Inflexible, but once her drawbacks became obvious they damned her in popular and naval opinion as a front-line fighting vessel.

== Service history ==
She was commissioned on 2 July 1878, and served for the next fourteen years as coastguard ship at Kingstown, Ireland. Her only activity there was firing practice four times a year, the annual squadron cruise, and one refit at Devonport. On 18 July 1886, she ran aground on the Pwllerochan Flat, in Milford Haven harbour. She was refloated later that day.

She paid off into the "B" Reserve in April 1893, descending into the Fleet Reserve in May 1894. She was paid off in May 1900 and converted into a target ship.

After surviving gunfire from HMS Majestic in which shells filled with lyddite were tested, she was towed back to Portsmouth. There, she was used to test the effect of guns of 6-inch and of 9.2 inch calibre, and of torpedoes. The torpedo experiments were expected to demonstrate the protective effect of cellulose against these weapons; the cellulose was expected to swell and plug the holes caused by the torpedoes. This did not happen, and Belleisle sank into the mud. She was raised with difficulty in October 1903 and sold for scrap to Germany.
