= Bruninho Samudio =

Brazilian footballer (born 2010)

Bruno Samudio
Personal information
- Full name: Bruno Samudio de Souza
- Date of birth: 10 February 2010 (age 16)
- Place of birth: São Paulo, Brazil
- Height: 1.95 m (6 ft 5 in)
- Position: Goalkeeper

Team information
- Current team: Botafogo

Youth career
- 2023–2024: Athletico Paranaense
- 2024–: Botafogo

International career
Years	Team	Apps	(Gls)
2025	Brazil U15		

Bruno Samudio de Souza (born 10 February 2010), commonly known as Bruninho Samudio, is a Brazilian professional footballer who plays as a goalkeeper for Botafogo. He is the son of Eliza Samudio, whose story became widely known in Brazil. Later, he developed an interest in football during his childhood and pursued a career as a goalkeeper.

== Personal life ==
Following the murder of his mother, Eliza Samudio, Bruninho was raised by his grandparents, Sônia Fátima Moura and Hernane Moura, in Campo Grande, Mato Grosso do Sul. Throughout his childhood and adolescence, he was cared for by his maternal family, who became his primary support system.

Years later, Bruninho sought answers about his mother's disappearance and the whereabouts of her remains. In 2026, he agreed to a meeting with his father, Bruno Fernandes, hoping to learn what had happened to Eliza's body so that her remains could be located and given a dignified burial. However, the meeting did not provide the answers he was seeking, and the location of Eliza's remains remained unknown.

== Club career ==
Bruninho began his career as a player playing futsal in Campo Grande, being promoted to field football in 2020. In 2023 he was admitted to the under-13 team of Athletico Paranaense, but was waived in the following year. He arrived at Botafogo in 2024 and in February 2026, signed his first professional contract with the club.

== International career ==
Samudio was called up to the Brazil under-15 team to compete in the CONMEBOL Evolución League and was one of the standout players in the competition, especially in the final match where he saved a penalty against Argentina.

== Honours ==
Brazil U15

- CONMEBOL Boys' U-15 Evolution League: 2025
