= Royal Edward (1864 ship) =

Iron hull sailing ship

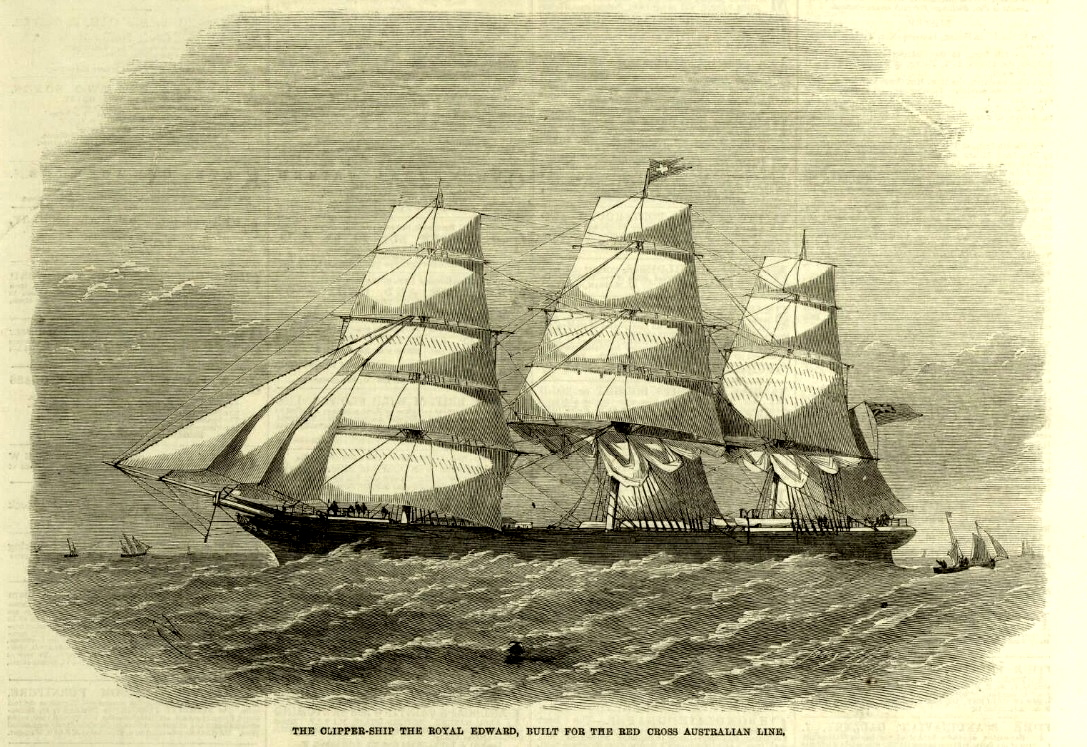
- Clipper Royal Edward of Red Cross Line

History

United Kingdom
- Name: Royal Edward
- Owner: H Fernie & Sons
- Operator: Red Cross Line
- Port of registry: Liverpool
- Builder: Westwood, Baillie and Co., London Yard Ironworks, Isle of Dogs, London
- Launched: 1864
- Fate: Abandoned in a sinking state on 3 July 1886

General characteristics
- Class & type: Clipper
- Tonnage: 1,508 GRT
- Tons burthen: 3500 (bm)
- Length: 223 ft 5 in (68.10 m) (Hull)
- Beam: 36 ft 8 in (11.18 m)
- Depth: 24 ft 0 in (7.32 m)
- Complement: 25

Royal Edward was an iron-hulled full-rigged ship, launched in March 1864 by Westwood, Baillie & Company at their London Yard ironworks. She was 223.5 ft (68.1 m) long, with a beam of 36.8 ft (11.2 m), and a depth of 24 ft (7.3 m).

The ship's maiden voyage was from England to Australia, sailing from London in May 1864, and arriving at Sydney on 2 September. She returned to London with a large cargo of over 4200 bales of wool as well as tallow, gum, copper ore, hides and horns. For over twenty years she was owned by Fernie Brothers of Liverpool and sailed as a packet between England and Australia for their Red Cross Australia Line as well as on other routes.

== Final voyage ==
Captain Robert S. M'Cleave sailed Royal Edward from Sharpness on 20 April 1886 with a full cargo of bagged salt for Melbourne. She was first damaged by heavy gales in the South Atlantic at 29°S 18°E, which destroyed two boats, swept away all loose deck fittings and severely strained the vessel, causing leaks and water ingress from the deck. Periodic pumping was then required to continue. When she was at 40°S 27°E around 30 June she encountered a hurricane force gale that severely damaged her, washing away the cabin. She also took on more water and the leaks increased. After three days of pumping the crew was exhausted when fortuitously the Norwegian barque Bellona came up and at great risk on 3 July rescued the crew, whom she delivered to Sydney on 12 August. When Royal Edward was abandoned she was in a sinking state.

A subsequent formal inquiry found that Royal Edward had been sound when she left England, and not overloaded. It clearly exonerated the master for the decision to abandon her.
