= Jacob Samuda =

Jacob Samuda (24 August 1811 – 12 November 1844) was an English civil engineer born in London. He is described as "the first Jewish engineer" on his tombstone, in the Sephardic cemetery, Mile End, London. He was the elder son of Abraham Samuda, an East and West India merchant of London, and Joy, daughter of H. d'Aguilar of Enfield Chase, Middlesex. Jacob's cousin married Hanna Ricardo, the sister of David Ricardo, the economist. After his apprenticeship with John Hague, an engineer, Jacob went into partnership with his brother Joseph d'Aguilar Samuda setting up the firm Samuda Brothers, a major London shipbuilder in the mid to late 19th century.

Jacob was an ingenious inventor and made a number of important discoveries. One of these, the atmospheric railway, received at first with considerable opposition, was subsequently adopted as a means of transit by several important companies, the first being Dublin and Kingstown Railway in 1842. Sir Robert Peel later recommended its adoption to the House of Commons and the Board of Trade. The first line to use it in England was from Epsom to London; and later the South Devon Railway adopted the principle of the new invention.

Jacob also made significant improvements in marine engines. In 1843, he contracted to build the Gypsy Queen, an iron boat to be fitted with his improved engine. On the trial trip, the ship exploded and he met his death along with six other persons.

The Samuda Estate, on the site of his shipyard in Cubitt Town, is named after him and his brother.

Samuda is buried in the Sephardic Burial Ground in the Mile End Road.
