= Samuda Estate =

Housing estate in Cubitt Town, London

Coordinates: 51°29′50″N 0°0′32″W

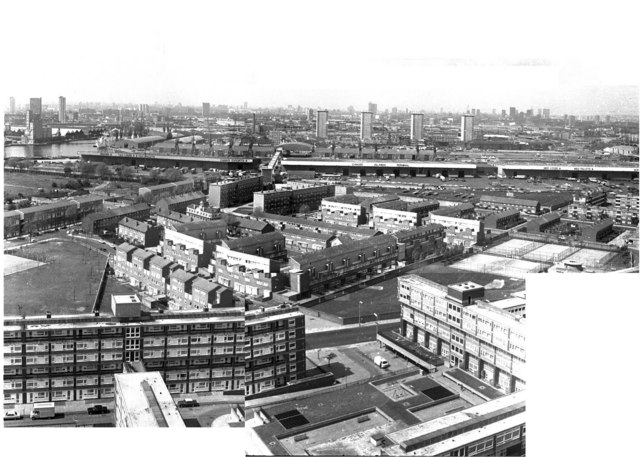
- Millwall Panorama, 1974, Composite photograph by Peter Land taken from the top of Kelson House, 1974 (Samuda Estate was within the boundary of Millwall at that time)
- Interactive map of Samuda Estate

General information
- Location: Cubitt Town
- Status: built
- Area: 4.6 ha (11 acres)
- No. of units: 550

Construction
- Constructed: 1967
- Architect: Gordon Tait
- Contractors: Tersons Ltd
- Authority: London County Council
- Style: Brutalism
- Influence: Le Corbusier

The Samuda Estate is on the east side of Manchester Road, in Cubitt Town on the Isle of Dogs. With 505 dwellings it is home to about 1,500 people and covers 11.4 acres (4.6 ha).

== Historical background ==
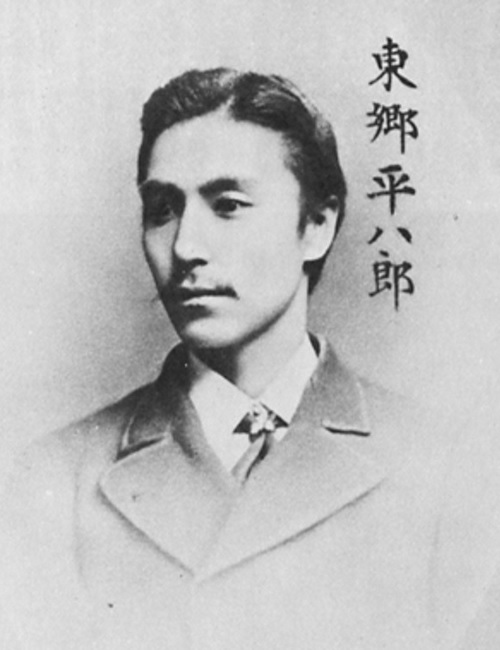
Tōgō at the time of his internship with the Samuda Brothers, 1877

The estate is named for the shipbuilding company of the Samuda Brothers, Jacob and Joseph d'Aguilar Samuda, who formerly occupied the site. Admiral Togo did his work experience here in 1877 working on the construction of the Fusō.

The estate was designed by Gordon Tait of the Worshipful Company of Masons, and built by Tersons Ltd for the London County Council in two phases, commencing in 1965. Work was completed by the Greater London Council and the estate subsequently became part of the Tower Hamlets council housing stock. Upon completion in 1967, the total cost of construction was £2,879,424 – including the cost of rebuilding the river wall, and the removal of massive concrete foundations on the former ship yard.

== Composition ==
The estate comprises four and six-storey blocks arranged around central traffic-free squares, some connected by covered bridges:

- Ballin Court, named after Louise Sakina Ballin wife of Joseph d'Aguilar Samuda
- Yarrow House, named after Alfred Fernandez Yarrow (1842–1932), an engineer who set up Folly Shipyard
- Pinnace House
- Reef House
- Hedley House, named after Joseph Hedley, one time partner of Alfred Yarrow
- Talia House
- Halyard House
- Dagmar Court
- Kelson House, by the riverside, is a 25–storey tower of interlocking maisonettes, arranged on three levels in a fashion derived from Le Corbusier's Unité d'Habitation (1947–52).

As a concession to the changing needs of its inhabitants resulting from the increase in car-ownership, the development included an underground parking area composed of 200 garages along with space for motorcycles. In 2004 the Samuda Estate Local Management Organisation distributed a paper calling for the refurbishment of the derelict underground garages as potential business units, with a multi-faith prayer facility, Tower Hamlets Community Recycling Consortium, and a workshop area for Local Labour in Construction.

The LDDC built the Samuda Community Centre for the estate in 1986, at a cost of £350,000.

== Contemporary culture ==
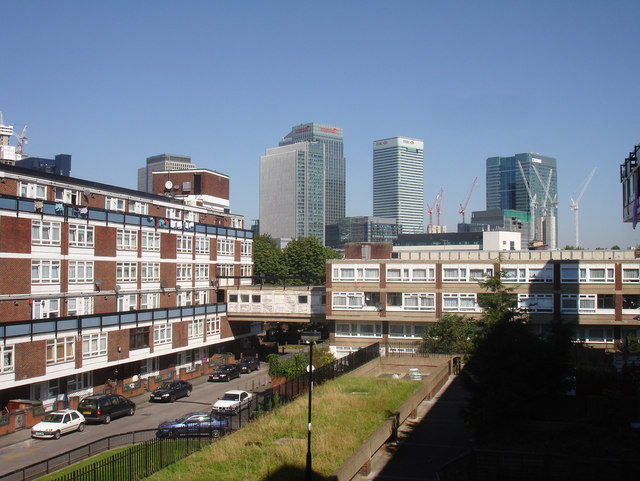
Pinnace House and Yarrow House with skyscrapers, 2007

=== Photography ===
- John Gay, the German architectural photographer, visited the estate shortly after it was built. 96 photographs he took of the Samuda Estate have been included in the English Heritage Archive.

Jonathan B50 visited Kelson House in 1973, and has published 7 photographs taken from the top of Kelson House as part of his Sunset – Moon – Sunrise series.

=== Literature ===
- The Samuda Estate was used as the setting for Defiant Pose, a novel by Stewart Home.

=== Visual arts ===
- Graffiti: the SELMO participated in the Greater London Authority's investigation into graffiti, explaining that graffiti was not seen as a major problem for the estate, appearing mainly in the communal stairwells. Caretakers were usually able to remove it quickly. When it presented problems, SELMO used specialist services to remove it. In light of far more pressing problems on the estate SELMO had worried about looking into alternative ways of dealing with graffiti.

=== Film and TV ===
- The innovative You Have Been Watched (Media Arts Project, 2002) was filmed in one day on the estate using CCTV cameras. See some images here. This involved a high level of resident involvement, which was reflected in the narrative structure which involved the local Community television station having its data hijacked by another organisation. When this becomes generally known, the residents organise a protest which leads to the public mock execution of the ones responsible. The film has been subject to critical attention in transgender studies.
- It has also been used as a location for a number of films and TV Dramas, including Dirty Pretty Things, England Expects, Top Boy, The Face and Red Light Runners an uncompleted film scheduled to star Harvey Keitel.
- The Kelson house and neighbourhood act in Lange Videclip You Take My Breath Away, created in 2000 by Lange (musician) under name SuReal.

Netflix series, Top Boy was filmed on the Samuda Estate under the fictional name "Summerhouse Estate".

== Privatisation ==
In 2005 the Samuda Estate was privatised as part of the Tower Hamlets London Borough Council's Housing Choice programme. A new Housing Association Toynbee Island Homes was established on a resident-led basis. However, in 2007, This was taken over by One Housing Group in 2007. In April, 2008 the local housing office was the site of a dramatic sit-in by a board member of the Samuda Estate Local Management Organisation following their eviction from the 'Samuda Housing Office which they occupied since 2005. This coincided with the firing of the resident Board members of Island Homes by the One Housing Group Chief Executive Officer Mick Sweeney. Quoting a report from Campbell Tickell, Sweeney admitted they were guilty of "persistent serious failures in their duties to properly govern the association".

- Barkantine Management Team, who had been fired from the Island Homes Board responded that residents were being treated with disrespect: "It is a question of professionals blaming the amateurs".
- In a statement made in the occupied Samuda Office, the view was aired that "management does not like effective participation and would only like to play lip service to it.
- Another SELMO spokesperson suggested that One Housing Group were "flexing their muscles".

In what The Wharf newspaper described as a "war of words", a spokesperson for One Housing Group argued that the action taken was "essential in protecting the interests of residents":

"OHG will continue to support Island Homes and an interim board will be appointed to take such steps as are required to ensure that services to Island Homes residents are first class, and to ensure the promises made to residents in relation to the improvement works to their homes are delivered."
