= Samuda Brothers =

- Industry: Engineering; Shipbuilding
- Founded: 1843
- Founders: Jacob Samuda; Joseph d'Aguilar Samuda
- Defunct: 1890s
- Headquarters: Cubitt Town, Isle of Dogs, London, England

Samuda Brothers was an engineering and ship building firm at Cubitt Town on the Isle of Dogs in London, England founded by Jacob and Joseph d'Aguilar Samuda. The site is now occupied by Samuda Estate.

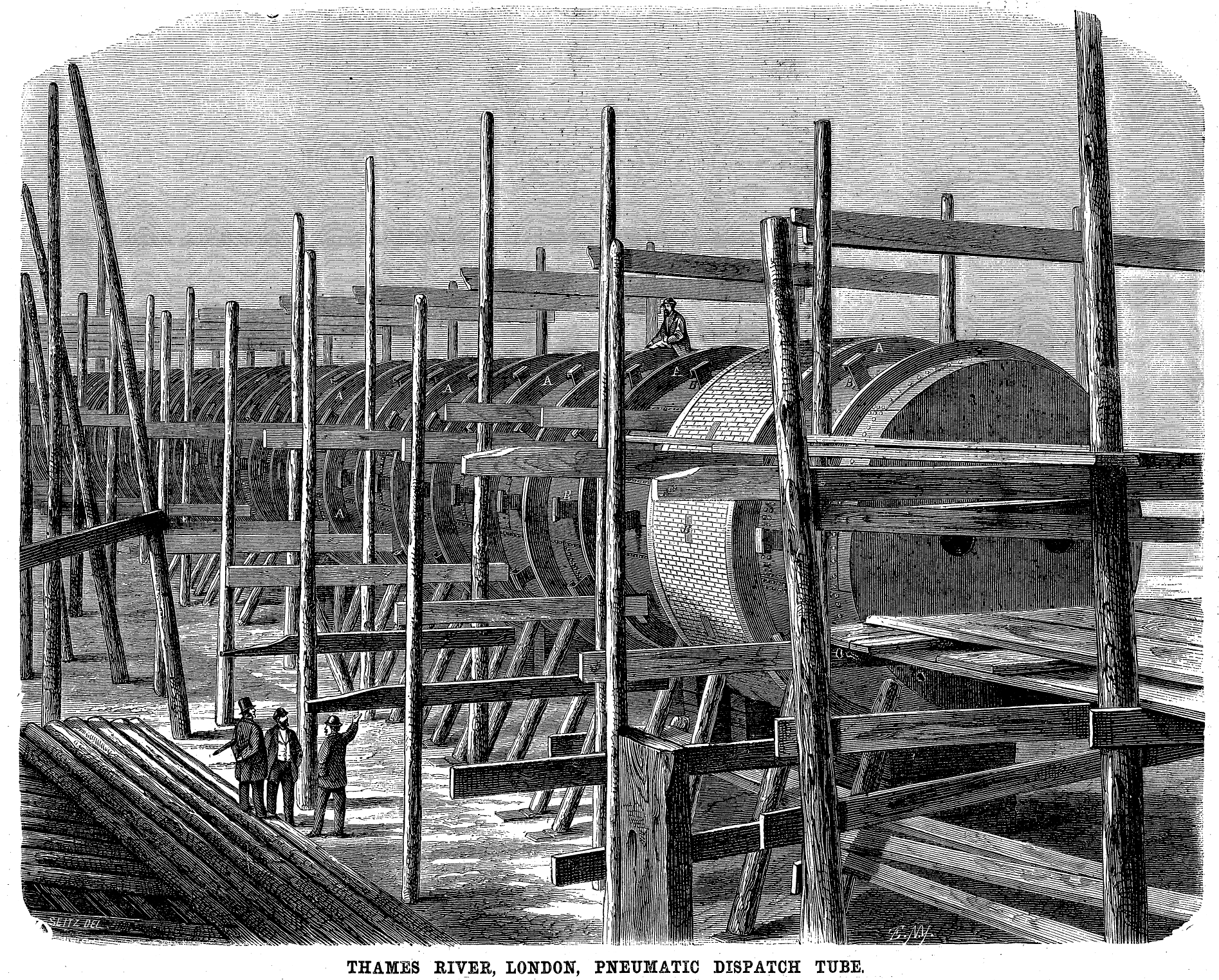
An iron tube for the Waterloo & Whitehall Railway

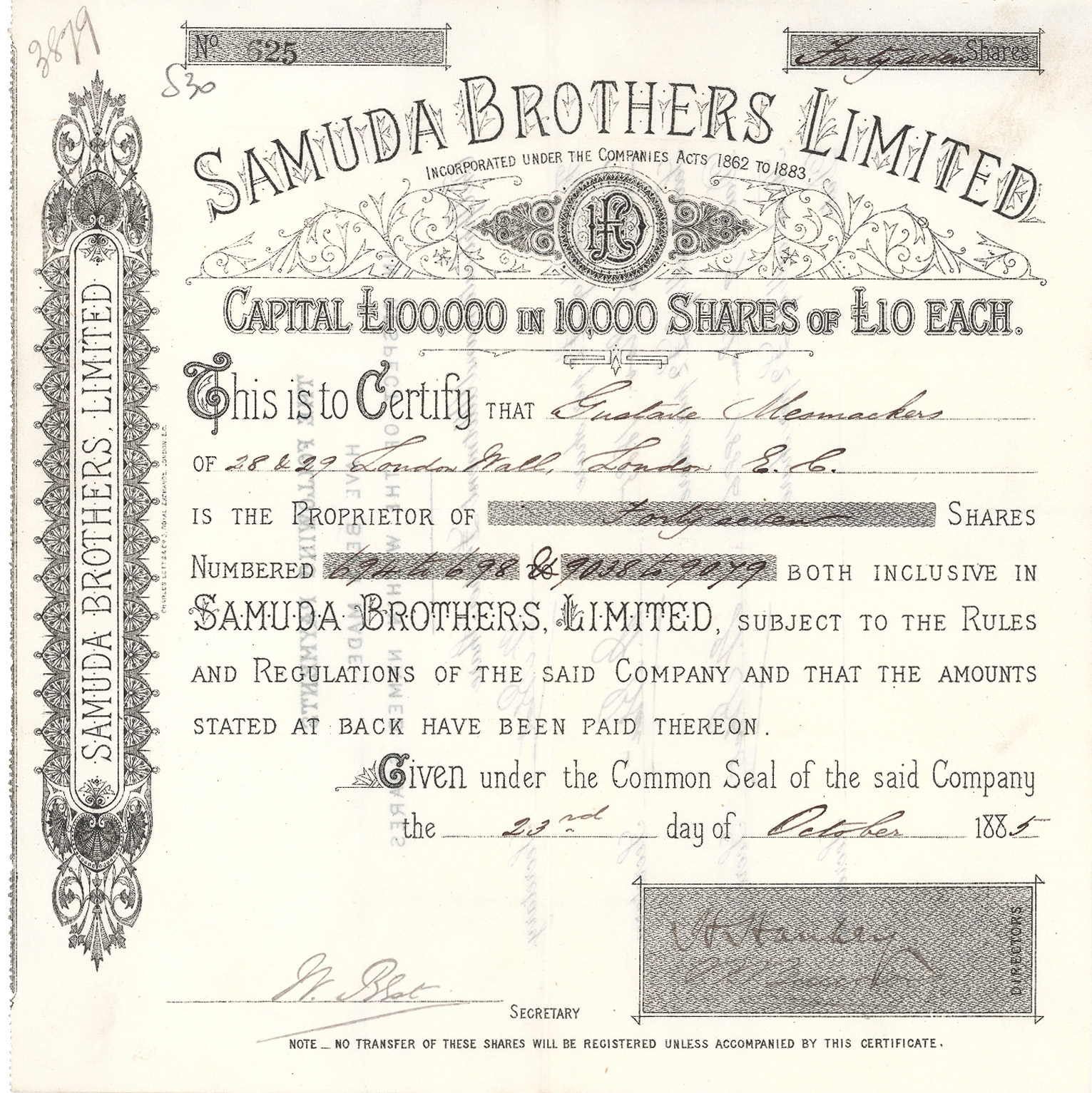
Share of the Samuda Brothers Ltd., issued 23. October 1885

Samuda Brothers initially leased a premises on the Goodluck Hope Peninsula, Leamouth, London, in 1843, by the mouth of Bow Creek. Disaster struck with one of their first ships, the Gipsy Queen which exploded on its test trip in November 1844. Jacob was killed with nine of the firm's employees. There was a further explosion at their shipyard in 1845 and another three workers were killed.

The firm moved to Cubitt Town in 1852, having outgrown a site that was hemmed in by other industrial premises. By this time the company was run by Joseph, Jacob having been killed in the trial of the Gipsy Queen. The Cubitt Town yard specialised in iron and steel warships and steam packets and by 1863 was said to be producing double the output of the other London shipyards combined.

Samuda fabricated components for the Waterloo & Whitehall Railway, an atmospheric railway system. The project was abandoned due to the 1866 financial crisis. Orders from Germany, Russia and Japan enabled the firm to survive the crisis, which affected many other London yards.

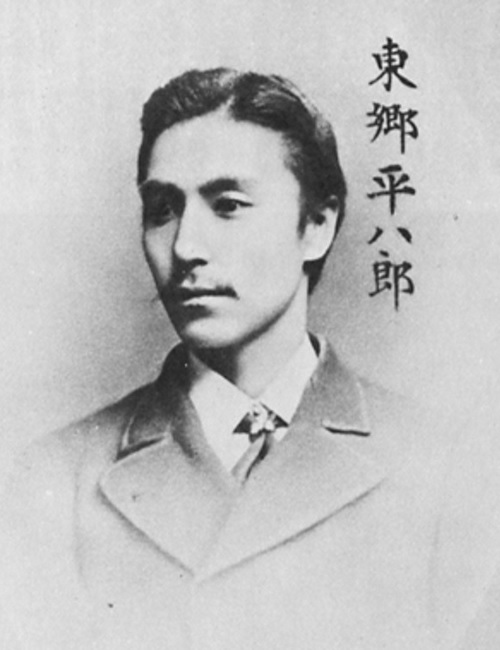
Togo at the time of his work experience with Samuda in 1877

In 1877 Togo Heihachiro, later a prominent Japanese admiral, came for work experience with the Samuda Brothers after completing his training at the Naval Preparatory School in Portsmouth, and the Royal Naval College at Greenwich. He supervised the construction of the Fusō before returning to Japan. He led the Imperial Japanese navy to victory in the Russo-Japanese War, establishing Japan as a Great Power.

Following the death of Joseph in 1885 attempts were made to sell the firm as a going concern. This was unsuccessful, resulting in closure in the 1890s, leaving Yarrows and Thames Ironworks as the last significant London shipbuilders.

== Ships built by the Samuda Brothers ==
- SS Carnatic, P&O, 1862
- HMS Tamar, Royal Navy, 1863
- BAP Independencia, Peruvian Navy, 1864
- Mahroussa, Khedive of Egypt, 1865
- Bordein, Khedive of Egypt, Nile steamer c 1865
- SMS Kronprinz, Prussian Navy, 1867
- Muin-i Zafer, Ottoman Navy, 1869
- SMS Kaiser, German Navy 1874
- SMS Deutschland, German Navy 1875
- Fusō, Imperial Japanese Navy, 1877
- HMS Belleisle, Royal Navy 1876 (originally to be Peyk-i Şeref for Ottoman Empire)
- HMS Orion, Royal Navy 1879 (originally to be Büruç-u Zafer for Turkish Navy)
- ARA Almirante Brown, Argentine Navy, 1880
- Riachuelo, Brazilian Navy, 1883
- HMS Sappho, Royal Navy, 1891
- PS Myleta (1891), a paddle steamer with a two-cylinder single oscillating engine. Built for the South Eastern Railway, and scrapped in 1909

== See also ==
- South Devon Railway engine houses
