= List of ship launches in 1871 =

The list of ship launches in 1871 includes a chronological list of some ships launched in 1871.

Date	Ship	Class / type	Builder	Location	Country	Notes
7 January	Bustard	Ant-class gunboat	Messrs. Robert Napier & Sons	Govan	United Kingdom	For Royal Navy.
7 January	Cleadon	Steamship	William Watson	Sunderland	United Kingdom	For H. T. Morton & Co.
9 January	Alps	Steamship		Kirkcaldy	United Kingdom	For Glasgow and South American Steam Navigation Company.
19 January	City of Ghent	Steamship	Thomas Charlton	Grimsby	United Kingdom	For private owner.
21 January	Tagus	Steamship	Messrs. John Elder & Co.	Govan	United Kingdom	For Royal Mail Steam Packet Company.
23 January	Marmion	Steamship	J. G. Lawrie	Whiteinch	United Kingdom	For private owner.
24 January	Calliope	Steamship	Messrs. Humprhys & Pearson	Hull	United Kingdom	For Messrs. Hornstedt & Garthorne.
24 January	Glensannox	Steamship	Messrs. Alexander Stephen & Sons	Linthouse	United Kingdom	For Messrs. William Ross & Co.
24 January	Strathclyde	Steamship	Messrs. Blackwood & Gordon	Port Glasgow	United Kingdom	For Messrs. Burrell & M'Laren.
25 January	Virago	Steamship	Messrs. C. & W. Earle	Hull	United Kingdom	For Messrs. Wilson, Sons, & Co.
January	Assyria	Steamship	Messrs. Robert Duncan & Co.	Port Glasgow	United Kingdom	For Messrs. Handyside & Henderson.
January	Gothland	Steamship	J. & G. Thomson	Govan	United Kingdom	For Messrs. James Currie & Co.
January	Juan Ferrin	Barque	Messrs. John Reid & Co.	Port Glasgow	United Kingdom	For Messrs. John Clapperton & Co.
January	Lady Evelyn	Schooner	W. Fyfe	Fairlie	United Kingdom	For Marquess of Ailsa.
January	Princess Louise	Steam yacht	Messrs. Blackwood & Gordon	Port Glasgow	United Kingdom	For John Laurence Stewart.
January	Unity	Schooner	John Banks	Kilpin Pike	United Kingdom	For John Banks.
2 February	Serpent	Wheeled aviso	Ernest Gouin et Cie.	Nantes	France	For French Navy
4 February	Canopus	East Indiaman	Messrs. W. Simons & Co.	Renfrew	United Kingdom	For private owner.
7 February	Aquila	Steamship	James Laing	Sunderland	United Kingdom	For J. Laing, H. Mackenzie and G. Porteous.
7 February	Cecil Brindley	Schooner	Thomas Roberts	Penhelig	United Kingdom	For J. Lewis.
7 February	Khedive	Steamship	Messrs. Caird & Co.	Greenock	United Kingdom	For Peninsular and Oriental Steam Navigation Company.
8 February	Kite	Ant-class gunboat	Messrs. Robert Napier & Sons	Govan	United Kingdom	For Royal Navy.
10 February	Taboguilla	Steamship	Messrs. Bowdler, Chaffer & Co.	Seacombe	United Kingdom	For Pacific Steam Navigation Company.
11 February	Egypt	Steamship	Liverpool Shipbuilding Company	Liverpool	United Kingdom	For National Steamship Company. Collided with HMS Clarence on being launched.
16 February	No. 32	Mooring lighter		Devonport Dockyard	United Kingdom	For Royal Navy.
17 February	Vigilant	Helicon-class despatch vessel		Devonport Dockyard	United Kingdom	For Royal Navy.
20 February	Indus	Steamship	Messrs. William Denny & Bros.	Dumbarton	United Kingdom	For Peninsular and Oriental Steam Navigation Company.
21 February	Argo	Steamship	London and Glasgow Engineering and Steamship Building Company	Glasgow	United Kingdom	For Bristol Steam Navigation Company.
21 February	George Avery	Fishing trawler	John Barter	Brixham	United Kingdom	For John Dugdall and others.
22 February	Hercules	Paddle tug	John Batchelor, or Batchelor Bros.	Cardiff	United Kingdom	For Philip Morel and others.
22 February	Iceland	Steamship	Messrs. J. & G. Thomson	Govan	United Kingdom	For Messrs. James Currie & Co.
February	Emerald	Steamship	British Timber Company (Limited)	Galway	United Kingdom	For British Timber Company (Limited).
4 March	Gallatin	Gallatin-class cutter	David Bell Company	Buffalo, New York	United States	For United States Revenue Cutter Service.
6 March	Daring	Yacht	Michael Ratsey	Cowes	United Kingdom	For John Harvey.
6 March	The Lady Carmichael	Paddle steamer	A. McMillan & Son	Dumbrton	United Kingdom	For Submarine Telegraph Company.
7 March	Joseph Dodds	Steamship	Messrs. Richardson, Duck & Co.	Stockton-on-Tees	United Kingdom	For Messrs. R. Byrne & Co.
7 March	Lady Carmichael	Paddle steamer	Messrs. A. M'Millan & Son	Dumbarton	United Kingdom	For Submarine Telegraph Company.
7 March	Sarmatian	Steamship	Messrs. Robert Steele & Co.	Greenock	United Kingdom	For Messrs. Allan.
8 March	Baltic	Ocean liner	Harland and Wolff	Belfast	United Kingdom	For White Star Line.
8 March	Glatton	Breastwork monitor		Chatham Dockyard	United Kingdom	For Royal Navy.
8 March	Willem III	Willem III-class steamship	John Elder & Co.	Govan	United Kingdom	For Stoomvaart Maatschappij Nederland.
9 March	Woodlark	Plover-class gunvessel		Chatham Dockyard	United Kingdom	For Royal Navy.
11 March	Duna	Steamship	Messrs. Aitken & Mansel	Whiteinch	United Kingdom	For private owners.
18 March	Albatross	Albatross-class gunboat	Kaiserliche Werft	Danzig	Germany	For Kaiserliche Marine.
21 March	Princess Louise	Steam launch	John Samuel White	East Cowes	United Kingdom	For private owner.
22 March	Abydos	Steamship	London and Glasgow Engineering and Shipbuilding Company (Limited)	Glasgow	United Kingdom	For private owners.
22 March	Ardee	Steamship	Messrs. Hall, Russell & Co.	Footdee	United Kingdom	For Messrs. J. B. Adam & Co.
22 March	Bouncer	Lighter	Messrs. Scott & MacGill	Bowling	United Kingdom	For Messrs. James Rankine & Son.
22 March	City of Mecca	Steamship	Messrs. Charles Connell & Co.	Kelvinhaugh	United Kingdom	For Messrs. George Smith & Sons.
22 March	Don Juan Prim	Steamship	Messrs. Archibald M'Millan & Son	Dumbarton	United Kingdom	For private owner.
23 March	David Burn	Steamship	William Doxford	Sunderland	United Kingdom	For Messrs. D. Burn, Robert Hindhaugh and partners.
23 March	Sun Foo	Steamship	Messrs. Alexander Stephen & Sons	Linthouse	United Kingdom	For private owner.
23 March	Washi	Steamship	Messrs. Bewley & Co.	Dublin	United Kingdom	For John Rossi Hooper.
24 March	Yorkshire Lass	Steamship	Messrs. T. B. Seath & Co.	Rutherglen	United Kingdom	For private owner.
25 March	Isphan	Steamship	Messrs. W. Simons & Co.	Renfrew	United Kingdom	For Messrs. Gray, Dawes & Co.
25 March	United Kingdom		Chatham Dockyard	Scourge	Ant-class gunboat	For Royal Navy.
25 March	Snake	Ant-class gunboat		Chatham Dockyard	United Kingdom	For Royal Navy.
27 March	King Orry	Steamship	R. Duncan & Co.	Port Glasgow	United Kingdom	For Isle of Man Steam Packet Company.
5 April	Coquette	Ariel-class gunboat		Pembroke Dockyard	United Kingdom	For Royal Navy.
6 April	Honduras	Steamship	Messrs. Thomas Royden & Sons	Liverpool	United Kingdom	For Panama Railroad Co.
6 April	Livonia	Yacht	Michael Ratsey	Cowes	United Kingdom	For James Lloyd Ashbury.
6 April	Militades	Clipper	Messrs. Walter Hood & Co.	Aberdeen	United Kingdom	For Aberdeen Clipper Line.
6 April	Zelina	Steamship	Messrs. Bowdler, Chaffer & Co.	Seacombe	United Kingdom	For Messrs. J. Glynn & Son.
8 April	Ptarmigan	Schooner		Cowes	United Kingdom	For J. W. Pawson.
10 April	Caprice	Schooner	Brown & Lovell	East Boston, Massachusetts	United States	For Eugene Sullivan & Peter McEnry.
12 April	Fairholm	Steamship	Messrs. A. & J. Inglis	Pointhouse	United Kingdom	For private owner.
18 April	Bivouac	Steamship	Messrs. Aitken & Mansel	Whiteinch	United Kingdom	For William Laing.
18 April	Lorne	Paddle steamer	Messrs. Archibald M'Millan & Son	Dumbarton	United Kingdom	For Mr. Stewart.
20 April	Brittany	Steamship	Messrs. Schlesinger, Davis & Co	Wallsend-on-Tyne	United Kingdom	For Messrs. Hacquoil Bros.
20 April	Daydream	Yawl	Ratsey	Cowes	United Kingdom	For Edward Loyd.
20 April	Iberia	Steamship	Messrs. Blackwood & Gordon	Port Glasgow	United Kingdom	For Messrs. Robert Henderson & Co.
20 April	Jaguarao	Steamship	Messrs. Henderson, Coulborn & Co.	Renfrew	United Kingdom	For local government of the Rio Grande do Sul.
20 April	Mavis	Steamship	Messrs. Withy & Alexander	Hartlepool	United Kingdom	For private owner.
20 April	Wellington	Paddle steamer	William Allsup	Preston	United Kingdom	For Mr. Bickerstaffe, or South Blackpool Jetty Co.
21 April	Patna	Steamship	Messrs. William Denny & Bros.	Dumbarton	United Kingdom	For British India Steam Navigation Company.
22 April	Ararat	Steamship	Liverpool Shipbuilding Company	Liverpool	United Kingdom	For Messrs. Papayanni Bros.
22 April	Clifford	Steamship	W. Pile	Sunderland	United Kingdom	For Dale & Crighton.
22 April	Garonne	Steamship	Messrs. R. Napier & Sons	Govan	United Kingdom	For Pacific Steam Navigation Company.
22 April	Mavourneen	Schooner	Messrs. Camper & Nicholson	Gosport	United Kingdom	For private owner.
22 April	Zembra	Steamship	Messrs. Bowdler, Chaffer, & Co.	Seacombe	United Kingdom	For Messrs. John Glynn & Co.
27 April	Robert Ingram	Steamship	Messrs. Readhead & Softly	South Shields	United Kingdom	For private owner.
April	Albay	Steamship	Messrs. Dobie & Co.	Govan	United Kingdom	For Messrs. Russell & Sturgis.
April	Anthony Strong	Steamship	W. Pile & Co	Sunderland	United Kingdom	For private ownber.
April	Bison	Steamship	Messrs. J. & G. Thomson	Govan	United Kingdom	For Messrs. G. & J. Burns.
April	Emily	Schooner	Messrs. J. & R. Swan	Port Glasgow	United Kingdom	For Alexander Miller, Brother, & Co.
April	Etna	Steamship	Messrs. Scott & Co	Greenock	United Kingdom	For private owner.
April	Garrion	Cutter yacht	Messrs. Steele	Greenock	United Kingdom	For Thomas Houldsworth.
April	Guarany	Steamship	Messrs. Johbn Fullerton & Co.	Paisley	United Kingdom	For private opwner.
April	Hugh Streatfield	Steamship	G. Short	Sunderland	United Kingdom	For J. S. Barwick & Co.
April	Lorne	Schooner	Lyon & Foster	Greenock	United Kingdom	For John M'Lachlan.
April	Mary Grace	Schooner	Irvine Shipbuilding Co.	Irvine	United Kingdom	For C. Wilson.
April	Oliveira	Paddle steamer		River Clyde	United Kingdom	For private owner.
April	Pallion	Steamship	T. R. Oswald	Sunderland	United Kingdom	For Childe & Co.
April	St. Olaf	Steamship	Messrs. J. Wigham Richardson & Co	Walker-on-Tyne	United Kingdom	For private owner.
April	Vandalia	Steamship	Messrs. Caird & Co.	Greenock	United Kingdom	For Hamburg-Amerikanische Packetfahrt-Actien-Gesellschaft.
4 May	Prins van Oranje	Willem III-class steamship	John Elder & Co.	Govan	United Kingdom	For Stoomvaart Maatschappij Nederland.
6 May	Mecca	Steamship	William Watson	Sunderland	United Kingdom	For Ralph M. Hudson Jr.
7 May	Sirex	Yawl	Bowdler, Chaffer & Co.	Seacombe	United Kingdom	For Sir H. H. Bacon.
8 May	Rose	Steamship	Robert Thompson	Sunderland	United Kingdom	For Messrs. G. Jinman & Co.
9 May	Spain	Steamship	Messrs. Laird Bros.	Birkenhead	United Kingdom	For National Steamship Company.
10 May	Columbia	Yacht	J. B. & J. D. Van Deusen	Chester, Pennsylvania	United States	For Franklin Osgood.
10 May	Gala	Steamship	Messrs. M'Cullock, Paterson & Co.	Port Glasgow	United Kingdom	For Berwick and London Steamship Co.
18 May	Clifton	Steamship	Allsup	Preston	United Kingdom	For Southport and Lytham Steam Packet Co.
18 May	Penguin	Steamship	Messrs. Barclay, Curle & Co.	Stobcross	United Kingdom	For Messrs. Seater, White & Co.
19 May	Elizabeth Ellen Fisher	Schooner	M'Lea	Rothesay	United Kingdom	For Thomas Fisher.
Unknown date	Rose of Devon	Fishing trawler	John Barter	Brixham	United Kingdom	For Solomon Gravels Jr. and others.
20 May	Bonetta	Ant-class gunboat	Messrs. J. & G. Rennie	Greenwich	United Kingdom	For Royal Navy.
20 May	Tinto	Steamship	Messrs. Bowdler, Chaffer & Co.	Seacombe	United Kingdom	For Messrs. Strong, Reid & Page.
22 May	Acacia	Fishing smack	Hunt	Aldeburgh	United Kingdom	For Messrs. Reed & Fletcher.
22 May	Agnes Edgell	Barquentine	Messrs. J. & W. Peters	Canons Marsh	United Kingdom	For R. F. Edgell.
22 May	Pantaloon	Yacht	Ratsey	Cowes	United Kingdom	For Colonel Markham.
23 May	Precursor	Dredger	Messrs. Thomas Wingate & Co.	Whiteinch	United Kingdom	For Messrs. Storry & Smith.
23 May	Wenvoe	Steamship	Messrs. Schlesinger, Davies & Co	Wallsend-on-Tyne	United Kingdom	For J. H. Wilson and partners.
24 May	Zampa	Cutter		River Clyde	United Kingdom	For Mr. Forrester.
31 May	Walamo	Steamshipa	Messrs. C. & W. Earle	Hull	United Kingdom	For Messrs. Thomas Wilson, Sons, & Co.
May	Abana	Steamship	James Laing	Sunderland	United Kingdom	For James Westoll & Co.
May	Aline	Yacht	Messrs. Camper & Nicholson	Gosport	United Kingdom	For private owner.
May	Amy	Steam yacht	Messrs. T. B. Seath & Co.	Rutherglen	United Kingdom	For N. B. Stewart.
May	Azalea	Steamship	Messrs. Dobie & Co.	Govan	United Kingdom	For Messrs. Hargrove, Ferguson & Jackson.
May	Dagupan	Steamship	Messrs. Alexander Stephen & Sons	Linthouse	United Kingdom	For private owner.
May	Electric Spark	Steam yacht	M'Bryde	Greenock	United Kingdom	For private owner.
May	Enchantress	Schooner	Samuel H. Pine	Greenpoint, New York	United States	For Joseph Florimond Loubat.
May	Heather Bell	Paddle steamer	Messrs. Blackwood & Gordon	Port Glasgow	United Kingdom	For Duke of Hamilton.
May	Leander	Cutter	Messrs. John Reid & Co.	Port Glasgow	United Kingdom	For James Reid.
May	Louise of Lorne	Steamship	Messrs. J. & R. Swan	Dumbarton	United Kingdom	For private owner.
May	Mirzapore	Steamship	Messrs. Caird & Co.	Greenock	United Kingdom	For Peninsular and Oriental Steam Navigation Company.
May	Moselle	Steamship	Messrs. John Elder & Co.	Govan	United Kingdom	For Royal Mail Steam Packet Company.
May	Norma	Cutter	John M'Quistin	Largs	United Kingdom	For J. T. Stewart.
May	Saga	Steamship	Messrs. Aitken & Mansel	Whiteinch	United Kingdom	For Messrs. J. T. Salvesen & Co.
2 June	Sunniside	Steamship	William Watson	Sunderland	United Kingdom	For Robert Todd Nicholson and others.
3 June	Gustaf	Steamship	Messrs. Archibald M'Millan & Son	Dumbarton	United Kingdom	For Messrs. Gustaf, Lindberg & Co.
3 June	W. R. Rickett	Steamship	T. R. Oswald	Sunderland	United Kingdom	For J. Marychurch & Co.
6 June	Zuleika	Schooner	Nicholson	Gosport	United Kingdom	For private owner.
8 June	City of London	Steamship	Messrs. John Elder & Co.	Govan	United Kingdom	For Aberdeen and London Steam Navigation Co.
13 May	Belle	Brigantine	William Allsup	Preston	United Kingdom	For Walton & Co.
15 June	Mari V	Steamship	Messrs. T. B. Seath & Co.	Rutherglen	United Kingdom	For private owner.
17 June	St. Nicholas	Steamship	J. G. Lawrie	Whiteinch	United Kingdom	For Aberdeen, Leith and Clyde Steamship Co.
17 June	Warkworth Castle	Steamship	Messrs. W. Pile & Co.	Sunderland	United Kingdom	For Messrs. Laws, Cleugh & Co.
19 June	Mesopotamia	Steamship	Messrs. Henderson, Coulborn & Co.	Renfrew	United Kingdom	For Messrs. Lynch Bros.
20 June	Lord Athlumney	Paddle steamer	Messrs. A. & J. Inglis	Pointhouse	United Kingdom	For Drogheda Steam Packet Company.
21 June	Chimborazo	Steamship	Messrs. John Elder & Co.	Govan	United Kingdom	For Pacific Steam Navigation Company.
22 June	Agra	Steamship	Messrs. C. & W. Earle	Hull	United Kingdom	For private owner.
24 June	Gouvernor-Generaal Mijier	Steamship	Messrs. Charles Connell & Co	Scotstoun	United Kingdom	For "Netherlands India Steam Navigation Company (Limited)".
24 June	Tenasserim	Steamship	Messrs. William Denny & Bros.	Dumbarton	United Kingdom	For Messrs. P. Henderson & Co.
27 June	Sterlina	Steamship	Messrs. J. & R. Swan	Maryhill	United Kingdom	For James Sinclair.
June	Alpha	Schooner	Irvine Shipbuilding Co.	Irvine	United Kingdom	For private owner.
June	Alpha	Schooner	Messrs. A. & J. Inglis	Pointhouse	United Kingdom	For private owner.
June	Bladworth	Steamship	Messrs. Richardson, Duck & Co.	Stockton-on-Tees	United Kingdom	For Messrs. Brownlow, Lumsden & Co.
June	British Seaman	Barquentine	William Allsup	Preston	United Kingdom	For Allsup & Co.
June	Colmonell	Merchantman	Messrs. John Reid & Co.	Port Glasgow	United Kingdom	For Messrs. John Kerr & Co.
June	Killarney	Steamship	Messrs. A. M'Millan & Son	Dumbarton	United Kingdom	For Messrs. Francis Carvill & Son.
June	Lusitania	Steamship	Messrs. Laird Bros.	Birkenhead	United Kingdom	For Pacific Steam Navigation Company.
June	Patterdale	Steamship	Whitehaven Shipbuilding Company	Whitehaven	United Kingdom	For private owner.
1 July	Amelia	Steamship	Messrs. Bowdler, Chaffer & Co.	Seacombe	United Kingdom	For Messrs. Strong, Reid & Page.
3 July	Black Sea	Steamship	Joseph L. Thompson	North Sands	United Kingdom	For Blyth Steam Shipping Co.
3 July	Hare	Trawling smack	Messrs. John Wray & Sons	Burton Stather	United Kingdom	For J. Harding.
3 July	Harrier	Trawling smack	Messrs. John Wray & Sons	Burton Stather	United Kingdom	For J. Harding.
3 July	Perica	Barque	Messrs. Humphrey & Son.	Hull	United Kingdom	For Messrs. A. Pearson & Co.
4 July	Constance Ellen	Schooner	Mr. Martin	Porthcawl	United Kingdom	For private owner.
4 July	Fawn	Smack	Robertson	Ipswich	United Kingdom	For Mr. Neal.
4 July	Republic	Ocean liner	Harland and Wolff	Belfast	United Kingdom	For White Star Line.
6 July	Marquis of Lorne	Schooner	Messrs. P. Barclay & Son	Ardrossan	United Kingdom	For private owner.
12 July	Devastation	Devastation-class battleship	Portsmouth Dockyard	Portsmouth	United Kingdom	For Royal Navy.
17 July	Fop Smit	Steamship	William Watson	Sunderland	United Kingdom	For Willem Ruys en Zonen.
18 July	Cyclops	Cyclops-class monitor	Thames Ironworks and Shipbuilding Company	Leamouth	United Kingdom	For Royal Navy.
19 July	Syringa	Brigantine	Bowdler, Chaffer & Co.	Seacombe	United Kingdom	For Holden, Gann & Co.
20 July	Pekin	Steamship	Messrs. Caird & Co.	Greenock	United Kingdom	For Peninsular and Oriental Steam Navigation Company.
20 July	Viceroy	Steamship	Messrs. Green	Blackwall	United Kingdom	For Peninsular and Oriental Steam Navigation Company.
21 July	Ariadne	Ariadne-class corvette	Kaiserliche Werft	Danzig	Germany	For Kaiserliche Marine.
22 July	Aurora	Steamship	T. R. Oswald	Sunderland	United Kingdom	For Woldd & Haigh.
22 July	West	Steamship	Bowdler, Chaffer & Co.	Seacombe	United Kingdom	For Mersey Steam Ship Co. Ltd.
29 July	Para	Paddle steamer	Messrs. Stephen & Son	Govan	United Kingdom	For Brazilian Navigation Company.
29 July	Toivo	Frigate		Oulu	(Russian Empire) Grand Duchy of Finland	For Tradehouse J. W. Snellman.
31 July	Derzhava	Royal yacht	New Admiralty Shipyard	Saint Petersburg	Russia	For Alexander II.
July	Gem	Schooner	Joseph & Nicholas Butson	Bodinnick	United Kingdom	For private owner.
July	Royal Standard	Steamship	W. Pile & Co.	Sunderland	United Kingdom	For E. Shotton & Co.
2 August	Faithful	Steamship	Messrs. Dobie & Co.	Govan	United Kingdom	For Messrs. F. H. Powell & Co.
5 August	Bacchante	Schooner	Bowdler, Chaffer & Co.	Seacombe	United Kingdom	For F. W. Woodhouse.
5 August	Coajutor	Hopper barge	Messrs. Thomas Wingate & Co.	Whiteinch	United Kingdom	For Messrs. Storry & Smith.
5 August	Portador	Hopper barge	Messrs. Thomas Wingate & Co.	Whiteinch	United Kingdom	For Messrs. Storry & Smith.
5 August	Sedgemoor	Steamship	Messrs. Schlesinger, Davis & Co.	Wallsend	United Kingdom	For James Ware.
7 August	Gordon Castle	Steamship	Messrs. James & George Thomson	Govan	United Kingdom	For Castle Line.
8 August	Cumberland	Paddle steamer	Melancthan & Simpson	Port Robinson	Canada	For Toronto and Lake Superior Navigation Company.
14 August	Derby	Steamship	Messrs. Humphry & Pearson	Hull	United Kingdom	For Messrs. Bailey & Leetham.
16 August	Hematite	Steamship	Messrs. Dobie & Co.	Govan	United Kingdom	For Mr. W. Mason.
17 August	SS Benledi1871 (2)	Steamship	Messrs. Barclay, Curle & Co.	Prot Glasgow	United Kingdom	For Messrs. William Thompson & Co.
17 August	Hai Loong	Steamship	Messrs. Hall, Russell & Co.	Aberdeen	United Kingdom	For Messrs. James Morrison & Co.
17 August	Prins Hendrik	Willem III-class steamship	John Elder & Co.	Govan	United Kingdom	For Stoomvaart Maatschappij Nederland.
17 August	Scindia	Steamship	Messrs. T. R. Oswald & Co	Pallion	United Kingdom	For Messrs. C. M. Norwood & Co.
17 August	Urbino	Steamship	Messrs. Schlesinger, Davis & Co.	Wallsend	United Kingdom	For Messrs. Thomas Wilson, Sons, & Co.
18 August	Boyne	Steamship	Messrs. Denny & Bros.	Dumbarton	United Kingdom	For Royal Mail Steam Packet Company.
18 August	Elf	Steamship	Messrs. Doxford	Pallion	United Kingdom	For private owner.
18 August	Kwara	Steamship	Messrs. Cunliffe & Dunlop	Port Glasgow	United Kingdom	For British and African Steamship Co.
19 August	Kilkerran	East Indiaman	Messrs. John Reid & Co	Port Glasgow	United Kingdom	For Messrs. John Kerr & Co.
19 August	Precursor	Steamship	Messrs. William Hamilton & Co.	Port Glasgow	United Kingdom	For private owner.
19 August	Redgauntlet	Steamship	Messrs. Blackwood & Gordon	Port Glasgow	United Kingdom	For Messrs. George Gibson & Co.
19 August	St. Helen's	Steamship	Messrs. William Hamilton & Co.	Port Glasgow	United Kingdom	For private owner.
29 August	Foam	Ariel-class gunboat		Pembroke Dockyard	United Kingdom	For Royal Navy.
August	A. D. Bache	Steamship	Harlan and Hollingsworth	Wilmington, Delaware	United States	For United States Coast and Geodetic Survey.
August	Maria Ysasi	Barque	William Watson	Sunderland	United Kingdom	For A. de Ysasi.
August	Michael Kelly	Paddle tug	William Allsup	Preston	United Kingdom	For Dundalk Harbour Commissioners.
August	Rydal Hall	Steamship	London and Glasgow Engineering and Iron Shipbuilding Company	Glasgow	United Kingdom	For Messrs. Allan C. Gow & Co.
August	Thomas Parker	Steamship	Short Bros.	Sunderland	United Kingdom	For J. Westoll.
2 September	Margaret Banister	Schooner	William Ashburner	Barrow-in-Furness	United Kingdom	For Thomas Ashburner & Co.
2 September	Nymphoea	Steamship	Iliff & Mounsey	Sunderland	United Kingdom	For Joseph Robinson & Co.
14 September	Paslope	Steamship	Messrs. Richardson, Duck & Co.	South Stockton-on-Tees	United Kingdom	For Messrs. Hornstedt & Garthorne.
16 September	Beta	Steamship	Messrs. Humphrys & Pearson.	Hull	United Kingdom	For Messrs. Smith, Hill & Co.
16 September	Cephas	Fishing trawler	John Barter	Brixham	United Kingdom	For Nicholas J. Apter.
16 September	Hutton	Steamship	William Doxford	Sunderland	United Kingdom	For Heald & Co.
18 September	Noah's Ark	Merchantman	Rosser	Cardiff	United Kingdom	For private owner. Took 20 years to build.
19 September	Mercury	Schooner	Messrs. John Duthie & Co.	Footdee	United Kingdom	For Messrs George Elsmie & Co.
20 September	City of Montreal	Steamship	Messrs. Tod & MacGregor	Partick	United Kingdom	For Liverpool, New York & Philadelphia Steamship Company.
30 September	Anglesea Lass	Brig	A. Simey	Sunderland	United Kingdom	For William Thomas.
30 September	Colon	Steamship	Messrs. Bowdler & Chaffer	Seacombe	United Kingdom	For Messrs. M'Andrews & Co., or Serapio Acebel y Compagnia.
30 September	Como	Steamship	Messrs. C. and W. Earle and Company (Limited)	Hull	United Kingdom	For Messrs. Wilson & Co.
30 September	Firenze	Steamship	William Watson	Sunderland	United Kingdom	For Lloyd Italiano.
30 September	Hecate	Cyclops-class monitor	J. & W. Dudgeon	Cubitt Town	United Kingdom	For Royal Navy.
Unknown date	William Varney	Ketch	Burham & Co.	Aylesford	United Kingdom	For John Ward.
12 October	Decoy	Ariel-class gunboat		Pembroke Dockyard	United Kingdom	For Royal Navy.
12 October	Yorkshireman	Steamship	Joint Stock Shipbuilding Company	Hull	United Kingdom	For Messrs. Tindall & Marshall.
14 October	Glenroy	Steamship	London and Glasgow Engineering and Iron Shipbuilding Company	Glasgow	United Kingdom	For Messrs. Allan C. Gow & Co.
14 October	Gorgon	Cyclops-class monitor	Palmers Shipbuilding	Jarrow	United Kingdom	For Royal Navy.
14 October	Lotus	Steamship	Messrs. Hall, Russell & Co	Aberdeen	United Kingdom	For private owner.
14 October	Rivera	Steamship	Bowdler, Chaffer & Co.	Seacombe	United Kingdom	For MacAndrew & Co.
14 October	Tropic	Steamship	Thomas Royden & Co.	Liverpool	United Kingdom	For White Star Line.
17 October	Adriatic	Ocean liner	Harland and Wolff	Belfast	United Kingdom	For White Star Line.
26 October	Thetis	Briton-class corvette		Devonport Dockyard	United Kingdom	For Royal Navy.
28 October	Crighton	Steamship	W. Pile & Co	Sunderland	United Kingdom	For Dale & Crighton.
28 October	Lord Clive	Steamship	Messrs. R. & J. Evans	Liverpool	United Kingdom	For George Michael Papayanni and others.
30 October	Dona Luisa	Barque		Irvine	United Kingdom	For Messrs. G. Brown & Co.
30 October	Peshawar	Steamship	Messrs. Caird & Co.	Greenock	United Kingdom	For Peninsular and Oriental Steam Navigation Company.
31 October	Flor de Maria	Steamship	Messrs. Ouseburn, Graham & Co.	North Hylton	United Kingdom	For Mesrs. Bastarra Hermanes.
31 October	Skerryvore	Steamship	Messrs. Simons & Co.	Renfrew	United Kingdom	For Clyde Shipping Co.
31 October	Student	Steamship	Bowdler, Chaffer & Co.	Seacombe	United Kingdom	For T. & J. Harrison.
October	Elizabeth Stephens	Brigantine	William Bayley & Sons	Ipswich	United Kingdom	For Samuel Harris.
October	Stephen Taber	Schooner	Bedel Shipyard	Glenwood Landing, New York	United States	For Cox Brothers.
1 November	Industry	Fishing smack	Hunt	Aldeburgh	United Kingdom	For G. R. Basham.
4 November	Ananda	Steamship	Messrs. Caird & Co.	Greenock	United Kingdom	For private owner.
16 November	Saint Davids	Steamship	John Batchelor, or Batchelor Bros.	Cardiff	United Kingdom	For James Ware.
19 November	Cyclope	Workshop ship	Forges et Chantiers de la Méditerranée	La Seyne	France	For Austro-Hungarian Navy
24 November	Merlin	Ariel-class gunboat		Pembroke Dockyard	United Kingdom	For Royal Navy.
27 November	Wolf	Whaler	Messrs. Alexander Stephen & Sons	Kelvinhaugh	United Kingdom	For Messrs. Walter Grieve & Co.
28 November	Jurist	Steamship	Bowdler, Chaffer & Co.	Seacombe	United Kingdom	For T. & J. Harrison.
November	Bengalese	Steamship	William Doxford	Sunderland	United Kingdom	For Thomas Harper.
November	Bertha	Steamship	Messrs. Oswald & Co.	Sunderland	United Kingdom	For Messrs. C. M. Norwood & Co.
November	Crighton	Steamship	W. Pile & co	Sunderland	United Kingdom	For Messrs. Dale & Crighton.
1 December	Mirefield	Steamship	Messrs. Scott & Co.	Greenock	United Kingdom	For private owner.
12 December	Itajahy	Steamship	Messrs. Henry Murray & Co.	Port Glasgow	United Kingdom	For private owner.
13 December	Jessie M'Donald	Schooner	Messrs. Stephen & Forbes	Peterhead	United Kingdom	For private owner.
14 December	Santiago	Paddle steamer	Messrs. John Elder & Co.	Fairfield	United Kingdom	For Pacific Steam Navigation Company.
16 December	Zancla	Steamship	Bowdler, Chaffer & Co.	Seacombe	United Kingdom	For Edward D. Glynn.
28 December	Hydra	Cyclops-class monitor	Robert Napier and Sons	Govan	United Kingdom	For Royal Navy.
December	Amarapoora	Steamship	Messrs. William Denny & Bros.	Dumbarton	United Kingdom	For Messrs. P. Henderson & Co.
December	Anna	Barque	Messrs. Alexander Stephen & Sons	Linthouse	United Kingdom	For D. H. Wätjen & Co.
December	Consort	Steamship	William Doxford	Sunderland	United Kingdom	For W. Swainston and others.
December	Constance	Steamship	Messrs. A. & J. Inglis	Pointhouse	United Kingdom	For Malcolms & Co.
December	Demetrius	Steamship	Messrs. T. B. Seath & Co.	Rutherglen	United Kingdom	For private owner.
December	Drummon Castle	Steamship	Messrs. J. & G. Thomson	Govan	United Kingdom	For Messrs. Thomas Skinner & Co.
December	Eastward	Schooner	M'Lea	Rothesay	United Kingdom	For Donald M'Arthur.
December	Elvira	Steamship	Messrs. Tod & MacGregor	Partick	United Kingdom	For Messrs. Bahr, Behrend & Co.
December	Eringo	Schooner	M'Lea	Rothesay	United Kingdom	For Miller & M'Dougall.
December	Hajaby	Steamship	Messrs. H. Murray & Co.	Port Glasgow	United Kingdom	For private owner.
December	India	Steamship	W. Denny & Bros.	Dumbarton	United Kingdom	For Portuguese Government.
December	James Marychurch	Steamship	John Batchelor, or Batchelor Bros.	Cardiff	United Kingdom	For J. Marychurch & Co.
December	Lanarkshire	Steamship	Messrs. Blackwood & Gordon	Port Glasgow	United Kingdom	For Messrs. Turnbull & Salvesen.
December	Mosquito	Ariel-class gunboat		Pembroke Dockyard	United Kingdom	For Royal Navy.
December	Norden	Steamship	Messrs. Aitken & Mansel	Whiteinch	United Kingdom	For Norden Steamship Co.
December	North British	Steamship	Messrs. Barclay, Curle & Co.	Stobcross	United Kingdom	For R. Henderson & Co.
December	Parnassus	Steamship	London and Glasgow Engineering and Iron Shipbuilding Co.	Govan	United Kingdom	For Charles Williamson.
Unknown date	Aberdeen	Steamship	Messrs. Hall, Russell & Co.	Aberdeen	United Kingdom	For Messrs. Adam & Co.
Unknown date	Agricola	Ketch	Philip Bellot	Gorey	(United Kingdom of Great Britain and Ireland) Jersey	For Charlotte Cantell.
Unknown date	Akola	Steamship	Messrs. Palmer & Co.	River Tyne	United Kingdom	For private owner.
Unknown date	Albany	Brig	J. & J. Gibbon	Sunderland	United Kingdom	For Foulds & Co.
Unknown date	Alice	Sternwheeler		Canemah, Oregon	United States	For People's Transportation Company.
Unknown date	Ann Armytage	Barque	W. Briggs	Sunderland	United Kingdom	For Tweddle & Co.
Unknown date	Arago	Survey ship	Maury & Steinburg	New York	United States	For United States Coast and Geodetic Survey.
Unknown date	Arch Druid	Merchantman	W. Pile & Co.	Sunderland	United Kingdom	For Edward Shotton & Co.
Unknown date	Armenian	Steamship	Robert Thompson	Sunderland	United Kingdom	For John Lacy.
Unknown date	Arno	Steamship	James Laing	Sunderland	United Kingdom	For James Westoll.
Unknown date	Arrow	Ant-class gunboat	Messrs. J. & G. Rennie	Greenwich	United Kingdom	For Royal Navy.
Unknown date	Auguste Elsa	Barque	William Watson	Sunderland	United Kingdom	For U. de Ondarza.
Unknown date	Baghdad	Steamship	Messrs. W. Simons & Co.	Renfrew	United Kingdom	For Messrs. Gray, Dawes & Co.
Unknown date	Bahia	Steamship	James Laing	Sunderland	United Kingdom	For Hamburg-Amerikanische Packetfahrt-Actien-Gesellschaft.
Unknown date	Banshee	Steam yacht	William Allsup	Preston	United Kingdom	For Colonel Roden.
Unknown date	Ben Lomond	Steamship	James Laing	Sunderland	United Kingdom	For J. Morrison.
Unknown date	Benwell	Merchantman	James Laing	Sunderland	United Kingdom	For A. Pring.
Unknown date	Bon Accord	Steamship	Messrs. Hall, Russell & Co	Aberdeen	United Kingdom	For private owner.
Unknown date	Buena Ventura	Steamship	T. R. Oswald	Sunderland	United Kingdom	For Olano & Co.
Unknown date	Cap Nor	Sealer		Drammen	Norway	For private owner.
Unknown date	Celsus	Merchantman	Joseph L. Thompson	Sunderland	United Kingdom	For Culliford & Clark.
Unknown date	City of Poona	Steamship	Charles Connell and Company	Scotstoun	United Kingdom	For Smith George & Co.
Unknown date	Clarinda	Merchantman	William Doxford	Sunderland	United Kingdom	For G. J. Hay.
Unknown date	Claudia	Merchantman	D. A. Douglas	Sunderland	United Kingdom	For Morris & Co.
Unknown date	Cleanthes	Steamship	Robert Thompson	Sunderland	United Kingdom	For J. H. W. Culliford.
Unknown date	Clifton	Paddle steamer	William Allsup	Preston	United Kingdom	For Preston S. S. Co Ltd.
Unknown date	Colombo	Steamship	Messrs. C. Mitchell & Co.	Newcastle upon Tyne	United Kingdom	For Messrs. Watts, Milburn & Co.
Unknown date	Colubeik	Steamship			Russia	For private owner.
Unknown date	Comet	Sternwheeler	Simon F. Randolph	Seattle, Washington	United States	For Simon F. Randolph.
Unknown date	Commander	Steamship	William Watson	Sunderland	United Kingdom	For William Shevill Lishman.
Unknown date	Compeer	Steamship	W. Pile & Co	Sunderland	United Kingdom	For J. Hall & Co.
Unknown date	Counsellor	Steamship	T. R. Oswald	Pallion	United Kingdom	For James Turpie.
Unknown date	Dale	Merchantman	W. Pile	Sunderland	United Kingdom	For G. D. Dale & Co.
Unknown date	Dart	Fishing trawler	John Barter	Brixham	United Kingdom	For John Dennis.
Unknown date	Dei Gratia	Brigantine		Bear River	Canada	For George F. Miller.
Unknown date	Despatch	Merchantman	W. Pile	Sunderland	United Kingdom	For Banks & Mitchell.
Unknown date	Docka	Steamship			Russia	For private owner.
Unknown date	Eastella	Steamship	Blumer & Co	Sunderland	United Kingdom	For Jackson & Co.
Unknown date	E. J. Spence	Barque	Blumer & Co.	Sunderland	United Kingdom	For J. Spence.
Unknown date	Elf	Merchantman	William Doxford	Sunderland	United Kingdom	For C. M. Lofthouse & R. Glover.
Unknown date	Ella Mary	Schooner	John & William Brocklebank	Ulverston	United Kingdom	For William Brocklebank.
Unknown date	Emiliano	Merchantman	T. R. Oswald	Sunderland	United Kingdom	For Olano & Co.
Unknown date	Emma Hayward	Sternwheeler	John J. Holland	Portland, Oregon	United States	For Oregon Steam Navigation Company.
Unknown date	Escalada	Merchantman	William Pickersgill	Sunderland	United Kingdom	For J. A. de Uribe.
Unknown date	Ethel	Steamship	Robert Thompson	Sunderland	United Kingdom	For Hammond & Co.
Unknown date	Excalibur	Merchantman	T. R. Oswald	Sunderland	United Kingdom	For John R. Christie.
Unknown date	Faith	Barque	Robert Thompson	Sunderland	United Kingdom	For J. & W. Ellis.
Unknown date	Fathomer	Survey ship	C. Sharp	Philadelphia, Pennsylvania	United States	For United States Coast and Geodetic Survey.
Unknown date	Fern	Lighthouse tender	Delamater & Stack	New York	United States	For United States Treasury Department.
Unknown date	Firebrick	Steamship		Blyth	United Kingdom	For private owner.
Unknown date	Franklin	Steamship	T. R. Oswald	Sunderland	United Kingdom	For Baltischer Lloyd.
Unknown date	George H. Bradley	Steamship		Bath, Maine	United States	For Orcan Humphries.
Unknown date	George Wascoe	Merchantman	James Laing	Sunderland	United Kingdom	For James Turpie.
Unknown date	Grant	Steamship	Pusey and Jones Corporation	Wilmington, Delaware	United States	For United States Revenue Cutter Service.
Unknown date	Hassler	Steamship	Dialogue & Company	Camden, New Jersey	United States	For United States Coast Survey.
Unknown date	Hesperus	Steamship	William Watson	Sunderland	United Kingdom	For Good, Flodman & Co.
Unknown date	Hope	Barque	J. Crown	Sunderland	United Kingdom	For J. & W. Eills.
Unknown date	Humboldt	Steamship	T. R. Oswald	Sunderland	United Kingdom	For Baltischer Lloyd.
Unknown date	Hylton Castle	Steamship	T. R. Oswald	Sunderland	United Kingdom	For Laws, Cleugh & Co.
Unknown date	Industry	Fishing trawler	William Banks	Selby	United Kingdom	For The North Sea Fishing Co Ltd.
Unknown date	Jedda	Fishing trawler	John Banks Jr.	Kilpin Pike	United Kingdom	For William Beacock.
Unknown date	Joseph S. Fay	Steamship	Quayle & Martin	Cleveland, Ohio	United States	For private owner.
Unknown date	Kestrel	Barque		Horton	United Kingdom	For private owner.
Unknown date	Kingston	Steamship	T. R. Oswald	Sunderland	United Kingdom	For Mutual Steamship co. Ltd.
Unknown date	Knox	Merchantman	James Laing	Sunderland	United Kingdom	For T. Knox.
Unknown date	Lady Anne	Merchantman	James Laing	Sunderland	United Kingdom	For Earl of Durham.
Unknown date	Launceston	Steamship	Short Bros.	Sunderland	United Kingdom	For Henry Thomas Morton.
Unknown date	Lennie	Barque		Belliveau's Cove	Canada	For William W. Lovitt.
Unknown date	Leonora	Schooner	William Pickersgill	Sunderland	United Kingdom	For T. Seed & Co.
Unknown date	Lewis R. French	Schooner	French Brothers	South Bristol, Maine	United States	For French Brothers.
Unknown date	Linköping	Steamship		Sjötorp	Sweden	For P. Eggertz.
Unknown date	Lothair	Merchantman	Blumer & Co.	Sunderland	United Kingdom	For Showther & Sons.
Unknown date	Mabel	Merchantman	Blumer & Co.	Sunderland	United Kingdom	For private owner.
Unknown date	Marc Anthony	Steamship	Iliff & Mounsey	Sunderland	United Kingdom	For Joseph Fawcett.
Unknown date	Marcus	Steamship	Blume & Co.	Sunderland	United Kingdom	For Hough & Baldwin.
Unknown date	Marion Neil	Barque	Reay & Naizby	Sunderland	United Kingdom	For Dunlop & Co.
Unknown date	Marquis of Lorne	Merchantman	T. R. Oswald	Sunderland	United Kingdom	For George D. Dale and C. Palgrave.
Unknown date	Martha's Vineyard	Paddle steamer	Lawrence & Foulks	Williamsburg, New York	United Kingdom	For private owner.
Unknown date	Meteor	Steamship			Russia	For private owner.
Unknown date	Maud	Paddle steamer		Glasgow and Kingston	United Kingdom and Canada	For C. F. Gildersleve.
Unknown date	Mercator	Merchantman	James Laing	Sunderland	United Kingdom	For James Westoll.
Unknown date	Meredith	Merchantman	Iliff & Mounsey	Sunderland	United Kingdom	For J. W. Mounsey and others.
Unknown date	Monica	Merchantman	W. Pile & Co.	Sunderland	United Kingdom	For Alexander Smith.
Unknown date	Mora	Merchantman	Blumer & Co	Sunderland	United Kingdom	For Sandbach, Tinne & Co.
Unknown date	Morgenen	Whaler	Svend Foyn	Tønsberg	Norway	For private owner.
31 August	Nautilus	Albatross-class gunboat		Danzig	Germany	For Kaiserliche Marine.
Unknown date	North Eastern	Merchantman	William Doxford	Sunderland	United Kingdom	For Day & Farlan.
Unknown date	North Pacific	Paddle steamer		San Francisco, California	United States	For E. A. & L. M. Starr.
Unknown date	Oceano	Steamship	Messrs. Backhouse & Dixon	Middlesbrough	United Kingdom	For private owner.
Unknown date	Olive	Barque	Gibbon & Nichol	South Hylton	United Kingdom	For Olive & Co.
Unknown date	Olympias	Merchantman	W. Pile & Co.	Sunderland	United Kingdom	For A. Smith and others.
Unknown date	Oriental	Steamship	W. Pile & Co	Sunderland	United Kingdom	For River Parana Steamship Co. Ltd.
Unknown date	Palestro	Principe Amedeo-class ironclad	Arsenale di La Spezia	La Spezia	Italy	For Regia Marina.
Unknown date	Paragon	Merchantman	W. Richardson	Sunderland	United Kingdom	For S. Tandevin.
Unknown date	Per Ardua	Full-rigged ship	Robert Thompson	Sunderland	United Kingdom	For Louis H. MacIntyre.
Unknown date	Pickwick	Steamship	W. Pile & Co	Sunderland	United Kingdom	For g. Bell & Co.
Unknown date	Princess Louise	Barque	Robert Thompson	Sunderland	United Kingdom	For Eggleston & Sons.
Unknown date	Raven	Steam barge	T. B. Seath & Co.	Rutherglen	United Kingdom	For Furness Railway.
Unknown date	Redesdale	Steamship	Robert Thompson	Sunderland	United Kingdom	For Milburn Bros.
Unknown date	Richard M'Nab	Steamship	Messrs. C. Mitchell & Co.	Newcastle upon Tyne	United Kingdom	For Messrs. Watts, Milburn & Co.
Unknown date	Richard Young	Paddle steamer	J. & W. Dudgeon	Cubitt Town	United Kingdom	For Great Eastern Railway.
Unknown date	Ringdove	Steamship	T. R. Oswald	Sunderland	United Kingdom	For L. Breslauer.
Unknown date	Santo Antonio	Tug	J. Crown	Sunderland	United Kingdom	For Stevenson & Co.
Unknown date	S. C. Baldwin	Steam barge	Campbell, Owen & Co.	Detroit, Michigan	United States	For Adolph Green.
Unknown date	Sea Gull	Tug	Joseph Brinkworth	Bristol	United Kingdom	For Edward Sparshott.
Unknown date	Silliman	Schooner	Fardy & Woodall	Baltimore, Maryland	United States	For United States Coast and Geodetic Survey.
Unknown date	Sixty-six	Steamship	Messrs. Backhouse & Dixon	Middlesbrough	United Kingdom	For private owner.
Unknown date	Stephanotis	Steamship	Iliff & Mounsey	Sunderland	United Kingdom	For Joseph Robinson & Co.
Unknown date	Strathclyde	Steamship			United Kingdom	For private owner.
Unknown date	Strathearn	Schooner	J. Crown	Sunderland	United Kingdom	For J. C. Cairns.
Unknown date	Sunfoo	Steamship			United Kingdom	For private owner.
Unknown date	Terlings	Merchantman	Blumer & Co.	Sunderland	United Kingdom	For Young & co.
Unknown date	Teviot	Steamship	James Laing	Sunderland	United Kingdom	For C. M. Norwood & Co.
Unknown date	Thistle	Steamship	Robert Thompson	Sunderland	United Kingdom	For E. Jinman.
Unknown date	Tigress	Whaler	Harvey & Co.	Quebec	Canada	For private owner.
Unknown date	Tunstall	Merchantman	James Laing	Sunderland	United Kingdom	For Charles Taylor.
Unknown date	Umzinto	Merchantman	W. Pile & Co.	Sunderland	United Kingdom	For Bullard, King & Co.
Unknown date	Walamo	Steamship	Messrs. C. & W. Earle	Hull	United Kingdom	For private owner.
Unknown date	Warden Law	Barque	J. Gill	Sunderland	United Kingdom	For Gayner & Co.
Unknown date	White Sea	Steamship	Joseph L. Thompson	Sunderland	United Kingdom	For Dent, Hodgson & Co.
Unknown date	Xantho	Steamship	Messrs. C. & W. Earle	Hull	United Kingdom	For private owner.
Unknown date	Yrurac Bat	Merchantman	T. R. Oswald	Sunderland	United Kingdom	For Olano & Co.
Unknown date	Zephyr	Sternwheeler			United States	For Tom Wright.
