= USC&GS Fathomer =

USC&GS Fathomer was the name of two United States Coast and Geodetic Survey ships, and may refer to:

- USC&GS Fathomer (1871), previously USCS Fathomer, a survey ship in service in the United States Coast Survey from 1871 to 1878 and in the U.S. Coast and Geodetic Survey from 1878 to 1881
- USC&GS Fathomer (1904), a survey ship in service from 1905 to 1942
