= List of shipwrecks in June 1882 =

The list of shipwrecks in June 1882 includes ships sunk, foundered, grounded, or otherwise lost during June 1882.

== 1 June ==
List of shipwrecks: 1 June 1882
| Ship | State | Description |
|---|---|---|
| Elleholm | Sweden | The schooner ran aground on the Sunk Sand, in the North Sea off the coast of Essex, United Kingdom. She was on a voyage from Söderhamn to Dover, Kent, United Kingdom. She was refloated and towed in to Harwich, Essex in a waterlogged condition. |
| Forsete | Sweden | The barque was driven ashore at New Romney, Kent. |
| Hurir | Sweden | The schooner was driven ashore at Dragør, Denmark. She was on a voyage from Oscarshamn to Sheerness, Kent. |

== 2 June ==
List of shipwrecks: 2 June 1882
| Ship | State | Description |
|---|---|---|
| Achilles | United Kingdom | The steamship ran aground in the Yangtze at Hankou, China. She was on a voyage from Hankou to London. She was refloated and resumed her voyage. |
| Alpha | Norway | The brig ran aground in The Swale near the Kingsferry Bridge. She was on a voyage from Dram to Milton Regis, Kent, United Kingdom. |
| Lizzie English | United Kingdom | The steamship struck the pier at Kronstadt, Russia and was severely damaged. She was on a voyage from Kronstadt to Finnklippan. She put back to Cornstadt for repairs. |
| Melanie Heloise | France | The schooner parted her chains in Whitesand Bay, Cornwall, United Kingdom and was holed when she fouled an English schooner and drifted past the Longships Lighthouse. She was abandoned 19 nautical miles (35 km) off Land's End, Cornwall. Her crew were rescued by the schooner Bull (United Kingdom). |
| Otto | Sweden | The brigantine was driven ashore at Poole, Dorset, United Kingdom. She was on a voyage from Gävle to Poole. She was refloated on 4 June and towed in to Poole. |
| Primus | United Kingdom | The steamship was driven ashore and wrecked near the "Kyleakin Lighthouse". |

== 3 June ==
List of shipwrecks: 3 June 1882
| Ship | State | Description |
|---|---|---|
| Albatross | United States | The schooner lost her sails in a storm and drifted into the breakers at St. Andrews, Florida. |
| Xema | United Kingdom | The yacht was wrecked on the Mouse Sand, in the North Sea off the coast of Essex. Her crew were rescued by the tug Alarm (United Kingdom). Xema was on a voyage from Erith, Kent to Harwich, Essex. |

== 5 June ==
List of shipwrecks: 5 June 1882
| Ship | State | Description |
|---|---|---|
| Alabama | Sweden | The barque collided with the steamship Gozo (United Kingdom) and became waterlogged. Alabama was on a voyage from Härnösand to Boulogne, Pas-de-Calais, France. She was towed in to Gothenburg by Gozo. |
| Birdston | United Kingdom | The barque collided with the barque Largs (United Kingdom) off Dungeness, Kent and was severely damaged. Birdston was on a voyage from South Shields, County Durham to Valparaíso, Chile. She was towed in to the River Thames by the tug Cruiser (United Kingdom). |
| Elagh Castle | United Kingdom | The steamship was damaged at Cruit Island, County Donegal. She was on a voyage from Londonderry to Burton. |

== 6 June ==
List of shipwrecks: 6 June 1882
| Ship | State | Description |
|---|---|---|
| Arch Druid | United Kingdom | The steamship was driven ashore at Cape Scala, Italy. She was refloated. |
| Blodwen | United Kingdom | The steamship ran aground on a reef off Romsø, Denmark. She was on a voyage from Akyab, Burma to Flensburg, Germany. |

== 7 June ==
List of shipwrecks: 7 June 1882
| Ship | State | Description |
|---|---|---|
| Douglas | United Kingdom | The steamship ran aground on the Cockle Sand, in the North Sea off the coast of Norfolk. She was on a voyage from Sunderland, County Durham to London. She was refloated with the assistance of two tugs and resumed her voyage. |
| Westminster | United Kingdom | The Thames barge was run down and sunk in the River Thames by the steamship Virgo (United Kingdom). |

== 9 June ==
List of shipwrecks: 9 June 1882
| Ship | State | Description |
|---|---|---|
| Luigia C | Italy | The barque was wrecked. Three crew were rescued. She was on a voyage from Liverpool, Lancashire, United Kingdom to Rangoon, Burma. |
| William Edwards | United Kingdom | The schooner ran aground near Dungarvan, County Waterford. She was on a voyage from Cork to Dungarvan. She was later refloated and taken in to Dungarvan. |

== 10 June ==
List of shipwrecks: 10 June 1882
| Ship | State | Description |
|---|---|---|
| La Sirène | (France) Miquelon | The fishing schooner was sunk by ice in the Grand Banks of Newfoundland with the loss of all seventeen crew. |
| Pera | United Kingdom | The steamship collided with an iceberg and foundered in the Atlantic Ocean 30 nautical miles (56 km) south west of Cape Race, Newfoundland Colony. Her 40 passengers and crew took to three boats; 30 people in two boats were rescued by the steamship Lake Manitoba (United Kingdom). Ten people in the third boat were rescued by the schooner Florella (United Kingdom). Pera was on a voyage from Quebec City, Canada to London. |

== 11 June ==
List of shipwrecks: 11 June 1882
| Ship | State | Description |
|---|---|---|
| Largo | United Kingdom | The ship was sighted off Dover, Kent whilst on a voyage from Newcastle upon Tyne, Northumberland, to Valparaíso, Chile. No further trace. |
| Mathilda | United Kingdom | The schooner was abandoned in the North Sea. She was discovered on 14 June by Evangelist (United Kingdom), which towed her in to Hull, Yorkshire in a leaky condition on 19 June. |
| Webster Sanborn | United States | The fishing schooner was wrecked near Petit Harbour, Newfoundland Colony. Her crew were rescued. |

== 12 June ==
List of shipwrecks: 12 June 1882
| Ship | State | Description |
|---|---|---|
| Iron Eva | United Kingdom | Eleven of the crew abandoned the vessel when it was sinking. Others, including the captain and mate were left on board when their lifeboat broke adrift. The steamship was carrying deal, iron and oats from Gothenburg, Sweden to London. |
| John | United Kingdom | The Thames barge sank in the Royal Victoria Dock, London. |

== 13 June ==
List of shipwrecks: 13 June 1882
| Ship | State | Description |
|---|---|---|
| Evangelistra | Greece | The ship collided with an Ottoman Navy man-of-war and was severely damaged. She was on a voyage from Marianople, Russia to an English port. |

== 15 June ==
List of shipwrecks: 15 June 1882
| Ship | State | Description |
|---|---|---|
| Edeline | United Kingdom | The barque collided with an iceberg and sank in the Atlantic Ocean. Her crew were rescued by the schooner Mary F. Chisholm (United States). Edeline was on a voyage from New York, United States to Kristiansand, Norway. |
| Kepler | United Kingdom | The schooner collided with a steam hopper and sank 5 nautical miles (9.3 km) from Londonderry. She was on a voyage from Londonderry to Greenock, Renfrewshire. |

== 16 June ==
List of shipwrecks: 16 June 1882
| Ship | State | Description |
|---|---|---|
| Euphemia Campbell | United Kingdom | The ship ran aground in the River Spey, capsized and sank. She was on a voyage from Sunderland, County Durham to Garmouth, Moray. |
| Leon XIII | Flag unknown | The ship ran aground in the Suez Canal. |
| Lilydale | United Kingdom | The steamship ran aground and was wrecked at "Gudstav", Denmark. She was on a voyage from Hartlepool, County Durham to Flensburg, Germany. |
| Massasoit | United States | The fishing schooner struck an iceberg during a thick fog on the Grand Banks of Newfoundland and sank. Six of the crew went down with the ship. The captain and the rest of the crew rowed to Saint John's, Newfoundland Colony in her dories. |
| Oak | United Kingdom | The ship ran aground on the Holmsand, in the North Sea off the coast of Suffolk. She was on a voyage from Seaham, County Durham to London. She was refloated and taken in to Lowestoft, Suffolk in a leaky condition. |

== 17 June ==
List of shipwrecks: 17 June 1882
| Ship | State | Description |
|---|---|---|
| Hornby Castle | United Kingdom | The ship ran aground in the Thanlwin. She was on a voyage from Melbourne, Victoria to Rangoon, Burma. |
| J. Llewellyn | United Kingdom | The ship was severely damaged by fire at London. |

== 19 June ==
List of shipwrecks: 19 June 1882
| Ship | State | Description |
|---|---|---|
| Barrowdale | United Kingdom | The steamship ran aground off the Rabbit Islands, Ottoman Empire. She was on a voyage from Odesa, Russia to North Shields, Northumberland. |
| Escambia | United Kingdom | The steamship capsized and sank 5 nautical miles (9.3 km) off San Francisco, California, United States, with the loss of twenty lives. She was on a voyage from San Francisco to the Cape Verde Islands. |

== 21 June ==
List of shipwrecks: 21 June 1882
| Ship | State | Description |
|---|---|---|
| Augustus | Germany | The steamship struck a rock near "Ujusut", Russia and sprang a leak. |
| Valhalla | Norway | The barque ran aground at Hittarp, Sweden. She was on a voyage from Granton, Lothian, United Kingdom to Copenhagen, Denmark. She was refloated with the assistance of a steamship and resumed her voyage. |

== 23 June ==
List of shipwrecks: 23 June 1882
| Ship | State | Description |
|---|---|---|
| Amanuel | Norway | The ship ran aground at Sandhammaren, Sweden. |
| Bonafide | Norway | The ship ran aground at Sandhammaren. |
| Martha | Norway | The ship ran aground at Sandhammaren. |
| Vic | United Kingdom | The No. 3 pilot cutter, based at Falmouth, Cornwall, was run down in the English Channel, by the steamship Rosina (Flag unknown) about 3 nautical miles (5.6 km) off St Anthony Head, Cornwall. Her six crew survived. |
| No. 3 | United Kingdom | The pilot cutter was run down and sunk by the steamship Rossini (Flag unknown) at Falmouth, Cornwall. Her crew were rescued. |

== 28 June ==
List of shipwrecks: 28 June 1882
| Ship | State | Description |
|---|---|---|
| Lizzie | Norway | The barque was driven ashore. She was refloated on 30 June and taken in to Sundsvall, Sweden for repairs. |

== 29 June ==
List of shipwrecks: 29 June 1882
| Ship | State | Description |
|---|---|---|
| Alice | United Kingdom | The steam tug left South Shields, County Durham for Warkworth, Northumberland with one hundred passengers. Alice hit rocks near Bondicar Point in fog and most of the passengers were taken off in fishing boats. The ship's boat submerged when launched with seventeen onboard, only three survived. |
| Bergliot | Norway | The barque collided with the steamship Tirante (United Kingdom) and was abandoned off Mizen Head, County Cork, United Kingdom. Six of her eleven crew were rescued by Tirante, the rest by the pilot cutter Wyceret (United Kingdom). Bergliot was on a voyage from Charleston, South Carolina to Bristol, Gloucestershire, United Kingdom. She was subsequently towed in to Crookhaven, County Cork by the thg Mount Etna (United Kingdom). |

== 30 June ==
List of shipwrecks: 30 June 1882
| Ship | State | Description |
|---|---|---|
| Halcyon | United Kingdom | The brig ran aground on the Scroby Sands, Norfolk. She was refloated and taken in to Great Yarmouth, Norfolk. |
| Lady of the Lake | United Kingdom | The barque was wrecked on an unknown shoal near Maranhão, Brazil. Her crew reached Maranhão in the boats. She was on a voyage from Liverpool, Lancashire to Maranhão with machinery and railway plant. The subsequent Board of Trade Inquiry determined that the loss was due to navigational error. |

== Unknown date ==
List of shipwrecks: Unknown date in June 1882
| Ship | State | Description |
|---|---|---|
| Albion | United Kingdom | The ship ran aground on the Long Sand, in the North Sea off the coast of Essex. Her crew survived. |
| Asdrubal | United Kingdom | The steamship collided with an iceberg and sank off the coast of the Newfoundland Colony. She was on a voyage from Saint John, New Brunswick, Canada to Bristol, Gloucestershire. |
| Cabon | Flag unknown | The steamship was driven ashore and wrecked on Cape Breton Island, Nova Scotia, Canada. Her crew were rescued. |
| Canadian | United Kingdom | The steamship was driven ashore at Halifax, Nova Scotia. She was later refloated. |
| Charger | United States | The ship caught fire whilst on a voyage from New York to San Francisco, California. She put back to New York. |
| Dirigo | United States | The barque was driven ashore and wrecked at "Video", China. Her crew were rescued. The wreck was pillaged by the local inhabitants. |
| Ebenezer Parry | United Kingdom | The schooner foundered at "Teilleborg". Her crew were rescued. She was on a voyage from Neufahrwasser, Germany to Bordeaux, Gironde, France. |
| Gloria Deo | Italy | The barque was wrecked at the "Ratet River", Cape Colony. Her crew were rescued. |
| Helene | Germany | The schooner was driven ashore at Ålsgårde, Denmark. She was on a voyage from Cardiff, Glamorgan, United Kingdom to Saint Petersburg, Russia. |
| Hermine | Sweden | The schooner was driven ashore at "Sonderose", Denmark. |
| Icelandais | France | The schooner was wrecked on the coast of Iceland. Her crew were rescued. |
| James L. Harway | United States | The ship collided with the steamship Frisia (Germany) and sank. |
| Jessie Goodwin | United States | The ship was driven ashore at Philadelphia, Pennsylvania. She was on a voyage from Cárdenas, Cuba to Philadelphia. |
| Julia Baker | United States | The ship ran aground in the Schuylkill River and sank. She was on a voyage from Philadelphia to Baracoa, Cuba. |
| Lizzie Cameron | Canada | The barque collided with an iceberg and sank the coast of the Newfoundland Colony. She was on a voyage from Charlottetown, Prince Edward Island to Bordeaux. |
| Llewellyn | New South Wales | The collier, a steamship, was lost off the coast of New South Wales. Her crew were rescued. |
| Min-y-don | United Kingdom | The clipper ship foundered off the coast of Australia with the loss of her 30 crew. |
| Nancy | United Kingdom | The brig foundered off The Smalls, Pembrokeshire. Her crew were rescued by a steamship. She was on a voyage from Cardiff to Waterford. |
| Providence | United Kingdom | The schooner sprang a leak and foundered in the North Sea off the Cockle Lightship ( Trinity House). Her crew were rescued. She was on a voyage from London to Middlesbrough, Yorkshire. |
| Rasonia | Russia | The schooner was abandoned in the North Sea. Her crew were rescued. she was on a voyage from Bo'ness, Lothian, United Kingdom to Narva. |
| Ruth Darling | United States | The ship ran aground at Cape Henelopen, Delaware. She was on a voyage from Saint Lucia to Philadelphia. She was refloated and taken in to the Delaware Breakwater in a severely leaky condition. |
| San Agostino | Italy | The barque foundered 21 nautical miles (39 km) south east by south of Diamond Island, Burma. She was on a voyage from Rangoon, Burma to the English Channel. |
| Sunrise | United Kingdom | The steamship was wrecked on the Duco Rock, south of Cape Finisterre, Spain before 23 June. |
| Sweet Home | United Kingdom | The schooner was driven ashore and wrecked at "Christovas", Brazil. |
| Virago | United Kingdom | The steamship sank off Alderney, Channel Islands with the loss of all 26 crew. She was on a voyage from Hull, Yorkshire to Odesa, Russia. |
| No. 27 | United Kingdom | The pilot boat was driven ashore and wrecked at Aberthan, Glamorgan. |
