= Kestrel (barque) =

British clipper ship 1871–1895, wrecked on Santos Beach

Coordinates: 23°58′44″S 46°19′00″W

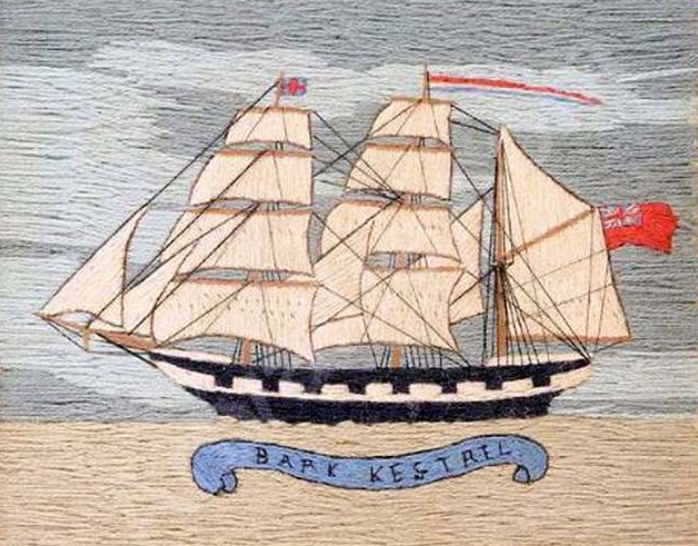

United Kingdom
- Laid down: 1871
- Fate: Driven aground, 11 February 1895
- Rediscovered: 2017
- Current location: Embare Beach, Santos, near São Paulo, Brazil

The Kestrel was a British barque that was built in 1871 with coal-fueled steam engines and three masts. She spent her career carrying goods across the Atlantic. On 11 February 1895 she was anchored at Santos, near São Paulo, Brazil, when she was caught in a tropical storm. Her anchor chain broke, and she was driven aground on to Boqueirao Beach. All but three crewmen were ashore when the ship was grounded, including Captain Cochrane. The remains of the ship were rediscovered in 2017 after they were uncovered by a storm.

== Construction and service ==
Built in December 1871 at the Horton shipyard, with official number 66481. She spent her career carrying goods across the Atlantic. Over 24 years in service, she was captained by seven people, Captains D. L. Faulkner, G. W. Olsen, Lockhardt, McLeod, Norton, Priest, and Cochrane.

In 1895 she was transporting goods between New York and Brazil, after completing a journey from Europe to the United States.

== Grounding ==
On 11 February 1895 she was anchored at Santos, near São Paulo, Brazil, when she was caught in a tropical storm. Her anchor chain broke, and she was driven aground onto the Beach. All but three crewmen were ashore when the ship was grounded, including Captain Cochrane, with only a single sailor, a cook, and a helper on board. An attempt to rescue the ship using a tugboat was unsuccessful.

The ship's registration was closed in 1896.

== Rediscovery ==
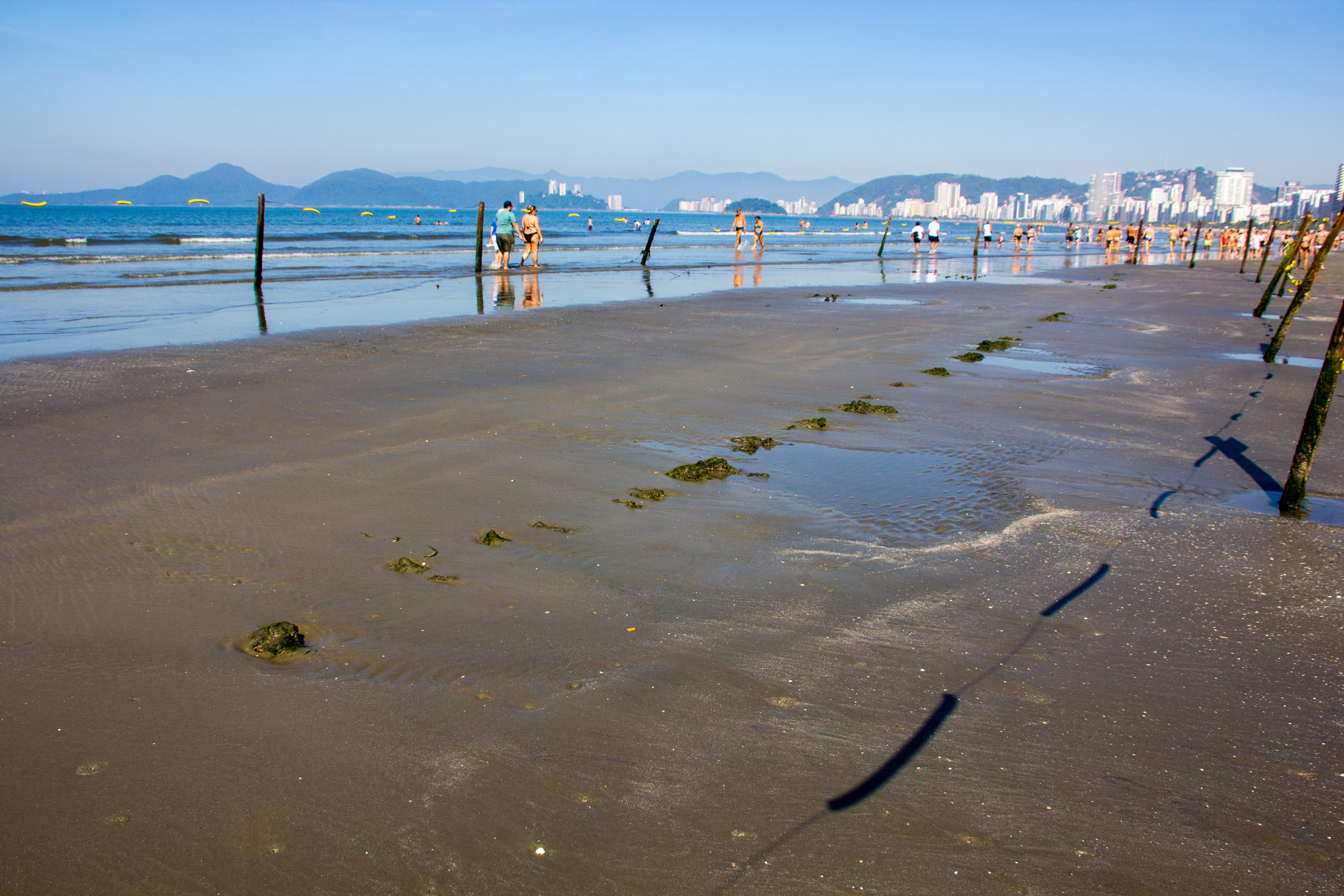
The wreck on the beach in Santos

The remains of a wooden sailboat were rediscovered on Embare Beach, near to Canal 5, on 22 August 2017 by a beach cleaning crew during low tide after storm erosion. Around 1.5 metres (4.9 ft) of sand were removed from the beach since the construction of Canal 5 in 1927.

The ship was built before 1930, given the materials used, and the wreck is 50 by 12 metres (164 ft × 39 ft) in size. Initially it was thought that it might be the Vapor Glória or the steamship Gloria, but both of these were ruled out and it is currently believed to be the Kestrel. Other possibilities are Elitel Fritz or Madonna Della Costa, which both ran aground in the same area in 1894.

The wreck is around 3 m (9.8 ft) in depth, with the stern next to Canal 5 and the bow towards São Vicente. An initial survey took place on 21 September, which discovered a metal object about 6 by 2 metres (19.7 ft × 6.6 ft) inside the wreck, on the left near the centre of the ship, the nature of which is not currently known.

The excavation is being led by the archaeologist professor Manoel Gonzalez, with a team of 6, pending authorisation for the excavation from the Brazilian navy. The excavation is expected to take two months, with the aim of removing the entire wreck, and is expected to cost around R$1 million. Until then the wreck is cordoned off for security and monitored with a camera.

The wreck was subsequently buried by sand again, before becoming visible again on 17 August 2019. 4-metre-long metal stakes were installed around it on 29–30 August, buried to a depth of 1.5 metres, with connecting ropes to keep people away from the wreck. It was also visible in July 2020. Debate on whether it is indeed the Kestrel, or another ship, continues.

As of 2026, the wreck is an open air tourist attraction, with a commemorative plaque and a QR code to view the ship in augmented reality.
