= Toivo (ship) =

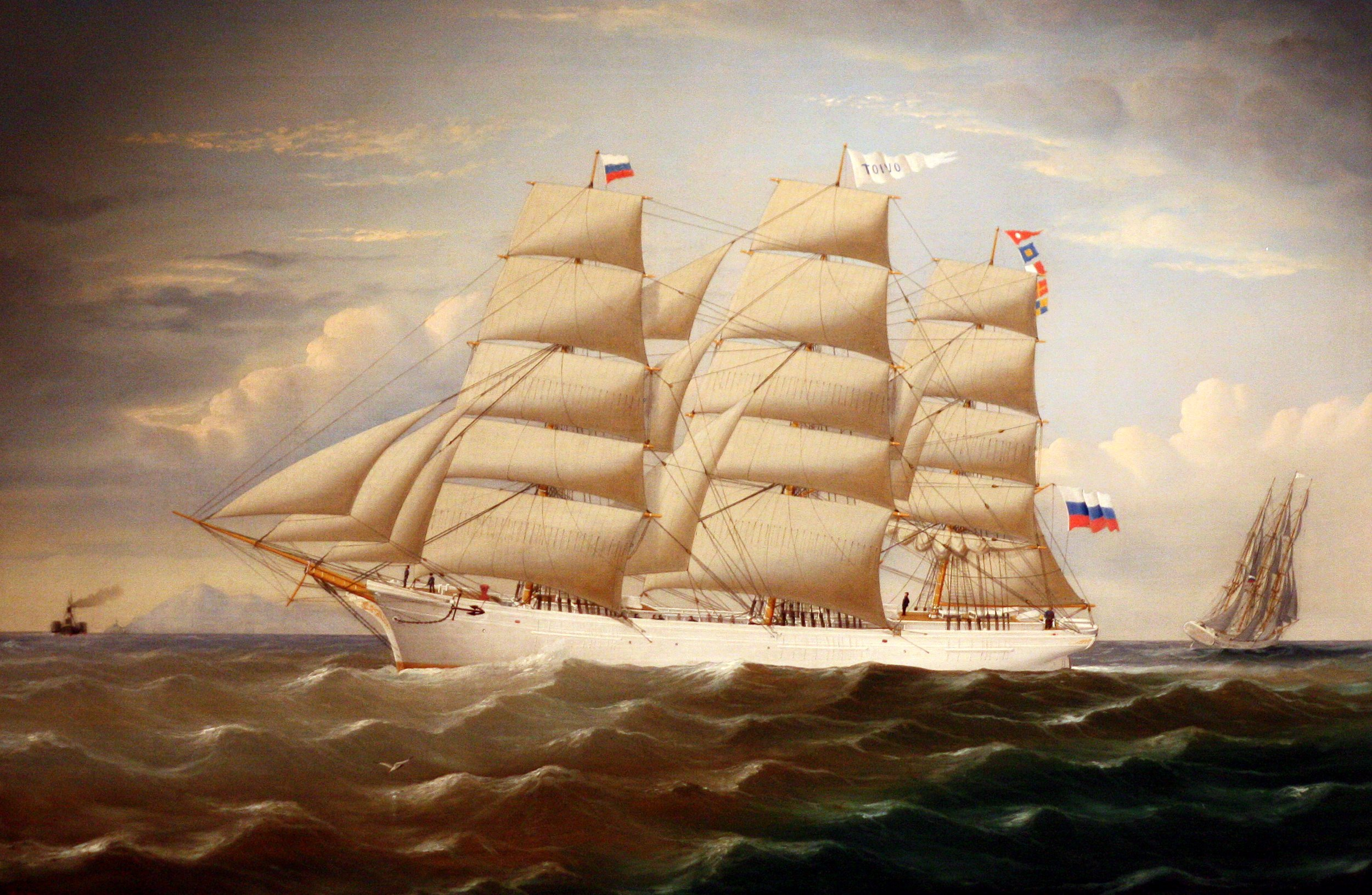
- Toivo painted in 1872 by W. H. Yorke

History
- Name: Toivo
- Owner: 1871–1888: Tradehouse J. W. Snellman; 1888–1895: Eriksen & Gjersöe
- Port of registry: 1871–1888: Oulu, Grand Duchy of Finland (Russia); 1888–1895: Kristiania, Norway
- Builder: Toppila shipyard, Oulu, Grand Duchy of Finland
- Launched: 29 July 1871
- In service: 18 October 1871
- Out of service: 1895
- Fate: Unknown

General characteristics
- Tonnage: 1,060 GRT
- Tons burthen: 530
- Length: 170 ft (51.82 m)
- Beam: 37 ft (11.28 m)
- Sail plan: 1871–1880: frigate; 1880–1895: bark

Toivo (English: Hope) was a frigate built in 1871 at the Toppila shipyard in Oulu, Finland (then a part of the Russian Empire) for Tradehouse J. W. Snellman. Toivo was re-rigged as a bark in 1880. She sailed for Tradehouse J. W. Snellman until 1888, when she was sold to Eriksen & Gjersöe, Sweden-Norway. The ship is believed to have been taken out of service in 1895.

Actions of the Toivo's first captain Henrik Wilhelm Snellman Junior are the subject of the Finnish folk protest song "Laiva Toivo, Oulu", set to the melody of "Marching Through Georgia". The lyrics of the song, which paint H. W. Snellman in an unsymphatetic light, were probably written by Jaakko Haataja, who was the second mate of the Toivo on her third voyage from Europe to East Asia in 1874–1875.
