= USC&GS Fathomer (1871) =

Steamer that served as a survey ship in the United States Coast Survey

History

United States
- Name: Fathomer
- Namesake: One who fathoms, i.e., measures the depth of or takes a sounding of, a body of water
- Builder: C. Sharp, Philadelphia, Pennsylvania
- Completed: 1871
- Commissioned: 1871
- Decommissioned: 1881
- Fate: Sold 1884

General characteristics
- Type: Survey ship
- Length: 76 ft (23 m)
- Beam: 16 ft (4.9 m)
- Draft: 4 ft (1.2 m)
- Propulsion: Steam engine

USCS, later USC&GS, Fathomer was a steamer that served as a survey ship in the United States Coast Survey from 1871 to 1878 and in the United States Coast and Geodetic Survey from 1878 to 1881. She was the only Coast Survey and first Coast and Geodetic Survey ship of the name.

Fathomer was built by C. Sharp at Philadelphia, Pennsylvania, in 1871. She initially entered service in the U.S. Coast Survey. When the Coast Survey was reorganized in 1878 to form the Coast and Geodetic Survey, she became a part of the new service.

Fathomer operated along the United States East Coast during her career. She was laid up at Washington, D.C., in 1881 and sold in 1884.
