= SS Virago =

British merchant ship (1871–1882)

SS Virago was a passenger and cargo ship operated by Thomas Wilson Sons & Co. She was built in 1871 in Hull by Earle's Shipbuilding and operated initially on routes between Britain and India. Virago was later switched to routes to the United States and the Mediterranean. She underwent a refit in 1881 and was lost at sea on 3 June 1882 while en route between Hull and Constantinople. The wreck of Virago was discovered off Alderney by a survey in 2009 but not identified until a series of dives was made on the ship in 2022.

== Construction ==
Virago was built in 1871 in Kingston upon Hull, England, by Earle's Shipbuilding under yard number 138. She was ordered by the Thomas Wilson Sons & Co. shipping line as one of a class of four passenger and cargo vessels designed to make use of the then recently-completed Suez Canal. Her sister ships were Xantho, Yeddo, and Walamo.

Virago had one main deck and a poop deck with wheelhouse located at midships and aft. She carried two masts and was brigantine rigged but also had screw propulsion driven by two compound steam engines with a total of 250 horsepower (190 kW). She measured 282 feet (86 m) in length, 34 feet 8 inches (10.57 m) in breadth and 19 feet (5.8 m) in depth. Virago had a gross register tonnage of 1,809, a net register tonnage of 1,454 and an underdeck tonnage of 1,492.

== Operation and sinking ==
House flag of Thomas Wilson Sons & Co.

Virago was based at Hull and spent much of her early career carrying trade goods to and from British India, via the Suez Canal. Later she operated on routes to the Mediterranean nation and the United States. Virago was refitted in 1881 to a schooner rig and her engines replaced with two new 140-horsepower (100 kW) engines manufactured by Amos and Smith of Hull. The alterations increased her net register tonnage to 1,470.

Last journey of the Virago

Virago left the port of Hull at 6:00 am on 31 May 1882, under the command of Captain John Henry Stephens. She was carrying a cargo of 752 long tons (764 t) of coal from the Allerton Main Colliery and 1,039 long tons (1,056 t) of other goods. The latter included agricultural machinery destined for Ukraine made by Clayton & Shuttleworth of Lincoln including five stationary steam engines, grindstones and spare wheels. Virago was bound for Odessa in the Russian Empire via Constantinople in the Ottoman Empire and carried 500 long tons (510 t) of coal as bunker fuel. She was sighted passing Deal and then Dover (at 6 am) on 1 June but never seen again.

There was originally little concern from her owners that she had not been sighted passing through the Straits of Gibraltar as their vessels often passed through unnoticed at night. One of Virago's seven lifeboats was recovered off Alderney by the steamer Courier on 3 June and the same day Marchionesse reported sighting two boats, including one marked Virago, around 7 nautical miles (13 km; 8.1 mi) northeast of Alderney. On 17 June a French fishing vessel reported passing a capsized boat marked Virago around 10 nautical miles (19 km; 12 mi) off Cape d'Ailly and on 19 June a French fishing boat picked up a lifeboat marked Virago alongside a barrel of oil and a plank, 10 nautical miles (19 km; 12 mi) north of Dieppe, France. The body of Virago's second mate washed ashore at Cherbourg, France, in early July and it was concluded that she had been lost with all 26 crew on 3 June.

Stevens had an unfortunate history with vessels under his command. He was master of the steamer Shoolia when it had foundered in heavy seas in the Bay of Biscay and was master of the Wilson Line's liner Hindoo when it lost steering and foundered, causing the deaths of three of its crew. The master's mate on the final voyage of Virago had escaped drowning a few weeks before when his vessel Apollo was run down by a French steamer. The loss of Virago was used as an example in a campaign to have Plimsoll lines marked on ships to prevent their overloading; this was made compulsory for British-flagged ships by the Merchant Shipping Act 1894.

=== Investigation ===
The Board of Trade held an inquiry into the sinking of Virago at the Hull Sessions Court on 9 and 10 August 1882. The court heard that Walamo had been lost due to the movement of one of her armoured plates but Virago's chief mate, who missed her final voyage as he was sitting his master mariner's exam, testified to her seaworthiness. The court was told that Virago left Hull with a draught of 16 feet 11 inches (5.16 m) and a freeboard of 2 feet 9.5 inches (0.851 m). A Board of Trade surveyor testified that in his opinion the freeboard was not sufficient for a vessel of this size but that she was not overloaded, having 18% spare buoyancy. The court considered that her load would have reduced to 2,296 long tons (2,333 t) by the time of her sinking due to the consumption of bunker fuel and her freeboard would have improved to 3 feet 1.5 inches (0.953 m). The court judged that she was heavily loaded but did not state that she was overloaded.

The ship was not insured and the cargo had been only partially insured by Wilson to a value of £2,000. The court heard evidence from the colliery and inspectors that spontaneous combustion was unlikely to have occurred in the type of coal carried and this was ruled out as a cause. Despite an initial suspicion that Virago had been lost in a collision with another vessel the court failed to determine the cause or location of her loss.

== Discovery ==
The wreck of Virago was discovered in 2009 during surveys ahead of a proposed tidal energy scheme for Alderney Renewable Energy Ltd. Surveyors for Osiris Projects spotted a wreck during a survey of the seabed in the Alderney Race, 2 nautical miles (3.7 km; 2.3 mi) east of the island (49°41.759′N 02°08.882′W). The United Kingdom Hydrographic Office assigned the wreck the identification number of 79335. The surveys showed the wreck sitting upright on the seabed in 45 metres (148 ft) of water, posing no threat to shipping. The centre portion of the wreck had collapsed. The depth of water and the granite seabed at this location render it relatively unsuited to trawling, which may have located the wreck sooner.

The wreck was first dived in mid 2022. Divers expected it to be a vessel of the First World War era but upon encountering it they identified it as Virago. These waters are some of the most tidal in the seas around the British Isles, with tidal flows of around 7 knots (13 km/h; 8.1 mph). Divers can operate on the wreck for only around twenty minutes around neap tide. Alderney's Henry Euler Memorial Trust charity is carrying out research to try to identify those crewmen who were lost in the wreck and their descendants.

Following discovery of the location of the wreck it is now thought that the sinking of Virago was caused by her striking the coast of Alderney or a nearby reef, particularly as it is known to have been foggy at the time.
