= Centennial (pilot boat) =

New Jersey Pilot boat

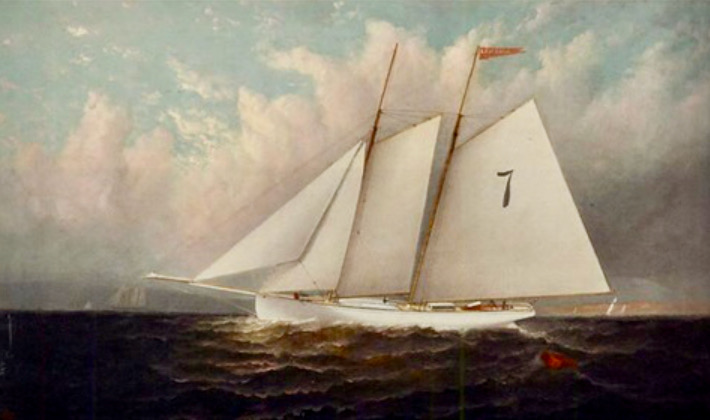
- Painting of Centennial pilot boat No. 7, by Elisha Taylor Baker.

History

United States
- Name: Centennial
- Owner: Beebe & Hopkins of New York (1876); N. J. Pilots (1877–1899)
- Operator: John Hopkins (1877–1879); John I. Godby (1881–1884); Beebe (1885–1899)
- Builder: Robert Crosbie; Designed by Dennison J. Lawlor
- Cost: $10,000
- Launched: February 22, 1876
- Out of service: September 16, 1898
- Fate: Sold

General characteristics
- Class & type: schooner
- Tonnage: 60-tons TM
- Length: 76 ft 0 in (23.16 m)
- Beam: 20 ft 6 in (6.25 m)
- Draft: 0 ft 0 in (0 m)
- Depth: 8 ft 6 in (2.59 m)
- Propulsion: Sail
- Notes: Cabins were ash finish, with black walnut trimmings, fitted with modern amenities.

The Centennial was a 19th-century wood pilot boat built in 1876 by Robert Crosbie and designed by Boston designer Dennison J. Lawlor for New York and New Jersey pilots. She was one of the pilot-boats that survived the Great Blizzard of 1888. By 1898, in the age of steam, she was the last pilot boat left in the fleet; then sold in 1898 to a group in Montego Bay, Jamaica.

== Construction and service ==
On February 22, 1876, prominent naval architect Dennison J. Lawlor of Chelsea, Massachusetts, contracted Robert Crosbie to build the pilot-boat Centennial, for New York and New Jersey pilots

On June 24, 1876, the trail trip of the Pilot Boat Centennial, was witnessed by a party of gentlemen. The tug boat J. C. Neattie, towed her down the Boston Harbor and passed the Narrows. Harbor master, Captain Francis C. Cates, took the helm. Robert Crosbie of East Boston, the builder, was on board. The pilot-boat Lillie, was sited and a race began between the two boats. The course of nine miles was from Boston Light to Minot's Ledge Light. The raced was cut short after six miles, when the Lillie, sighted the steamship China and took off for the ship. The boat was owned by Beebe & Hopkins of New York.

The Centennial was registered with the Record of American and Foreign Shipping, from 1877 to 1879, to John Hopkins as master. Her owners were the N. J. Pilots; her hailing port was Jersey City and she was listed as being built in East Boston, Massachusetts. Her dimensions were 76 ft. length on deck; 20.6 ft. breadth of beam; 8.6 ft. depth of hold; and 60-tons burthen. From 1881 to 1884, she was registered with John I. Godby as master; N. J. Pilots as owners, and New York was her hailing port. From 1885 to 1899, Beebe was the master, N. J. Pilots as owners, and New York was her hailing port.

On November 8, 1885, the pilot boat Centennial, No. 7, which was the fastest boat in the fleet, tested her speed with the pilot boat David Carll as she went on her trail trip down the bay. This time, the David Carll, beat the Centennial.

On August 7, 1887, Sandy Hook pilot boat Centennial, No. 7, was on a cruise when it picked up a yawl that was from the pilot boat Phantom, No. 11, two years ago. It was washed overboard during a storm and had been drifting at the ocean bottom. The pilots were able to refurbish the yawl and place it back on the Phantom.

During the Great Blizzard of 1888, the Centennial, No. 13, got caught in ice near the Sandy Hook bar. Along with other pilot boats, the men took cover at a house near the Sandy Hook Lighthouse. Mrs. W. W. Stewart fed the men and allowed them to stay the night.

On June 15, 1889, the pilot boat Centennial, was put up for sale for 25 percent ownership.

On January 29, 1890, pilot Beebe, of New Jersey pilot boat Centennial, No. 7, reported that the seaman Jacob Housen, fell from the bowsprit overboard and was lost off Shinnecook.

The pilot-boat Centennial was listed as a New Jersey pilot boat in 1895, along with the eight New Jersey pilot boats: Thomas S. Negus, No. 1; Elbrige T. Gerry, No. 2; Thomas D. Harrison, No. 3; Friend, No. 4; David T. Leahy, No. 5; James Gordon Bennett, No. 6; Centennial, No. 7; and Edward E. Barrett, No. 8.

== End of service ==
By April 1898, in the age of steam, the Centennial, was the last pilot boat left in the fleet. Then, on September 16, 1898, the pilot boat Centennial, was sold to parties in Montego Bay, Jamaica.

== See also ==
- List of Northeastern U. S. Pilot Boats
