= List of Northeastern U.S. pilot boats =

This is a list of pilot boats for Delaware, New York, New Jersey, Massachusetts and Pennsylvania. Some pilot boats have the same ship number as they may have been replaced with other boats. Ship numbers were used as a ship identifier.

== New York pilot boats ==
Ship No.	Ship name	Image	Captain	Builder	Description
No. 1	Moses H. Grinnell		H. L. Gurney, J. B. Lockman	George Steers	Moses H. Grinnell was a pilot boat built in 1850 for the New York maritime pilots. She was designed by the yacht designer George Steers. The Grinnell was the first pilot boat to feature a fully developed concave clipper-bow, which was to become the New York schooner-rigged pilot boat's trade mark. This new design was the basis for the celebrated yacht America. She was sold to the Pensacola, Florida pilots in 1882.
No. 1	Hope		Thomas Morley	Henry Steers	Hope was a yacht schooner, built in 1861 by Henry Steers for Captain Thomas B. Ives of Providence, Rhode Island. She was acquired by the Union Navy during the American Civil War. She was placed into service as a gunboat assigned to support the fleet blockading the ports of the Confederate States of America. She was a pilot boat from 1866 to 1891. She was lost in 1891 and replaced by the pilot boat Herman Oelrichs,.
No. 1	Herman Oelrichs		Michael Lyons	Moses Adams	Hermann Oelrichs was a Sandy Hook pilot boat, built in 1894 by Moses Adams at Essex, Massachusetts for a group of New York Pilots. The Herman Oelrichs was said to be the fastest of the New York pilot fleet. She was built to replace the pilot boat Hope, that was wrecked in 1890.
No. 2	Edmund Blunt		Josiah Johnson Jr.	Edward F. Williams	Edmund Blunt was a Sandy Hook pilot boat built in 1858 by Edward F. Williams for a group of New York Pilots. She survived the Great Blizzard of 1888. In the age of steam, the Blunt along with other pilot boats, were replaced with steamboats. She was built to replace the pilot boat Jacob L. Westervelt, which sank in 1858.
No. 3	Charles H. Marshall		Josiah Johnson Sr., John J. Canvin Sr.	Henry Steers	Charles H. Marshall, was a Sandy Hook pilot boat built by Henry Steers in 1860 for a group of New York pilots. She was in the Great Blizzard of 1888, the same year the National Geographic came out with an article about the successful struggle made by the crew of the Marshall. The boat was named in honor of the American businessman Charles Henry Marshall. In the age of steam she was sold in 1896.
No. 3	Gratitude	(no picture)	Enon Harris	Brown & Bell	Gratitude, was a Sandy Hook pilot boat built in 1824 by Brown & Bell for New York pilots. She helped transport maritime pilots between inbound or outbound ships coming into the New York Harbor. In 1839, she had a narrow escape from the slave ship La Amistad. In 1839, the Gratitude No. 3, was shipwrecked when a hurricane swept the New York coast.
No. 4	Abraham Leggett		Michael Murphy	Daniel Westervelt	Abraham Leggett, was a New York pilot boat built by Daniel Westervelt at the Westervelt & Co. shipyard. In 1866, Pilot Michael Murphy was on the Leggett, when the bark Emilie, ran into the pilot boat. In 1879, the Leggett, was hit and sank by the steamship Naples, from Liverpool. She was replaced by the Alexander M. Lawrence the same year.
No. 4	David Carll		Edward P. Nichols	David Carll	David Carll, was a pilot boat built in 1885 at the David Carll shipyard in City Island, New York. She was named in honor of David Carll, a well-known City Island shipbuilder. The David Carll, was considered to be among the fastest schooners in the fleet. She was one of the pilot boats that survived the Great Blizzard of 1888. The David Carll was lost at sea in 1893. She was built to replace the Mary E. Fish that was run down and sank by the schooner Frank Harrington in 1885. His brother, Jesse Carll had a successful shipyard in Northport.
No. 4	Alexander M. Lawrence		Michael Murphy, H. B. Cogswell	C. & R. Poillon	Alexander M. Lawrence was the last-century sailing schooners to be in the New York pilot boat service. She was one of the largest and fastest in the Sandy Hook fleet. She was built to replace the pilot-boat Abraham Leggett, that was hit by the steamship Naples in 1879. Her boat model won a medal at the 1893 Chicago World's Fair illustrating the perils of the pilot-boat service. In the age of steam, the Lawrence was sold to the Pacific Mining and Trading Company in 1897.
No. 4	Jacob Bell		Wm. H. Rolston	Jacob Bell	Jacob Bell, was a Sandy Hook pilot boat built by the shipbuilder Jacob Bell for a group of New York Pilots in 1840. She was named in honor of the shipbuilder Jacob Bell, who was a partner in the Brown & Bell firm. After fourteen years of service she went ashore in a gale off Sandy Hook in 1854.
No. 5	Mary Taylor		Richard Brown	Hathorne & Steers	Mary Taylor was a yacht and Sandy Hook pilot boat, built at the Hathorne & Steers shipyard in 1849 for Captain Richard Brown. She was designed by George Steers with a new radical design with a long thin bow and wide stern, which made her faster than any other boat in her class. This design proved successful and led to the famous yacht America, which won the America's Cup in 1851. The Mary Taylor was lost by an American schooner Fairhaven in 1863. She was replaced by the Mary E. Fish No. 4.
No. 5	David Mitchell	(no picture)	Thomas Dexter	John A. Robb	David Mitchell, was a Sandy Hook pilot boat built in 1846, at Baltimore, Maryland for a group of New York Pilots. She was launched at the John A. Robb shipyard in East Baltimore. She was sold to the Pensacola, Florida pilot fleet in 1875.
No. 5	Charlotte Webb		Edward Fryer; Albert C. Malcolm	Webb & Bell	Charlotte Webb was a New York City pilot boat built in 1865 at the Webb & Bell shipyard to take the place of the James Funk, that was destroyed by the rebel Tallahassee during the Civil War. She survived the Great Blizzard of 1888, but was run down by the French steamship La Normandie in 1889.
No. 5	David T. Leahy	(no picture)	Dennis Reardon	C. & R. Poillon	David T. Leahy, was a pilot boat built in 1890 at the C. & R. Poillon shipyard in New York City. She was named in honor of David T. Leahy, a wealthy woolen merchant. She was said to be the fastest boat in the New York and New Jersey fleet. In 1899, the David T. Leahy was renamed the James Gordon Bennett, when the pilots consolidated their business. She sank off Sandy Hook when the German Atlas Line steamship Alene, hit her in 1901.
No. 5	Blossom	(no picture)	James Mitchell, Thomas Freeborn		Blossom, was a Sandy Hook pilot boat built for the New York pilots around 1837. She helped transport maritime pilots between inbound or outbound ships coming into the New York Harbor. In 1839 she came across the Slave ship La Amistad. In 1840 there were only eight New York pilot boats, the Blossom being No. 5. Pilot Thomas Freeborn of the Blossom boarded the packet ship John Minturn and tried to guide the ship in bad weather. He was one of thirty-eight passengers that died near the Jersey Shore in 1846.
No. 5	Favorite		William Carlton Fowler		Favorite or Favorita was a Sandy Hook pilot boat built for a group of New York Pilots. The steamer City of Port au Prince, ran into and sunk the pilot boat Favorite on February 6, 1865. All crew were saved. Captain William C. Fowler joined the pilot service in 1833 on the pilot boat Favorite, under Captain Benjamin Swett, where he stayed for one year.
No. 6	Mary and Catherine	(no picture)	John Taylor, Josiah Johnson Sr.	Jacob Aaron Westervelt	Mary and Catherine, was a New York pilot boat built in 1848 by the Jacob Aaron Westervelt shipyard. She was hit and sank by the steamship Haverton in 1885. The collision became a court case that went as far as the U.S. Supreme Court. The Mary and Catherine was replaced by the pilot boat William H. Starbuck.
No. 6	William H. Starbuck		Jacob M. Heath	J. S. Ellis & Son	William H. Starbuck was a New York pilot boat built to take the place of the Mary and Catherine, that sank in 1885. She was launched from the J. S. Ellis & Son shipyard, at Tottenville, Staten Island in 1886. The Starbuck was one of the few pilot-boats to take the offensive in the Great Blizzard of 1888, when she ran into the steamship Japanese and survived one of the most severe recorded blizzards in American history. She was one of the last pilot boats that were sold in an age of steam and electricity.
No. 6	Thomas H. Smith		Owen Callanan, Theophilus Beebe		Thomas H. Smith, was a Sandy Hook pilot boat built for the New York pilots around 1820. She helped transport maritime pilots between inbound or outbound ships coming into the New York Harbor. In 1840, she was one of only eight pilot boats in the New York fleet. In 1857, she went ashore and sank six miles from Barnegat.
No. 6	Joseph N. Lord		Jarvis P. Calvert	Jabez Williams	Joseph N. Lord, was a Sandy Hook pilot-boat built in 1840 at the Jabez Williams shipyard in East River, for New York pilots. The Joseph N. Lord, was lost at sea in 1845 at Port-au-Platt, Dominican Republic.
No. 7	Sarah Frances	(no picture)	Captain Edwards		Sarah Frances was a New York pilot-boat. She was sixty miles southeast of Sandy Hook, when she boarded a pilot on the bark Ann. Captain Edwards was captain of the bark and spoke about the cholera that was raging in St. Catharines. She went down with all on board in 1853. On January 23, 1852, there is a report that the pilot boat Sarah Francis went ashore on the East Bank. The crew of six were able to rescued.New York Daily Herald. There is also a discussion on the Mariners' Museum and Park about the sloop Frances with a half model by George or Henry Steers.FRANCES, SLOOP.
No. 7	Elwood Walter		Joseph Henderson	Edward F. Williams	Ellwood Walter was a Sandy Hook pilot boat built in 1853 by Edward F. Williams at Greenpoint, Brooklyn, New York. She was replaced by the Edmund Driggs, No. 7, in 1864.
No. 7	Edmund Driggs		William M. Qualey, A. Bourne	Edward F. Williams	Edmund Driggs, was a Sandy Hook pilot boat built in 1864 at the Edward F. Williams shipyard in Greenpoint, Brooklyn. She was built to replace the pilot boat Elwood Walter. The schooner was used to pilot vessels to and from the Port of New York. She survived the Great Blizzard of 1888. In the age of steam, she was sold in 1896.
No. 7	John E. Davidson	(no picture)	Henry J. Bullinger		John E. Davidson was a New York pilot boat. She was reported as early as 1839. In 1840, there were only eight New York pilot boats. They were the Phantom, No. 1; Washington, No. 2; New York, No. 3; Jacob Bell, No. 4; Blossom, No. 5; Thomas H. Smith, No. 6; John E. Davidson, No. 7; and the Virginia, No. 8. On 14 December 1840, Chas. D. Ludlow, of the pilot boat John E. Davidson, along with other pilots from the port of New York, stated that they had never been employed by J. D. Stevenson and no compensation has been offered or demanded.
No. 7	Yankee	(no picture)	William J. Murphy	Holbrook & Adams	Yankee was a Sandy Hook pilot boat built by Holbrook & Adams of Boston in 1848. The schooner was sold to New York pilots and used to pilot vessels to and from the Port of New York. In 1852 the crew of the Yankee received silver medals from the Massachusetts Humane Society for rescuing the captain and mate of the schooner Reaper. The Yankee struck an old wreck and sank 35 miles east of Sandy Hook in 1852. The Ellwood Walter was built to replace her in 1853.
No. 8	Richard K. Fox		George W. Lawler, James M. Dolliver	Dennison J. Lawlor	Richard K. Fox, first named Lillie, was a pilot boat built in 1876 for Boston Pilots. She was designed by model by Dennison J. Lawlor. She was one of the most graceful and attractive of the Boston pilot-boats and represented a trend toward deep-bodied boats. She was later sold to the New York pilots and renamed Richard K. Fox, in honor of the famous sportsman and publisher of the Police Gazette. In the age of steam, she was sold in 1896 to the Marine Hospital Service.
No. 8	Isaac Webb		Augustus Van Pelt, Henry Seguine	Webb & Bell	Isaac Webb was a Sandy Hook pilot boat built in 1860 by Webb & Bell for the New York and Sandy Hook pilots. She received a reward by the Board of Pilot Commissioners of New York for saving three sailors from the wreck of the bark Sarah, that was caught up in a hurricane. The Webb was shipwrecked in a dense fog at Quonochontaug Beach, Long Island in 1879. She was replaced by pilot boat Columbia.
No. 8	Virginia		G. Wright, Walter Brewer		Virginia was a Sandy Hook pilot boat. She came from Savannah to New York City in 1838. In 1840, the Virginia was No. 8 in the list of only eight pilot boats in the New York fleet. She went ashore in 1860 and was replaced by the pilot boat William H. Aspinwall in 1861.
No. 9	James Avery	(no picture)	John Henderson	Jacob Bell	James Avery, was a Sandy Hook pilot boat built in 1837 for a group of New York Pilots. She was built by the shipbuilder Jacob Bell. The James Avery was a pilot boat during the American Civil War that helped in the search of the Confederate CSS Tallahassee. She was last seen in 1872, off the Highlands.
No. 9	Pet		Joseph Henderson, Abel F. Hayden	Edward A. Costigan	Pet was first a Boston pilot-boat built in 1866 by Edward A. Costigan at Charlestown, Boston, Massachusetts, for Pilot Captain Abel F. Hayden. She was in service for a number of years in Boston and later sold to the New York pilots. On 29 August 1872, Captain Joseph Henderson (pilot) purchased the Boston pilot-boat Pet.
No. 10	Jesse Carll		W. H. Anderson	Jesse Carll	Jesse Carll was a pilot boat, built in 1885 by Jesse Carll (shipbuilder) at Northport, New York, for George H. Sisco. She was one of the largest vessels ever built in the Sandy Hook service. She was named in honor of Jesse Carll, a well-known Northport shipbuilder. In 1896, in the age of steam, the Ezra Nye along with other pilot boats, were replaced with steamboats.
No. 10	James M. Waterbury		Thomas Morley		James M. Waterbury was a Sandy Hook pilot boat built in 1843, at Williamsburgh, Brooklyn for a group of New York Pilots. She helped on many of the rescues along the New York Harbor. One of last reports of the Waterbury, was in 1867 when seaman James Roach fell overboard and was drowned off Fire Island.
No. 10	Widgeon		Peter R. Baillie	James R. & George Steers	Widgeon was a yacht and Sandy Hook pilot boat, built in 1855 for Daniel Edgar of the New York Yacht Club and designed by George Steers. She was sold in 1871 to a group of New York pilots to replace the John D. Jones, which sank in a collision with the steamer City of Washington. New York pilots condemned the Widgeon as unseaworthy in 1879, which sparked a fight for steam pilot-boat service. In 1883 a decision was affirmed by the Supreme Court and the Board of Commissioners of Pilots that pilot boats could be "propelled" by steam.
No. 11	E. K. Collins	(no picture)	Robert B. Mitchell, James R. Murphy		E. K. Collins was a Sandy Hook pilot boat built in the early 1840s. She was named for American shipping magnate Edward Knight Collins. During a winter storm, the Collins ran ashore on the outer bar of Fire Island in 1856.
No. 11	George W. Blunt		James Callahan, John Phelan	Daniel Westervelt, Brown & Lovell	George W. Blunt, was Sandy Hook pilot boat built in 1856 by Daniel Westervelt, son of Jacob Aaron Westervelt of the shipyard Westervelt & Co., for a group of New York pilots. She was sold to the United States Navy in 1861, renamed and commissioned as the USS G. W. Blunt (1856), serving in the South Atlantic Blockading Squadron in the South. A second schooner, also named George W. Blunt, was built by Brown & Lovell in East Boston in 1861 to replace the one that was sold.
No. 11	Phantom		R. Yates, John Handran (pilot)	Dennison J. Lawlor	Phantom was a Sandy Hook pilot boat built in 1867 from the designs by Dennison J. Lawlor. The schooner was considered a model for her type with a reputation for being very fast. She helped rescue the passengers on the steamship SS Oregon when it sank in 1886. She was one of the pilot-boats that was lost in the Great Blizzard of 1888. The Phantom was replaced by the pilot-boat William H. Bateman.
No. 11	William H. Bateman		John Handran (pilot)	C. & R. Poillon	William H. Bateman, a.k.a. Commodore Bateman, was a Sandy Hook pilot boat built in 1888 at the C. & R. Poillon shipyard in south Brooklyn. She was replaced the pilot-boat Phantom that was lost in the Great Blizzard of 1888. She was run down and sank by the Hamburg steamship Suevia in 1889.
No. 12	William J. Romer		James McGuire; George H. Sisco	John & James Friend	William J. Romer was a pilot boat built in 1841 for the New York Pilots. She was considered one of the fastest pilot-boats out of New York. In 1846, the Romer sailed across the Atlantic on a special express trip to Liverpool, England. The Romer Shoal Light was named for the Romer, which sank there in 1863.
No. 12	Ariel Patterson		John W. Stanton, John Canvin Sr., John J. Canvin Jr., John Campbell	Ariel Patterson	Ariel Patterson, was a Sandy Hook pilot boat built in 1864 for a group of New York Pilots. She was built by the shipbuilder Ariel Patterson. After nineteen years of service she was struck and sank off Sea Bright, New Jersey, by the steamer Commonwealth, in 1883. She was raised and purchased by the Coast Wreaking Company.
No. 12	Ambrose Snow		Charles Alkens, William Murphy	C. & R. Poillon	Ambrose Snow was a Sandy Hook pilot boat built in 1888 from the C. & R. Poillon shipyard, for a group of New York Pilots. She sank after being struck by the Clyde line freighter Delaware, in 1912. She was raised and reentered pilot service. In 1915, the Ambrose Snow, was one of only five remaining boats patrolling the port of New York. She remained in operation for thirty-seven years.
No. 13	Caldwell H. Colt		Thomas Dougherty	Samuel H. Pine	Caldwell H. Colt was a Sandy Hook pilot boat, built in 1887 at the Samuel H. Pine's shipyard in Greenpoint, Brooklyn, for a group of New York Pilots. She was one of the pilot-boats that was in the Great Blizzard of 1888, that was one of the most severe blizzards in American history. In 1903, she was sold to the Pensacola, Florida pilots.
No. 13	Mary Ann	(no picture)	John Cannon, John Taylor		Mary Ann was a Sandy Hook pilot boat built for the New York pilots. In 1860, the Mary Ann, was one of only twenty-one pilot boats in the New York and New Jersey fleet. She went ashore outside Sandy Hook in 1863.
No. 13	Francis Perkins		T. Aitken, and Vinner	Henry Steers	Francis Perkins was a Sandy Hook pilot boat, built by Henry Steers in 1866 for a group of New York Pilots. She was considered one of the finest boats ever built. During a snow storm in 1887, the Perkins struck the steamship Aries and sank near the Barnegat shoals.
No. 14	Edwin Forrest		John Jeffries, Henry Harbinson	Jacob Aaron Westervelt	Edwin Forrest was a pilot boat built in 1855 by Jacob A. Westervelt's Sons & Co., for a group of New York pilots. She was named in honor of the American actor Edwin Forrest. A second Edwin Forrest was built for Boston pilots in 1865 to replace the New York Edwin Forrest, No. 14, that was lost in 1862. She attained celebrity for her speed and stability. The Edwin Forrest was sold to Pensacola, Florida parties in 1882.
No. 14	Edward F. Williams		George H. Berry	Edward F. Williams	Edward F. Williams was a Sandy Hook pilot boat built in 1863 at the Edward F. Williams shipyard in Greenpoint, Brooklyn for a group of New York pilots. She survived the Great Blizzard of 1888. In the age of steam, the Williams was sold in 1896.
No. 15	Actaea		Keeley	Weld and David Clark	Actaea was a Boston yacht built in 1880 by Weld and David Clark of Kennebunk, Maine, for David Sears Jr. of Montgomery Sears of Boston. She was purchased by a group of New York Sandy Hook Pilots in 1890. She was one of the largest and fastest pilot boats in the fleet. In the age of steam, the Actaea was sold in 1896 to John J. Phelps of the New York Yacht Club and used as a pleasure yacht.
No. 15	John D. Jones		Peter R. Baillie	J.B & J.D. Van Deusen	John D. Jones was a Sandy Hook pilot boat built in 1859 at the J.B & J.D. Van Deusen shipyard in East River for a company of New York Sandy Hook pilots. She was one of the finest vessels of her class. She was replaced by the pilot-boat Widgeon, when the Jones sank in a collision with the steamer City of Washington in 1871.
No. 15	Caprice		George H. Sisco	Brown & Lovell	Caprice, was a Sandy Hook pilot boat built in 1871 by the Brown & Lovell shipyard in East Boston, Massachusetts for Peter McEnany and other New York pilots. In 1876, she was run down and sank, off Bay Ridge, Brooklyn, by the steamship New Orleans. She was raised and was one of the pilot boats that survived the Great Blizzard of 1888. The Caprice was last reported sailing off the coast of New York in 1891.
No. 15	Julia	(no picture)			Julia was a New York pilot boat. The first report of the pilot boat Julia is from The New York Times on 2 Oct 1852, in connection with Moses H. Grinnell and Simeon Draper.The New York Times, New York, New York, 2 Oct 1852, Page 2. On October 19, 1856, the pilot boat Anthony B. Neilson ran into the pilot boat Julia, No. 15, of New York, off the Sandy Hook Light. The Julia broke into two and sank. Her pilots and crew were rescued. There was no light was on the Julia except a small handlamp in the ship's binnacle. The case went to the District court.
No. 16	Christian Bergh		Electus Comfort, Jacob Britton, Josiah Johnson Sr.	Westervelt & Co.	Christian Bergh was a Sandy Hook pilot boat built in 1851 at the Westervelt & Co. shipyard. She later became a Pennsylvania pilot boat until her service ended in 1886 when she became an Oyster boat in the Delaware Bay. She was named after Christian Bergh a prominent shipbuilder in New York and a close friend of Jacob Westervelt.
No. 16	Joseph F. Loubat		Electus Comfort, Frank P. Van Pelt	Jacob S. Ellis	Joseph F. Loubat was a Sandy Hook pilot boat built in 1880 at the Jacob S. Ellis shipyard in Tottenville, Staten Island. She was the largest of the pilot-boats in the Sandy Hook service. In 1896 she was one of the last pilot-boats that were sold in an age of steam and electricity.
No. 17	Fannie		C. H. Wolsey	Edward F. Williams	Fannie was a Sandy Hook pilot boat built in 1860 by Edward F. Williams at his shipyard in Greenpoint, Brooklyn for New York City pilots. She was in the pilot service during the American Civil War. In an age of steam, she was sold in 1896.
No. 18	Enchantress		Daniel V. Jones, T. H. Metcalfe	John Maginn	Enchantress was a Sandy Hook pilot boat built in 1851 by John Maginn who named her after one of the cast in the opera The Enchantress. She was launched from the Westervelt & McKay shipyard. The Enchantress was one of the oldest pilot-boats in the service. She was Cornelius Vanderbilt's favorite pilot boat. The Enchantress went down with all hands in the Great Blizzard of 1888. The pilot boat James Stafford was built to replace her.
No. 18	James Stafford		Pilot C. Peterson		James Stafford was a Sandy Hook pilot boat built in 1888 for the New York pilots. She took the place of the pilot boat Enchantress, that was lost in the Great Blizzard of 1888. She was named after James Stafford, one of the oldest and prominent shipping men of Brooklyn. She sank near Sandy Hook in 1898 when she ran into the Dry Romer shoal. At that time, the Stafford was one of the oldest pilot-boats still in service in a time when they were being replaced with steam pilot boats.
No. 19	Mary A. Williams		H. Burnett	Edward F. Williams	Mary A. Williams was a Sandy Hook pilot boat built in 1861 by the shipbuilder Edward F. Williams in Greenpoint, Brooklyn, for a group of New York pilots. She was named Mary Ann Williams after the wife of the builder. The boat was considered one of the finest connected with the pilot service. She survived the Great Blizzard of 1888. In the age of steam, the Mary A. Williams was sold in 1896.
No. 19	Jacob A. Westervelt		John O’Keefe	Jacob Aaron Westervelt	Jacob A. Westervelt was a Sandy Hook pilot boat designed by naval architect John W. Griffiths and built by Jacob A. Westervelt in 1853. She was one of the fastest pilot-boats in the fleet. In 1858, while attempting to board the British steamer Saxonia she was fatally run into and sank outside of Sandy Hook. The Edmund Blunt, was built to replace her.
No. 20	Nettle		Wm. C. Wood	S. Hall	Nettle was a Sandy Hook pilot boat built in 1844 by S. Hall of East Boston, Massachusetts for the New York Pilots. She helped transport maritime pilots between inbound or outbound ships coming into the New York Harbor. In 1868, she found the wreck of the bark Henry Trowbridge, and towed her to Sandy Hook. The Nettle, sank in 1876 in the Pensacola Bay. The sunken wreck was removed in 1878 to improve the Pensacola harbor.
No. 20	Edward Cooper		Jacob M. Heath	Samuel H. Pine	Edward Cooper was a Sandy Hook pilot boat built in 1879 for New York Pilots in Greenpoint, Brooklyn. She survived the Great Blizzard of 1888. The Edward Cooper was named in honor of the Mayor of New York City. In 1892, she sank in a snowstorm and was replaced by the Joseph Pulitzer in 1894.
No. 20	Joseph Pulitzer		Jacob M. Heath	Moses Adams	Joseph Pulitzer was a Sandy Hook pilot boat built in 1894 at Essex, Massachusetts, for New York Pilots. She was a replacement for the Pilot Boat Edward Cooper, that sank off Sandy Hook in 1892. The Joseph Pulitzer was one of the finest and best equipped boats in the service. She was named in honor of Joseph Pulitzer, a New York newspaper publisher. In 1896, when New York pilot boats were moving to steamboats, she was sold to the Oregon Pilots Association.
No. 21	William H. Aspinwall		Walter Brewer	J. B. Van Dusen Bros.	William H. Aspinwall was a Sandy Hook pilot boat built in 1861 and launched from the J. B. Van Dusen Bros. shipyard at East River for New York Pilots. She was a replacement for the former pilot boat Virginia. In 1880, the Aspinwall was caught in a thick fog and went ashore at the Long Island bar and became a total loss. She was replaced by a new pilot boat, the America, No. 21.
No. 21	America		James Jackson; Edward Develin; Walter Brewer; A. H. Murphy Jr.		America was a pilot boat built in 1880 for the New York City and Sandy Hook Pilots. She was a replacement for the William H. Aspinwall, No. 21, that was lost off Point Judith, Rhode Island in 1880. She weathered the Great Blizzard of 1888. In the time of steam, the America was sold in 1896 by the New York Pilots. A new pilot-boat America was built in 1897 for Captain James H. Reid of Boston and designed from the line drawings by Thomas F. McManus of Boston. After serving 21 years in the Boston Pilots' Association, the America was sold to David W. Simpson of Boston in 1918.
No. 21	Anthony B. Neilson		John F. Clark	George Steers	Anthony B. Neilson was a Sandy Hook pilot boat built in 1854 by George Steers for a company of New York Sandy Hook pilots. She was considered to be the fastest boat in the piloting business. She helped transport New York City Maritime pilot pilots between inbound or outbound ships coming into the New York Harbor. She survived the Great Blizzard of 1888. In 1859, the Neilson was sold to a group of New Orleans pilots. The New York pilots then replaced the Neilson, with a new pilot boat, the John D. Jones.
No. 22	James Funk		Robert Yates, Captain William Smith		James Funk was a New York City pilot boat built in 1862 at Greenpoint, Brooklyn for a company of New York Pilots. She was built for speed. She was assigned the "Number 22," which was displayed on her mainsail. The James Funk was captured and burned by the Confederate raiding steamer CSS Tallahassee during the American Civil War. The Charlotte Webb was built in 1865 to take the place of the James Funk that was destroyed.
No. 22	Washington		T. Murray; Michael Murphy	C. & R. Poillon	Washington was a Sandy Hook pilot boat built in 1845 for New York Pilots. She was rebuilt several times, the last with the sail number "22" painted on her mainsail. In 1884, she was sunk by the German steamship Roma, and then replaced by a new Washington.
No. 23	Josiah Johnson	(no picture)	Josiah Johnson Sr.	Josiah Johnson Sr.	Josiah Johnson was a Sandy Hook pilot boat built in the early 1840s by Sandy Hook pilot Josiah Johnson Sr. She was named after the builder. The Josiah Johnson was struck down by the schooner Wanata off of Barnegat and sank in 1869. This resulted in a collision case to recover damages that went to the District Court. The court found that the Wanata was at fault for not keeping a lookout.
No. 24	William Bell		Joseph Henderson, William H. Anderson, John Van Dusen, James Callahan	Edward F. Williams	William Bell was a pilot boat built in 1863 by shipbuilder Edward F. Williams at Greenpoint, Brooklyn for a group Sandy Hook Pilots. She was captured and burned by the Confederate raiding steamer CSS Tallahassee during the American Civil War. A second William Bell was constructed in 1864–1865 to replace the first one.

== Boston pilot boats ==
Ship No.	Ship name	Image	Captain	Builder	Description
No. 1	America		James H. Reid Sr.		America, No. 1 was an American pilot boat built in 1897 for Captain James H. Reid Sr. of Boston and designed by Boston designer Thomas F. McManus. The Boston America did not resemble her famous namesake, yacht America, rather she was designed with a fishing schooner "Indian header" bow. After serving 21 years in the Boston Pilots' Association, the America was sold to David W. Simpson of Boston in 1918.
No. 1	Syren	(no picture)	Tewkesbury		Syren, No. 1, was a Boston pilot boat built before 1859.
No. 1	Pilot		William H. Lewis		Pilot, was a pilot boat built in 1924 and designed by yacht designer William Starling Burgess. She was purchased by the Boston Pilots' Association to take the place of the pilot boat Louise that was withdrawn from service in 1924. The Pilot was in service for over fifty years before she was sold in 1976. She became the longest-serving pilot boat in American history.
No. 1	Gracie		Abel F. Hayden	Edward A. Costigan	The Boston pilot boat Gracie was built by Edward A. Costigan in 1869. She was listed in the Record of American and Foreign Shipping from 1881 to 1898. Her ship master was Captain Abel F. Hayden; her owner was C. A. Hayden; built in 1869 at Charlestown, Massachusetts; and her hailing port was the Port of Boston. In 1886, her port changed to Wilmington, North Carolina. Her dimensions were 65.2 ft. in length; 19.2 ft. breadth of beam; 6.8 ft. depth of hold; and 40-tons Tonnage.
No. 2	Eben D. Jordan		Thomas Cooper, John Henry Low	Ambrose A. Martin	Eben D. Jordan was a Boston pilot boat built in 1883 by Ambrose A. Martin in East Boston for Captain Thomas Cooper. Her namesake was Eben Dyer Jordan, the founder of the Jordan Marsh department stores. In 1892, she was sold to the New York Sandy Hook pilots. She was one of the last of the pilot-boats that were discarded in an age of steam and electricity in 1896.
No. 2	Edwin Booth	(no picture)	Thomas Cooper		Edwin Booth was a Boston pilot boat. Thomas Cooper served as first boat-keeper of the new pilot boat Edwin Booth, of which he had become a part owner, for fifteen months, and was granted a warrant commission as pilot of the port of Boston on May 8, 1868. On July 14, 1882, after many successful years of service, the Edwin Booth, No. 2, was sold to Pensacola, Florida parties for $5,000 and a new larger boat, the Eben D. Jordan was built by Cooper to take her place.
No. 2	Louise		Watson S. Dolliver, John C. Fawcett	Ambrose A. Martin	Louise was built as a pilot boat in 1900 by Ambrose A. Martin at East Boston, Massachusetts. She was also a United States Navy patrol vessel in commission from 1917 to 1919 and a pilot boat from 1900 to 1917. She was a replacement for the pilot boat Columbia, that was washed ashore in 1898. After the World War I the Louise returned to pilot service until 1924 when she was purchased as a yacht. In 1924, the Boston pilot boat Pilot, took the place of the Louise.
No. 2	Roseway		World Ocean School		Roseway is a wooden schooner launched in 1925 in Essex, Massachusetts for Harold Hathaway. She is currently operated by World Ocean School, a non-profit educational organization based in Camden, Maine, and is normally operated out of Boston, Massachusetts and Saint Croix, U.S. Virgin Islands. In 1941, Roseway was purchased by the Boston Pilot's Association to serve as a pilot boat for Boston Harbor, as a replacement for the pilot-boat Northern Light, which was sold to the United States Army for war service.
No. 3	Northern Light		William P. Winchester	Whitmore & Holbrook	Northern Light was a yacht built in 1839 at the Whitemore & Holbrook shipyard for Colonel William P. Winchester, a Boston merchant. She was designed by Louis Winde, an early yacht designer and shipbuilder. She sank en route to California in 1850. A second Northern Light, was built in 1927 and bought by the Boston Pilots' Association to serve as a pilot-boat from 1934 to 1941. She was sold to the United States Army in 1941 to serve in the war effort during World War II. The Roseway was a replacement for the Northern Light when she was sold.
No. 3	D. J. Lawlor		Abel F. Hayden		D. J. Lawlor was a Boston pilot boat built in 1881 at North Weymouth, Massachusetts. The schooner was considered the largest (86 feet) for her type, noted for her seaworthiness and heavy weather performance. She was named after the prominent Boston shipbuilder Dennison J. Lawlor. She was struck by a fishing schooner Horace B. Parker, in 1895, and was replaced by the pilot-boat Liberty in 1896.
No. 3	Liberty		John H. Low, Bruce B. McLean, Watson S. Dolliver	John Bishop	Liberty, was a Boston pilot-boat built in 1896 by John Bishop shipyard in Gloucester, Massachusetts. She was a replacement for the pilot boat D. J. Lawlor. On September 10, 1917, the United States Navy acquired her under a free lease from the Boston Pilots Relief Society, for use as a section patrol boat during World War I. After World War I, the Liberty returned to pilot service until 1934 when she was purchased as a yacht.
No. 3	George Peabody		Samuel Henry Burtis	Boston shipyard	George Peabody was a 19th-century pilot boat built in Boston, Massachusetts in 1867, for San Francisco pilots. She was in the San Francisco pilot service for twenty-seven years. The Peabody was sold in 1893 to Captain Samuel H. Burtis and sailed to Yokohama, Japan for fishing and Seal hunting. In March 1895, she went ashore off the coast of Japan while working in the sealing trade.
No. 4	Bouquet	(no picture)			Bouquet was a Boston pilot boat. She was No. 4 and built after 1859.
No. 4	Adams		John H. Jeffries	Moses Adams	Adams was a Boston pilot boat, built in 1888 by Moses Adams at Essex, Massachusetts for Captain John H. Jeffries. She was named for Melvin O. Adams, an American attorney and railroad executive. Her design was by yacht designer Edward Burgess, known for his America's Cup defenders. In 1901, she was sold and landed in the Portuguese immigrant trade. She was sunk by enemy action during World War I.
No. 4	Edwin Forrest		John Low	Dennison J. Lawlor's	Edwin Forrest was a new Boston pilot-boat that was launched in 1865 from the Dennison J. Lawlor's stone-lined slip at Buck's Wharf in Chelsea, Massachusetts. Lawlor designed and built the Edwin Forrest to replace the Edwin Forest, No. 14, of New York, that was lost on Long Island in 1862.
No. 4	George H. Warren		William Murphy	Porter Keene	George H. Warren was a pilot boat built in 1882 by Porter Keene at Weymouth, Massachusetts, to replace the Edwin Forrest, No. 4, which was sold to the Pensacola, Florida pilots. The George H. Warren, originally belonged to the Boston pilot fleet but in 1889, she was purchase by a group of New York pilots. She and her crew were lost in the great blizzard of 1895.
No. 5	Hesper		George W. Lawler, Augustus Hooper, James L. Smith	Montgomery & Howard	Hesper was a pilot boat built in 1884 by and built by Montgomery & Howard. She was designed from a model by Dennison J. Lawlor as a Boston yacht and pilot-boat for merchant and ship owner George W. Lawler. She was known to be the largest pilot boat under the American flag at 104 feet long and the fastest of the Boston fleet. She competed in several first-class sailing races, and in 1886, the Hesper won the silver cup in what was known as the first Fishermen's Race. She was sold out of the Boston pilot service in 1901.
No. 6	Varuna		Thomas Cooper, James L. Smith	Montgomery & Howard	Varuna was a Boston pilot boat, built by and built by Montgomery & Howard at Chelsea, Massachusetts in 1890, for a group of Boston pilots. She was designed by yacht designer Edward Burgess, known for his America's Cup defenders. She was the first centerboard pilot-boat in operation in the Massachusetts Bay. The Varuna went out of service in 1912 because of the introduction of steam power into pilot-boats. The Varuna was later sold to Stephen Simmons to be used as a trading vessel between ports in the Spanish Main in 1913.
No. 6	Florence		William C. Fowler, Franklin Fowler	Dennison J. Lawlor	Florence was a Boston pilot boat built in 1867 from a model by Dennison J. Lawlor for William C. Fowler. The vessel had a reputation for being fast under sail. She had a long career in the Boston service, skippered by many famous pilots. She was the oldest pilot-boat in the service. In 1897, she was sold to a Portland, Maine group for fishing and yachting excursions. The pilot boat America, No. 1, was launched on April 19, 1897, to replace the Florence.
No. 6	William Starkey		Abel F. Hayden	Thatcher Magoun	The William Starkey was a 19th-century pilot boat built in 1854, by Benjamin F. Delano at the Thatcher Magoun shipyard for W. W. Goddard, of Boston. Starkey helped transport Boston maritime pilots between inbound or outbound ships coming into the Boston Harbor. She was named for Captain William Starkey, one of the founders of the Boston Marine Society. The Virginia Pilots' Association purchased the Boston schooner William Starkey in 1865, where became a pioneer of the associations' fleet and the oldest pilot boat on the Atlantic and Gulf coasts. In the age steam, she was sold in 1899 to Thomas Darling of Hampton, Virginia.
No. 6	Coquette		Samuel Colby	Louis Winde	Coquette was a yacht and pilot boat built in 1845 by Louis Winde, at the Winde & Clinkard shipyard in Chelsea, Massachusetts for yachtsmen James A. Perkins. Her design was based on a model by shipbuilder Dennison J. Lawlor. The Coquette was a good example of an early American yacht with a clipper bow. As a yacht, she won the attention for outsailing the larger New York yacht Maria at the second New York Yacht Club regatta in 1846. Perkins sold the Coquette to the Boston Pilots' Association for pilot service in 1848. She continued as a pilot boat until 1867 when she was sold as a Blackbirder to be used on the African coast.
No. 7	Minerva		Bruce B. McLean, Watson Shields Dolliver	Ambrose A. Martin	Minerva was a Boston pilot boat built in 1896 by Ambrose A. Martin of East Boston, Massachusetts. She was owned by Franklin B. Wellock who was a Boston pilot for more than 55 years. The pilot-boat was named for his daughter, Minerva Hill. She was sold to Plymouth parties in 1901 to be used as a fishing vessel.
No. 7	Fleur de Lis		Franklin B. Wellock	J.B & J.D. Van Deusen	The Fleur de Lis was a yacht and pilot boat built in 1865 by J. B. Van Deusen for Captain John S. Dickerson of the New York Yacht Club. She was bought by pilot Franklin B. Wellock and became the Boston pilot boat No. 7. She was known as one of the best pilot boats in the Boston Harbor. By 1904, the pilot boat Fleur de Lis was lying in a graveyard for old boats in East Boston.
No. 7	Friend		Thomas Cooper, William R. Lampee	Daniel D. Kelley & Holmes	The Friend was a pilot boat built by Daniel D. Kelley & Holmes East Boston shipyard in 1848 for Boston pilots. The Friend was one of the last of the low sided, straight sheared schooners built in the 1840s for Boston pilots. The second Boston pilot boat Friend was built in 1887. Her name came from the older Friend that was in the service in the late 1840s. Captain Thomas Cooper sold the Friend to New York pilots in 1893. Cooper replaced the Friend with the pilot-boat Columbia in 1894.
No. 7	Louisa Jane	(no picture)	James M. Dolliver		The Louisa Jane was an 86-ton Boston pilot boat. She was No. 7 in the Boston fleet. She was run into and sunk by the steamer Forest City on December 19, 1873. She was raised by Captain Moses B. Tower and towed to Bird Island flats, where the water was pumped out and she was taken to her dock.The Boston Globe Boston, Massachusetts, 19 Dec 1873, Page 8. On November 28, 1876, during a storm, the pilot-boat Louisa Jane, No. 7, was anchored in the Plymouth outer harbor. She broke away at night and went ashore on the flats. James M. Dolliver was able to get her floated and sailed to the town dock without damage. The pilot boat Louisa Jane went on auction on August 16, 1880, by George M. Attwood, general auctioneer and appriaiser.Boston Post, Boston, Massachusetts, 14 Aug 1880, Page 3. On August 23, 1884, the pilot boat Louisa Jane, No. 5, when she went ashore on the rocks. Her pilot, Captain James M. Dolliver, got her afloat and a tug boat brought them back to Boston for repairs.
No. 8	Columbia		Augustus Van Pelt, Thomas Cooper, John C. Fawcett, Henry Seguine, Daniel V. Jones	C. & R. Poillon	Columbia was a pilot boat built in 1879 by C. & R. Poillon shipyard for Sandy Hook and New York pilots that owned the Isaac Webb, which was lost off Quonochontaug Beach, Long Island in July 1879. She was run down by the Guion Line steamer SS Alaska in 1883. A second pilot-boat, also named Columbia, was built by Ambrose A. Martin at East Boston in 1894 that had a unique sppon bow and was extremely fast. She was thrown ashore in the great Portland Gale, and remained on the Sand Hills beach in Scituate, Massachusetts for over thirty years as a marine curiosity. The Louise No. 2 replaced the ill-fated Columbia.
No. 8	Sylph		Joseph W. Colby	Whitmore & Holbrook	Sylph was a pilot boat first built in 1834, by Whitmore & Holbrook for John Perkins Cushing as a Boston yacht and pilot-boat for merchant and ship owner Robert Bennet Forbes. She won the first recorded American yacht race in 1835. She was a pilot boat in the Boston Harbor in 1836 and 1837 and sold to the New York and Sandy Hook Pilots in October 1837. She was lost in winter of 1851 with all hands during a blizzard off Barnegat, New Jersey. The second Sylph was built in 1865 from a half-model by Dennison J. Lawlor. The third Sylph was built in 1878 at North Weymouth, Massachusetts for Boston Pilots. She was sold out of service in 1901, after 23 years of Boston pilot service.
No.	Caleb Curtis		Boston and San Francisco pilots	Built in Chelsea, Massachusetts	The Caleb Curtis was a two-masted Boston pilot boat, built in 1859 at Chelsea, Massachusetts for Boston maritime pilots. She well known for her speed. the Curtis was sold to the San Francisco Pilots' Opposition Line in October 1861 and sailed from Boston around Cape Horn and then to San Francisco to become a pilot boat with the San Francisco fleet. She was shipwrecked inside the Bonita Channel in 1867. The Caleb Curtis was repaired, and was able to continue as a pilot boat in San Francisco from 1867 to 1892. She was sold at auction 1892. From 1892 to 1899, she had different owners and sailed the waters of Japan, Socorro Island, Clipperton Island and Tahiti, Hong Kong and Klondike, Yukon. She was shipwrecked at Cape Nome, Alaska in 1899.

== New Jersey pilot boats ==
Ship No.	Ship name	Image	Captain	Builder	Description
No. 1	Jane	(no picture)			Jane was a two-masted New Jersey pilot boat. An early report of the Jane was on January 30, 1851, when she saved the crew of the bark Carlos struck Egg Rock, outside the lower light, and filled with water. She went ashore and sank during a dense fog on the West Bank between Swinburne Island and Hoffman Island on April 3, 1873.
No. 1	Thomas S. Negus		Joseph McClurek, William Lewis	C. & R. Poillon	Thomas S. Negus was a two-masted Sandy Hook pilot boat, built by C. & R. Poillon shipyard in Brooklyn in 1873 for the New Jersey maritime pilots. She was built to replace the pilot boat Jane, No. 1, which was in 1872. She was the winner of a $1,000 prize at the Cape May Regatta in 1873. She was named for Thomas S. Negus, president of the N. J. Pilots' Commissioners. In 1897, she left the pilot service to prospect for gold during the Klondike Gold Rush.
No. 2	Ezra Nye		Benjamin J. Guinness	Wells & Webb	Ezra Nye was a pilot boat built in 1859 by the Wells & Webb shipyard in Greenpoint, Brooklyn for a group of New Jersey and Sandy Hook Pilots. She was one of the pilot-boats that was in the Great Blizzard of 1888, that was one of the most severe blizzards in American history. In 1896, in the age of steam, the Ezra Nye along with other pilot boats, were replaced with steamboats.
No. 2	Elbridge T. Gerry		William K. Nickerson, Frederick T. Horton	Robinson & Waterhouse	Elbridge T. Gerry was a New York Sandy Hook pilot boat built in 1888 at the Robinson & Waterhouse shipyard in City Island, Bronx. She was named in honor of Elbridge Thomas Gerry, a commodore of the New York Yacht Club. She served as a pilot boat from 1888 to 1896, when she was sold for offshore yachting cruises. Her name was changed to Kwasind, after the strongman in Henry Wadsworth Longfellow's Song of Hiawatha. On December 13, 1896, the 60-ton New York pilot boat Elbridge T. Gerry was purchased by Edgar Harding of Boston and went to Lawley's shipyard to be fitted for offshore yachting cruises.
No. 3	Thomas D. Harrison		Thomas Dexter, Stephen Cooper	Jacob S. Ellis	Thomas D. Harrison was a New York pilot boat built for New Jersey pilots. She was launched from the Jacob S. Ellis & Son shipyard, at Tottenville, Staten Island in 1875. The Harrison went ashore in the Great Blizzard of 1888 with no lives lost. She continued as a pilot boat with Pilot Stephen Cooper in command. She was purchased in 1897 by Allerton D. Hitch and used for coastal trade in the Cape Verde islands off the west African coast.
No. 3	Commerce		McNight Smith		Commerce was a New Jersey Pilot Boat from Norfolk, that belonged to the New Jersey and Sandy Hook Pilots in 1840. On 7 February 1845, the Commerce, while on pilot duty, went ashore near Elm Tree, and bilged. On 24 January 1853, the pilot boat Commerce was reported lost on the New Jersey coast in a gale, having on board four pilots: McKnight Smith, Mathew M. Betts, Thomas Scott, and Nelson Cole; one apprentice Thomas Smith (son of McKnight Smith), and a crew of five hands: Roger Clark, boat keeper; a cook; and three men. The pilot-boat Nettle was the last boat to see her off Egg Harbor, New Jersey.
No. 4	Mary E. Fish	(no picture)	Richard Brown	Edward F. Williams	Mary E. Fish, No. 4, was a pilot boat, that was built in 1861 at the Edward F. Williams shipyaard of Greenpoint, Brooklyn for Richard Brown and the New York Pilots. She was built to replace the New York pilot boat Mary Taylor, No. 5. In 1874, the Mary E. Fish was listed with the New Jersey Pilots and Richard Brown as her captain. The Mary E. Fish was hit and sank by the schooner Frank Harrington in 1885 and replaced by the New York pilot boat David Carll, No. 4.
No. 4	Trenton		Charles O. Beebe		Trenton was an auxiliary motor pilot boat built in Essex County, Massachusetts for a company of New Jersey Sandy Hook pilots in 1907. She was formerly the fishing schooner Kernwood, designed by Thomas F. McManus of Boston in 1904. As a pilot boat, she spent twenty-five years in pilot service before being placed out of service in 1934.
No. 5	W. W. Story		Jerry Reardon, Alexander Cochrane	Samuel H. Pine	W. W. Story was a wood pilot boat launched on October 2, 1874, from Samuel H. Pine shipyard at the foot of Java Street, Greenpoint, New York. Conley, Cisco & Cumskey were owners. She was 77 feet, 2 inches in length; 21 feet breadth of beam; 7 feet 10 inches depth of hold; 71.9 and 70.3 feet height of main mast and foremast and 52-tons.
No. 6	George Steers		New Jersey Pilots		George Steers was a pilot boat built in 1852 for the New Jersey Pilots' Association. She was designed by the yacht designer George Steers and considered to be one of the fastest boat sailing. She had a popular shorter bow overhang, similar to the celebrated yacht America She was driven ashore on the South Shoals near Barnegat Island in 1865. The pilot-boat A. T. Stewart, was built to replace the George Steers.
No. 6	A. T. Stewart	(no picture)	New Jersey Pilots	Edward F. Williams	A. T. Stewart was a Sandy Hook pilot boat built in 1865 at the Edward F. Williams shipyard to replace the pilot boat George Steers, which was lost in 1865. She was built for the New Jersey and New York Pilots' Association. The Stewart was in a collision with the steamship Scotia and sank in 1869. She was replaced by the James Gordon Bennett in 1870.
No. 7	James Gordon Bennett	(no picture)	Daniel C. Chapman; Jas. F. Brown	Lawrence & Foulks	James Gordon Bennett was a pilot boat built in 1870 at the Lawrence & Foulks shipyard. She was named in honor of James Gordon Bennett Jr., publisher of the New York Herald. She went ashore in 1893 and was rebuilt at the C. & R. Poillon shipyard. In 1897, the Bennett was bought by Miller J. Morse of the Atlantic Yacht Club and made into a yacht. He changed her name to Hermit. The New Jersey pilots purchased her in 1901, to replace the David T. Leahy, that was run down by the steamship Alene. The Hermit sank in 1906, when the steamship Monterey ran into her.
No. 7	Centennial		John Hopkins	Robert Crosbie	Centennial was a pilot boat built in 1876 by Robert Crosbie and designed by Boston designer Dennison J. Lawlor for New York and New Jersey pilots. She was one of the pilot-boats that survived the Great Blizzard of 1888. By 1898, in the age of steam, she was the last pilot boat left in the fleet; then sold in 1898 to a group in Montego Bay, Jamaica.
No. 7	James W. Elwell	(no picture)	Charles E. Warner	John A. Forsyth	James W. Elwell was a two-masted Sandy Hook pilot boat, built in 1867 by John A. Forsyth at Mystic Bridge, New London, Connecticut for New Jersey and Sandy Hook maritime pilots. She raced for a $1,000 prize at the Cape May Regatta in 1873. She went ashore and was shipwrecked on North Beach Haven, New Jersey in 1875.
No. 8	Edward E. Barrett		Captain W. W. Black	C. & R. Poillon	Edward E. Barrett was a two-masted Sandy Hook pilot boat, built by C. & R. Poillon in 1883 and designed by William Townsend. She was one of the pilot boats that survived the Great Blizzard of 1888. On October 31, 1893, the Edward E. Barrett was listed as one of eight New Jersey Sandy Hook pilot boats. In the age of steam, the Barrett ended her pilot commission and was sold in 1904.
No.	John McKean		New Jersey pilots	Webb & Allen	John McKeon was a 19th-century New Jersey pilot boat built in 1938 by Webb & Allen for the New Jersey Pilots Association. She helped transport maritime pilots between inbound or outbound ships coming into the New York Harbor. Her short career ended in 1839, when the John McKeon was shipwrecked in a hurricane that swept the New York coast. The pilot boat Gratitude was lost in the same storm.

== Delaware pilot boats ==
Ship No.	Ship name	Image	Captain	Builder	Description
No.	New Kit or Little Kitty	(no picture)	David Johnson, Silas Miles	(no builder)	The pilot boat New Kit was lost at sea in 1816 with two pilots and all her crew.
No.	Matthew L. Bivan	(no picture)	George Mariner, Samuel Rowland, Nathaniel Harris, James Harris, John Gunnue, Arthur Painter	(no builder)	The pilot boat Matthew L. Bivan was lost at sea in 1819 with all hands.
No.	Oscar B. Davis	(no picture)	Richard Westley Sr. sons George, John and Samuel Westley, Thomas Virden, Samuel Marshall, John Dougherty	(no builder)	The pilot boat Oscar B. Davis was lost in the gale of September 1821 on the Hens and Chickens Shoal.
No.	Louisiana	(no picture)	Joseph West, Thomas Saunders, John Thompson	(no builder)	The pilot boat Louisiana was lost in the gale in June 1825.
No.	Henry F. Mierken	(no picture)	William Brown	(builder)	The pilot boat Henry F. Mierken was lost on Plum Point shoal on March 10, 1847, five miles above Lewes.
No.	Henry C. Cope	(no picture)	(pilots)	(builder)	The pilot boat Henry C. Cope was
No. 1	Thomas Howard		James A. Orton	William Cramp & Sons	Thomas Howard was a pilot schooner built in 1870, at the William Cramp & Sons shipyard in Philadelphia for the Delaware Bay maritime pilots. She had a long career in the pilot boat service. Pilot James A. Orton, in 1880, kept a journal of the daily life aboard the Howard.
2	Thomas F. Bayard		Delaware Pilots	C. & R. Poillon	Thomas F. Bayard was a pilot schooner built in 1880, at the C. & R. Poillon shipyard in Brooklyn, New York, for the Delaware Bay pilots. She was 86-ft long and 70-tons. She was named for Thomas F. Bayard an early Delaware politician and diplomat from Wilmington, Delaware. The Thomas F. Bayard No. 2, was one of the last schooners in Delaware Bay service.
No. 4	Ebe W. Tunnell		Captain A. W. Marshall Sr. Captain James K. Rowland	C. & R. Poillon	Ebe W. Tunnell was a 19th-century Delaware pilot schooner built in 1887 in Brooklyn, New York. In 1889, the Tunnell was driven out to sea in a fierce storm. The crew spent five days in turbulent waters before they were rescued. In the age of steam, Ebe W. Tunnell had outlived its usefulness and was sold as a houseboat for a group of men working in the Chesapeake Bay in 1909.

== Pennsylvania pilot boats ==
Ship No.	Ship name	Image	Captain	Builder	Description
No.	Enoch Turley	(no picture)	John Kelley, Luster D. Schallinger, James Clampett, William Edwards, Joseph Snodgrass, James A. Orton	Jackson & Sharp	The Enoch Turley was a Pennsylvania pilot schooner built in 1842 in Baltimore, Maryland. In the 1880s she was caught up in the competition and rivalry between New Jersey and Pennsylvania pilots and the Delaware pilots. She survived the Great Blizzard of 1888, but was swept away in 1889, with all hands lost, during a powerful gale.
No. 1	William W. Ker	(available at "Pilots" reference)	Philadelphia Pilots	Jackson & Sharp Company	The William W. Ker was a 19th-century Pennsylvania pilot schooner built in 1889 in Wilmington, Delaware. She was designed by Edward Burgess for the Pennsylvania pilots and was built for speed. She was a favorite with the pilots and was considered the fastest pilot boat on the coast. The Ker was hit and sank by a steamer off the Five Fathom Bank in 1900.
No. 2	Edward C. Knight		Ellis Eldridge	C. & R. Poillon	Edward C. Knight, was a pilot boat built by the C. & R. Poillon shipyard in 1875 for Delaware River Pilots. She was the finest and fastest pilot-boat belonging to the Philadelphia port. She was sold to the Brunswick Pilots' Association of Georgia in 1898.
No.	Whilldin		Humphrey Hughes	Joseph Vogle shipyard	The Whilldin was a pilot-boat was launched on August 1, 1839, from the shipyard of Joseph Vogle, from Southwark, Philadelphia. She sailed from Cap May, New Jersey. She was named after Dr. Whilldin, son of Captain Willdin of Philadelphia. Humphrey Hughes was the pilot when it was capsized on November 29, 1870. The pilot boats Whilldin and Henry Cope worked off the Delaware capes. The Delaware pilots had only the Henry Cope and the Thomas F. Bayard, while the Pennsylvania and New Jersey competitors have the Whilldin, C. K. Knight, Howard, Christian Bergh, and Enoch Turley.
No. 3	J. Henry Edmunds		Philadelphia Pilots	C. & R. Poillon	J. Henry Edmunds was a 19th-century pilot boat schooner built in 1887 in Brooklyn, New York for Philadelphia pilots. She sank in 1892 and a second Edmunds was built in 1893, which lasted thirty-five years before she sank in bad weather outside Cape Henlopen in 1928. She was the last schooner-rigged pilot boat in the Delaware Bay.
No.	Philadelphia aka Peoria		Philadelphia & Delaware Pilots	Neafie & Levy	In 1896, pilots pooled their resources and commissioned the Neafie & Levy Ship and Engine building company in Philadelphia, Pennsylvania to build the steel steam pilot boat Philadelphia, which was the first Pilot station five miles outside the cape. She was renamed Peoria, when she was purchased by the US Navy on 23 May 1898 and converted to a gunboat with Lt. Thomas W. Ryan in command.

== Not identified with sail boat number ==
Ship name	Image	Captain	Builder	Description
Charlotte Ann	(no image)	n/a	n/a	Charlotte Ann was a New York pilot boat. One of the first reports on the Charlotte Ann was on December 13, 1842, when the pilot boat came up from the Sandy Hook with weather conditions of snow. On June 8, 1845, John W. Avery of John W. Avery & Co., 309 Water Street, put an ad in the New York Daily Herald to sale the fast sailing pilot boat Charlotte Ann. She was 50-tons burthen. One of the last reports of the Charlotte Ann was on February 9, 1849, when she helped tow the brig Cobden, Cornish, Hamburg, in heavy weather to the city.
Dancing Feather	(no picture)	James L. Fowler	Dennison J. Lawlor	Dancing Feather was a pilot boat built in 1853 at the Dennison J. Lawlor shipyard in East Boston, Massachusetts. She went to San Francisco in 1853. The Dancing Feather met up with the wreck SS Yankee Blade in 1854 and was able to raise four boxes of treasure from the sunken vessel. In 1857, she went ashore on the beach north of Point Bonita in San Francisco Bay.
Daniel Webster		William Robinson Lampee; Thomas Cooper		Daniel Webster was a Boston pilot-boat built in 1851 at Chelsea, Massachusetts. She left for San Francisco when she sailed for Shanghai, China, in 1865 to become a pilot boat in 1886. The Daniel Webster operated until 1892 when she was lost in a storm. All pilots were rescued.
Frolic	(no picture)		Daniel Hall	Frolic was a Boston pilot-boat built at East Boston by Daniel Hall on June 1, 1843, for the same company of pilots who owned the boat Belle. She was 70 feet in length on deck, 18.10 beam, 7.10 depth of hold, and drew 9 feet aft and 6 feet forward. She had a 66-foot foremast and a 68-foot mainmast. She was 90-tons measurement. Her cabin is fitted with 12 cabin beds.
Eye	(no picture)	Vaughan		Eye was a Baltimore pilot boat that met with Baltimore pilot boat Mary Ellen off Chincotrague. The Mary Ellen came 3 lengths ahead of the Eye.First Cruise, May 1845.
Independence (Flying Fish)		Charles Wilkes	Jabex & Williams	The Independence was built as a civilian schooner-rigged pilot boat built on March 11, 1837, by Jabex & Williams shipyard. She was purchased by the US Navy on 3 August 1838 and renamed Flying Fish. She was purchased by the United States Navy on 3 August 1838 and renamed Flying Fish.
Mary Eleanor	(no image)	Josiah Johnson Sr.		Mary Eleanor was a New York pilot boat. On February 17, 1846, the Mary Eleanor was run ashore near on Shrewsbury beach but not injured. Captain Josiah Johnson Sr. thanked the people of Shrewsbury for saving all the property belonging to the boat.
Savannah	(no image)	William F. Allen		Savannah was a New Jersey pilot boat. New Jersey pilot William F. Allen was on the Savannah when he was lost overboard during a heavy gale. She was replaced by the Wm. G. Hackstaff.
William G. Hagstaff	(no picture)	Captain Richard Brown	George Steers	The New Jersey pilot boat William G. Hagstaff was designed by George Steers and built on 17 Apr 1844 Hathorn & Steers shipyard in Williamsburg, Brooklyn for New Jersey Pilots. It was his first pilot boat. She was a replacement for the pilot boat Savannah, that was lost. On August 10, 1849, the Hagstaff's owner sailed her to the West Coast to establish a pilotage business at the mouth of the Columbia River. She was one of twenty vessels from Boston, New York and Baltimore that arrived in Benicia, California. However, she was grounded on a bar in the Rogue River. She was then attacked, robbed and burned by the local Tututni Indians. Captain Richard Brown had served aboard the William G. Hagstaff.
Jabez Williams	(no picture)		Jabez & Williams	Jabez Williams was a New York Sandy Hook pilot boat launched 1 March 1850 and owned by the Association of Pilots. She was 90-tons burden, 64 feet long, 19.5 beam, and 7.5 hold. She was launched from the Jabez & Williams shipyard. J. Williams & Co., New York Tribune, May 1850
New York		James E. McCarthy Jr.	Harlan and Hollingsworth	New York was the first steam pilot boat in the New York Harbor. She was built in 1897 by the Harlan and Hollingsworth Company at Wilmington, Delaware and for the a group of New York Sandy Hook pilots. She was designed by Archibald Cary Smith, who was a prominent naval architect and marine engineer. The New York was retired from pilot service in 1951.
New Jersey		John Lyle	A. C. Brown & Sons	New Jersey was a steam pilot boat built by A. C. Brown & Sons of Tottenville, Staten Island in 1902 for the New York and New Jersey Pilots' Association. After twelve years of service, the steamship SS Manchioneal rammed and sank her off Ambrose Lightship in 1914. The New Jersey was replaced by the pilot boat Sandy Hook.
Sandy Hook		William Healy	Crescent Shipyard	Sandy Hook was a steam pilot boat built in 1902, by Lewis Nixon at the Crescent Shipyard in Elizabeth, New Jersey. In 1914, she was purchased by the New York and New Jersey Pilots' Association to replace the pilot boat New Jersey, that was lost in 1914. She could carry 10 to 12 pilots that would help guide ships through the New York Harbor. The Norwegian America Line Oslofjord, with the Crown Prince Olav of Norway and Princess Märtha of Sweden on board, ran into and sank the Sandy Hook in 1939.
Mary Ellen	(no picture)			Mary Ellen was a New York pilot boat that went on her first trial cruise on May 31, 1845. She met with Baltimore pilot boat Eye, off Chincotrague. The Mary Ellen came 3 lengths ahead of the Eye.First Cruise, May 1845. On February 15, 1846, the pilot boat Mary Ellen was caught up in a storm off Sandy Hook and went ashore where all hands were saved.New York Daily Herald, New York, New York, 17 Feb 1846, Page 2.
John McKeon	(no picture)	John B. H Ward, Lawrence Jackson, John Rogers, Enon Russell	William H. Webb (formerly Web & Allen of Isaac Webb Shipyard)	The New Jersey pilot boat John McKeon was launched in November 1838 for a company of New Jersey pilots. She was valued at $9,000. Here builders were Web & Allen. She was lost on 28 August 1839 in the same storm as the pilot boat Gratitude with four crewmen.New York Daily Herald New York, New York, 28 Apr 1846, Page 1. The New York Daily Herald New York, New York, 1 Oct 1839, Page 6. See John McKeon, American lawyer and politician from New York. There is a Wooden Half Hull Model of the Pilot Boat John McKeon JOHN MCKEON (PILOT SCHOONER: 1838–1839).
Zenobia	(no picture)	n/a	n/a	The pilot boat Zenobia was a New York pilot boat. On May 20, 1845, the brig Amanda, Ames, from Guayama was spotted by pilot boat Zenobia 30 miles south of Sandy Hook, but refused to receive a pilot. The brig then went ashore on the West Bank and had to discharge part of her cargo to get off. On June 8, 1845, John W. Avery of John W. Avery & Co., 309 Water Street, put an ad in the New York Daily Herald to sale the fast sailing pilot boat Zenobia. She was 50-tons burthen. She lay at the floating dry dock, between Pike and Rutgers Street, New York, NY. On September 15, 1845, the Zenobia was sold at Port au Platt for $1,800 and sailed for St. Thomas.

== See also ==
- List of schooners
- List of boat types
- List of ship types
- List of sailing boat types
- List of types of naval vessels
- List of clipper ships
- List of sailboat designers and manufacturers
- List of shipbuilders and shipyards
