= James Avery (pilot boat) =

New York Pilot boat

History

United States
- Name: James Avery
- Namesake: James W. Avery
- Owner: New York Pilots
- Operator: Thomas Johnson, John Taylor
- Builder: Brown & Bell
- Launched: Sep 9, 1837
- Out of service: June 16, 1872

General characteristics
- Class & type: schooner
- Tonnage: 84-tons TM
- Propulsion: Sail

The James Avery was a 19th-century Sandy Hook pilot boat built in 1837 for a group of New York pilots. She was built by the shipbuilder Jacob Bell. The James Avery was a pilot boat during the American Civil War that helped in the search of the Confederate CSS Tallahassee. She was last seen in 1872, off the Highlands.

== Construction and service ==
On September 9, 1837, the pilot boat James Avery was launched from the Brown & Bell shipyard, on the East River, near the Dry Dock. She was built by shipbuilder Jacob Bell. The launch was witnessed by all the pilots of the port, with family and friends. Food was prepared in a sail loft in the shipyard for all to enjoy. Toasts and speeches were made for the success of the James Avery. She was owned by a company of New York pilots. She weighed 80-tons burthen. The boat number "9" was painted as a large number on the mainsail.

On 27 October 1837, Thomas Johnson of the pilot boat James Avery spoke to Captain Barr of the New Jersey Barque Louisa, if wanted to pilot. When he refused, the Louisa, proceeded to run ashore. Johnson went over to the boat and, at Barr's request, sent for assistance.

On 14 December 1840, John Henderson of the pilot boat James Avery, along with other pilots from the port of New York, stated that they had never been employed by J. D. Stevenson and no compensation has been offered or demanded.

On July 3, 1845, John W. Avery placed an ad in the New York Daily Herald saying that pilot boat James Avery picked up the brig Porto Rico of Belfast, Maine, that was abandoned near the Sandy Hook Light, now lying at India Wharf East River. Further information was available with John W. Avery & Co., 309 Water Street, New York City.

In 1860, she was one of only twenty-one New York and New Jersey pilot boats in the New York fleet.

On August 14, 1864, during the American Civil War, the pilot boat James Avery, No. 9 off Tavern House, was boarded by the United States Navy Juniata in search of the Confederate CSS Tallahassee.

David S. Nicolay served as boat-keeper on the James Avery, No. 9 from 1866 to 1867. He was transferred to the pilot boat Christianburg, No. 16 in 1867. The Christianburg was later renamed the Ariel Patterson.

During a blizzard in March 1868, the pilot boat James Avery, No. 9, along with other pilot boats, returned and anchored in the Lower New York Bay. John Taylor was aboard the James Avery off Montauk, New York, when the gale caused their boat to capsize. The crew was able to upright the boat and return home.

In 1870, the James Avery was listed along with twenty-two other Sandy Hook pilot boats.

On July 11, 1870, the Hudson Daily Star reported about a fishing excursion from Peck Slip to the Cholera Banks, where the steamer State of Maine spotted the pilot boat James Avery with Captain Joseph Henderson. The pilot on the State of Maine came aboard the Avery. Captain Henderson told the pilot that they were off course and came aboard the steamer to guide the Main to the Cholera Banks.

== End of service ==
The pilot boat James Avery, No. 9 was last reported on June 16, 1872, having spoken to the Schoolship Mercury twelve miles off the Highlands.

== See also ==
- List of Northeastern U. S. Pilot Boats
- Pilot boat
