= Mary Ann (pilot boat) =

New York Pilot boat

History

United States
- Name: Mary Ann
- Owner: New York Pilots, David A. Thomas
- Operator: John Taylor, Thomas Rowland, James M. West, Edward Maull (1830s); John Cannon (1860)
- Launched: 1830s
- Out of service: Late 1860s
- Homeport: New York

General characteristics
- Class & type: Schooner
- Displacement: 45 tons TM
- Propulsion: sails
- Sail plan: Schooner-rigged

The Mary Ann, No. 13 was a 19th-century Sandy Hook pilot boat built for the New York pilots. She helped transport maritime pilots between inbound or outbound ships coming into the New York Harbor. In 1860, the Mary Ann, was one of only twenty-one pilot boats in the New York and New Jersey fleet. She went ashore outside Sandy Hook in 1863.

== Construction and service ==
There are many reports of the pilot-boat Mary Ann from 1830 to 1863 in the New York newspapers. One of the first reports of the Mary Ann appears on 1837, when pilots James M. West and Edward Maull, of the pilot boat Mary Ann passed the pirate ship Susquehennah near Cape Henlopen Light, Delaware. Thomas Rowland, one of the pilots on board the Mary Ann said that they passed the Susquehennah and could see a cross in her fore topsail.

John Taylor did his apprentice on the 45-ton pilot boat Mary Ann in the early 1830s.

In 1830, Richard Westley, in the pilot boat Mary Ann, came across a shipwrecked schooner at Bareford Bar. In 1833, Westley, in the Mary Ann, used the Breakwater as a harbor in bad weather.

On April 23, 1852, pilot boat Mary Ann launched a yawl with two men to bring back a pilot that was on the bark Southerner in a heavy storm. The yawl came alongside the bark, when it filled with water and capsized, drowning the two men.

On April 6, 1856, the pilot boat Mary Ann, No. 13 was on station when she was run into by an unknown schooner. She was towed into port by the steamtug Hector.

On September 18, 1857, Captain James R. Murphy, from the pilot boat Mary Ann, No. 13 boarded the Spanish ship Emilia. The ship then went out at sea in heavy gales where she received further damage.

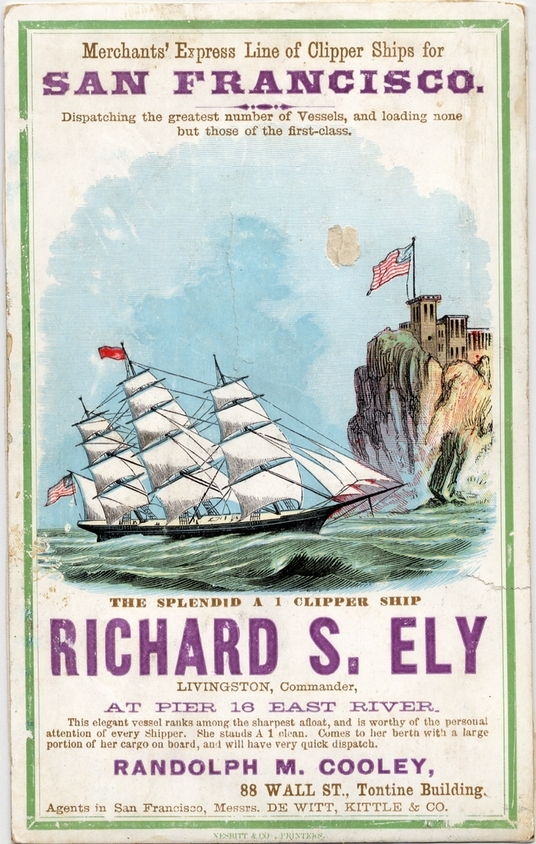
Clipper ship Richard S. Ely

On October 30, 1859, pilots Francis Pennea, Peter R. Ballie, and Thomas Atiken were on the pilot boat Mary Ann, No. 13 when they rescued three men in a yawl twenty-five miles off Sandy Hook. The men were blown out to sea during a storm, while they were returning to the Sandy Hook Lightship after picking up Charles C. Freeman from the Merchants' Express Line Clipper ship Richard S. Ely.

In 1860, the Mary Ann was one of only twenty-one pilot boats in the New York and New Jersey fleet. The boat number "13" was painted as a large number on her mainsail, that identified the boat as belonging to the Sandy Hook Pilots.

On October 10, 1860, New York Sandy Hook Pilot John Cannon, of the pilot boat Mary Ann, No. 13 signed a statement along with other pilots, that he was satisfied with the representation he had received from the New York Board of Commissioners of Pilots.

One of last reports of the pilot boat Mary Ann, No. 13 was on August 28, 1863, when she went ashore outside Sandy Hook. She was later able to get off the bar without any damage.

Sandy Hook pilot, Captain David Anderson Thomas purchased a controlling interest in the pilot boat Mary Ann, which he had up to his death in 1864.

== See also ==
- Pilot boat
- List of Northeastern U. S. Pilot Boats
