= William H. Starbuck (pilot boat) =

Sandy Hook Pilot boat

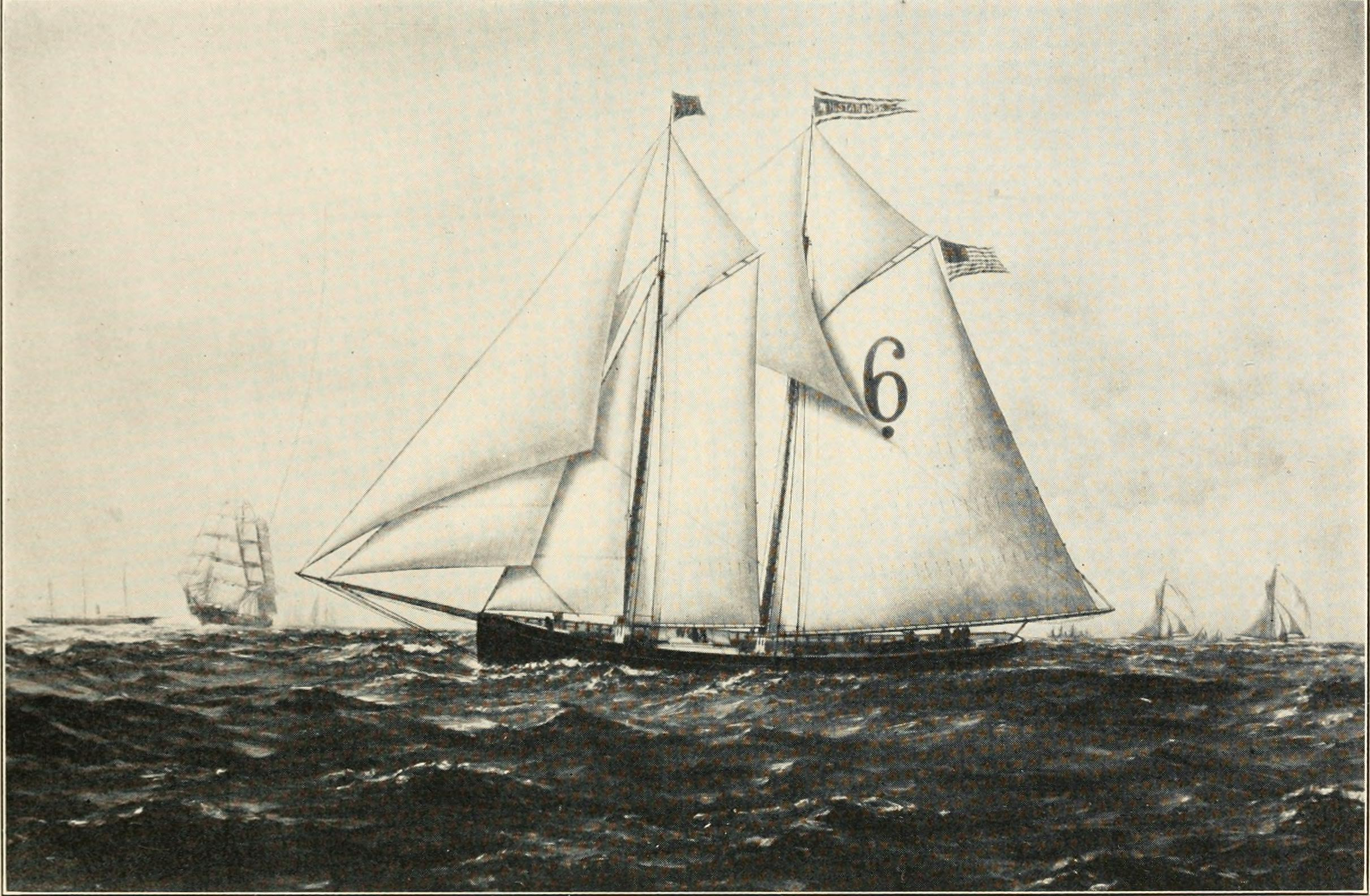
- Pilot Boat William Starbuck

History

United States
- Name: William H. Starbuck
- Namesake: William H. Starbuck, a railroad financier
- Owner: N. Y. Pilots, Jacob A Heath
- Operator: Archibald Heath, Henry Devere, James Devere, Frederick Ryerson, and Oscar Stoffreiden
- Builder: J. S. Ellis & Son shipyard, New York
- Launched: 30 May 1886
- Christened: By Emma Devere on 30 May 1886
- Out of service: 1 February 1896
- Fate: Sold

General characteristics
- Class & type: schooner
- Tonnage: 87 Thames Measurement
- Length: 75 ft 6 in (23.01 m)
- Beam: 20 ft 7 in (6.27 m)
- Draft: 10 ft 0 in (3.05 m)
- Depth: 9 ft 5 in (2.87 m)
- Propulsion: Sail
- Sail plan: 75 ft 6 in (23.01 m)
- Notes: Mahogany ash and cherry fittings; hackmatack timbers and white oak planking

William H. Starbuck was a 19th-century New York pilot boat built to take the place of the Mary and Catherine, that sank in 1885. She was launched from the J. S. Ellis & Son shipyard, at Tottenville, Staten Island in 1886. The Starbuck was one of the few pilot-boats to take the offensive in the Great Blizzard of 1888, when she ran into the steamship Japanese and survived one of the most severe recorded blizzards in American history. She was one of the last pilot boats that were sold in an age of steam and electricity.

== Construction and service ==
The William H. Starbuck was built to take the place of the Mary and Catharine, pilot-boat No. 6, which sank by the steamer Haverton, off Absecon Lighthouse on November 5, 1885. She was launched from the shipyard J. S. Ellis & Son, at Tottenville, Staten Island on May 30, 1886. Emma Devere broke a bottle of champagne over her bow to christen her. About a thousand people witnessed the launching, including William H. Starbuck, Captain Josiah Johnson of the Edmund Blunt, No. 2, James Hawkins of pilot-boat No. 4, as well as others. She was named after William H. Starbuck, a railroad financier, who paid for the cabin and presented the colours, including the signal flags. The Starbuck was modelled after Hempton Ellis and her lines were drawn by Howard I. Chapelle. The owner was pilot Jacob M. Heath, and her pilots were Archibald Heath, Henry Devere, James Devere, Frederick Ryerson, and Oscar Stoffreiden.

On March 10, 1888, the William H. Starbuck, No. 6, was run down by the British steamer SS Japanese, off Barnegat, New Jersey during the Blizzard of 1888. Six men were on board, including Captain Oscar Stoffreiden and Pilot Jacob M. Heath. Charles Edward Russell, describes this accident in great detail in his book From Sandy Hook to 62°. Russell said that "the stern of the steamer crashed down upon the bow of the pilot-boat and broke off her bowsprit, short." Some of the other men jumped to the Japanese, but Pilot Jacob M. Heath and three other men still aboard the Starbuck, pushed forward, made a sail on the foremast and sailed back to Sandy Hook.

A few months later, boatkeeper, Joseph Douglass fell overboard and drowned when the boat was off Absecon. Pilot Heath tried to save him but could not recover the body. The Starbuck came into port with her colours at half-mast.

== Out of service ==
On February 1, 1896, the New York Pilots discarded sixteen sailboats and moved them to the Erie Basin in Brooklyn. They were replaced with new up-to-date steam pilot boats. The William H. Starbuck, was sold for $5,000.

== See also ==
- List of Northeastern U. S. Pilot Boats
- Pilot boat
