= James M. Waterbury (pilot boat) =

New York Pilot boat

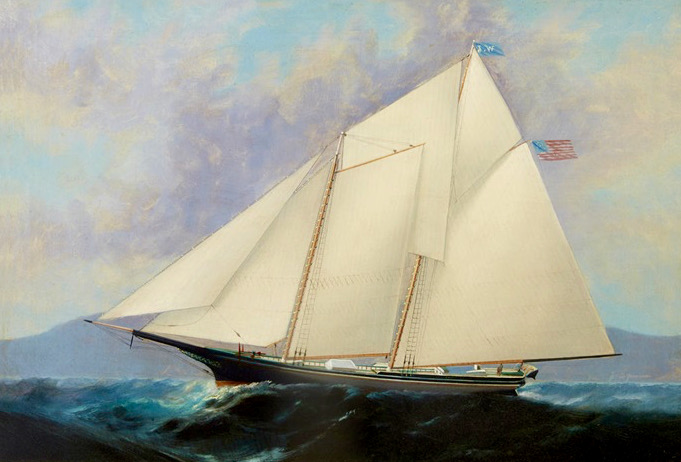
- Pilot schooner James M. Waterbury by Elisha Taylor Baker.

History

United States
- Name: James M. Waterbury
- Namesake: James M. Waterbury
- Owner: Orden & Roberts, New York pilots
- Operator: Thomas Morely (1871–1873)
- Completed: 1843
- Out of service: After 1867
- Home port: New York

General characteristics
- Class & type: Schooner
- Displacement: 43 tons TM
- Length: 76 ft 0 in (23.16 m)
- Draft: 9 ft 0 in (2.74 m)
- Propulsion: sails
- Sail plan: Schooner-rigged

The James M. Waterbury was a 19th-century Sandy Hook pilot boat built in 1843, at Williamsburgh, Brooklyn for a group of New York Pilots. She helped on many of the rescues along the New York Harbor. One of last reports of the James M. Waterbury was in 1867 when seaman James Roach fell overboard and was drowned off Fire Island.

== Construction and service ==
The schooner James M. Waterbury pilot boat was built in 1843, at Williamsburgh, Brooklyn for a group of New York Pilots. She was registered with the Record of American and Foreign Shipping from 1871 to 1873 to Captain Thomas Morely as Master; Orden & Roberts as owners, built in 1843; hailing from the port of New York. Her dimensions were 76 ft. length on deck; 9 ft. draft; 8 ft. and 76-tons burthen.

One of the first reports of the James M. Waterbury appears on September 20, 1843, when the pilot boat James M. Waterbury was informed that the ship Vespasian had gone ashore in the fog, ten miles North of Barnegat Lightship. The ship had bilged with six feet of water in her cargo hold.

On May 11, 1852, the pilot boat James M. Waterbury came across the British ship Kate, seventy miles off Sandy Hook, that was in a bad storm and started to leak. The captain and most of the crew had already abandoned her. Pilot M. Macarthy, from the pilot boat, was put on board the Kate and then went to get assistance in her rescue. The Achilles towed her safely into port.

In 1860, the James M. Waterbury was one of only twenty-one pilot boats in the New York and New fleet. The boat number "10" was painted as a large number on her mainsail, that identified the boat as belonging to the Sandy Hook Pilots. On October 10, 1860, New York Sandy Hook Pilot Ralph Noble, of the pilot boat James M. Waterbury, No. 10 signed a statement along with other pilots, that they were satisfied with the representation they have received from the New York Board of Commissioners of Pilots.

On February 7, 1863, James W. Avery put an ad in the New York Daily Herald saying that a 16-foot yawl was lost or stolen from the pilot boat James M. Waterbury. The yawl was painted brown on the outside and yellow on the inside, with the name of "David Blackburn" branded on her. A reward for $10 was offered for her recovery. Apply to John W. Avery, 309 Water Street.

On April 11, 1864, the safety of the pilot boat James M. Waterbury was reported in question when she was last seen with only one pilot on board, the rest having arrived in port in yawls.

One of last reports of the pilot boat James M. Waterbury was on April 10, 1867, when seaman James Roach of Cork, Ireland, fell overboard and was drowned off Fire Island on board the New York pilot boat James M. Waterbury.

== See also ==
- Pilot boat
- List of Northeastern U. S. Pilot Boats
