= James Gordon Bennett (pilot boat) =

New Jersey Pilot boat

History

United States
- Name: James Gordon Bennett
- Namesake: James Gordon Bennett Jr., publisher of the New York Herald
- Owner: N. J. Pilots (1876–1893); Jas. F. Brown (1894–1898)
- Operator: Captain Daniel C. Chapman (1876–1893); Jas. F. Brown (1894–1898)
- Builder: Lawrence & Foulks; C. & R. Poillon
- Launched: 11 May 1870
- Christened: 11 May 1870
- Out of service: 26 November 1897
- Renamed: Hermit (1897)
- Fate: Sank

General characteristics
- Type: Schooner
- Tonnage: 52 tons TM
- Length: 75 ft 0 in (22.86 m)
- Beam: 21 ft 0 in (6.40 m)
- Depth: 7 ft 5 in (2.26 m)
- Propulsion: Sail
- Sail plan: 70 ft 0 in (21.34 m) foremast; 71 ft 6 in (21.79 m) mainmast; 48 ft 9 in (14.86 m) boom

The James Gordon Bennett was a 19th-century two-masted pilot boat, built in 1870 at the Lawrence & Foulks shipyard. She was named in honor of James Gordon Bennett, Jr., publisher of the New York Herald. She went ashore in 1893 and was rebuilt at the C. & R. Poillon shipyard. In 1897, the James Gordon Bennett was bought by Miller J. Morse of the Atlantic Yacht Club and made into a yacht. He changed her name to Hermit. The New Jersey pilots purchased her in 1901, to replace the David T. Leahy, that was run down by the steamship Alene. The Hermit sank in 1906, when the steamship Monterey ran into her.

== Construction and service ==
=== James Gordon Bennett (1870–1893) ===
On May 11, 1870, the James Gordon Bennett, No. 6, was launched from the Lawrence & Foulks shipyard of North Fifth Street, Williamsburg, Brooklyn. About one thousand people witnessed the launch. The James Gordon Bennett replaced the pilot boat A. T. Stewart, that was lost in 1869. At the launch and naming ceremony, Katie Chapman, daughter of Captain Daniel C. Chapman, gave the boat the name James Gordon Bennett in honor of James Gordon Bennett, Jr., publisher of the New York Herald. Captain Chapman supervised the construction of the new boat. The company of pilots included: Daniel C. Chapman (captain), John H. Chapman, Henry Beebe, William Gotham, Edward Darie, Theo Lore Dexter, Alexander Dexter, and Nelson Comstock.

By 1874, the James Gordon Bennett was listed as a New Jersey pilot boat with Daniel C. Chapman as the captain.

The James Gordon Bennett was registered as a pilot schooner with the Record of American and Foreign Shipping, from 1876 to 1893. Her ship master was Daniel C. Chapman; her owners were the New Jersey Pilots; built in 1870 at New York; and her hailing port was the Port of New Jersey. Her dimensions were 75 feet (23 m) in length; 21 feet (6.4 m) breadth of beam; 7.5 feet (2.3 m) depth of hold; and 54 tons tonnage.

On January 26, 1884, Captain Henry Beebe, at age 61, one of the pilots of the James Gordon Bennett died at his home in Brooklyn, New York.

On February 17, 1885, a Brooklyn pilot, Charles Warner of the James Gordon Bennett, No. 6, was swept overboard and drowned during a storm off the Sandy Hook Lightship. Warner was only 28 years old and had a wife and two children.

On November 8, 1885, the James Gordon Bennett picked up the passengers of the pilot boat Mary and Catherine that was struck the British tramp trade steamship Haverton. The pilot boat sank in a few minutes and the steamship did not stop to help.

On January 13, 1893, the pilot boat James Gordon Bennett, No. 6, surrounded by ice near Sea Bright, New Jersey, went ashore and broke up with both of her masts gone and part of her deck was missing. Pilots James Crooker and Barrett were on board and a crew of six men were able to reach land safely.

=== James Gordon Bennett (1893–1897) ===
On August 7, 1893, a new pilot boat James Gordon Bennett was launched at the C. & R. Poillon shipyard at the foot of Clinton Street, Brooklyn, New York. She became part of the New York pilot fleet.

The James Gordon Bennett was registered as a pilot schooner with the Record of American and Foreign Shipping, from 1894 to 1898. Her ship master was Jas. F. Brown; her owner was Jas. F. Brown; built in 1893 at Brooklyn, New York; and her hailing port was the Port of New York. Her dimensions were 75 ft. in length; 21 ft. breadth of beam; 7.5 ft. depth of hold; and 67 tons tonnage.

On April 2, 1895, pilot W. Crocker of the James Gordon Bennett, was in command when he spotted the what was left of the steamer City of Haverhill, off Barnegat, New Jersey, and the body of her captain, W. P. Watrous. The rest of the crew had already escaped.

=== End of service ===
On November 26, 1897, the Sandy Hook pilot boat James Gordon Bennett was bought by Miller J. Morse of the Atlantic Yacht Club, who made her into a yacht so he could take her on a cruise to the West Indies. He changed her name to Hermit. On May 24, 1900, Morse sold the Hermit to the a Mr. F. A. Higgins.

On October 18, 1901, the New Jersey pilots purchased the Hermit to replace the David T. Leahy that was run down by the steamship Alene.

On December 16, 1906, in bad weather, the Ward Line steamship Monterey ran into the New Jersey pilot boat Hermit, No. 7, near the Sandy Hook Light. She was split into two and sank. The crew was brought aboard the Monterey and returned to the city.

== See also ==
- List of Northeastern U. S. Pilot Boats
