= Actaea =

Actaea may refer to:

== Mythology ==
- Actaea (mythology), one of two characters from Greek mythology

== Biology ==
- Actaea (plant), a genus of flowering plants
- Actaea (crab), a genus of crabs

== Astronomy ==
- Actaea (moon), the moon of the trans-Neptunian object 120347 Salacia

== Other ==
- Actaea (pilot boat), a New York pilot boat
- Actaea, pseudonym of Elizabeth Cabot Agassiz (1822–1907), naturalist
