= Caprice (pilot boat) =

Sandy Hook pilot boat built in 1871

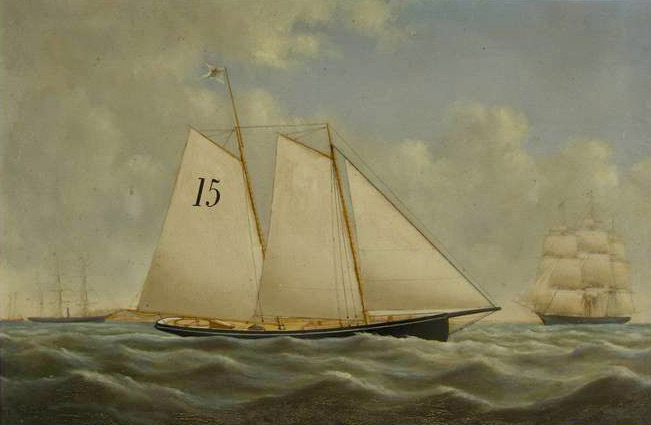
- Pilot boat Caprice, No. 15.

History

United States
- Name: Caprice
- Owner: Eugene Sullivan and Peter McEnry
- Operator: George. H. Sisco
- Builder: Brown & Lovell, Boston, Massachusetts
- Launched: April 10, 1871
- Decommissioned: 1891
- Homeport: New York
- Fate: Sold

General characteristics
- Class & type: Schooner
- Tonnage: 70-tons TM
- Length: 80 ft 0 in (24.38 m)
- Beam: 20 ft 3 in (6.17 m)
- Depth: 9 ft 0 in (2.74 m)
- Propulsion: sails
- Sail plan: Schooner-rigged

The Caprice was a 19th-century Sandy Hook pilot boat built in 1871 by Brown & Lovell in East Boston, Massachusetts for Peter McEnany and other New York pilots. In 1876, she was run down and sank, off Bay Ridge, Brooklyn, by the steamship New Orleans. She was raised and was one of the pilot boats that survived the Great Blizzard of 1888. The Caprice was last reported sailing off the coast of New York in 1891.

== Construction and service ==
The pilot boat Caprice was built in 1871 by Brown & Lovell shipyard at East Boston, Massachusetts, originally as a Boston schooner yacht. She was later made into a New York pilot boat in 1877 for Pilot McEnany and other New York Sandy Hook pilots.

The Caprice was launched on April 10, 1871, as a clipper yacht from the shipyard of Brown & Lovell, at East Boston. She was registered with the Record of American and Foreign Shipping from 1874 to 1885. From 1874 to 1875, the ship master was George H. Sisco; her owners were Eugene Sullivan and Peter McEnry; and she belonged to the Port of New York. From 1876 to 1885 the ship master changed to pilot E. H. Sullivan and her owner changed to the New York Pilots.

On February 28, 1876, the pilot boat Caprice, No. 15 was run down and sank, off Bay Ridge, Brooklyn, by the Cromwell line steamship New Orleans. The crew were able to escape onto the New Orleans, and there were no deaths. Captain Derborn, the captain of the New Orleans provided his account of the collision. The Caprice was later raised and towed to the city to be refurbished and put back to service.

On February 3, 1878, the pilot boat Caprice, No. 15 was in heavy icy storm off Barnegat Light and was completely wrecked. Seaman Charles Walburg of the Caprice was washed overboard and drowned. Six of the other crew were taken safely off the pilot boat by a passing bark and returned to the city.

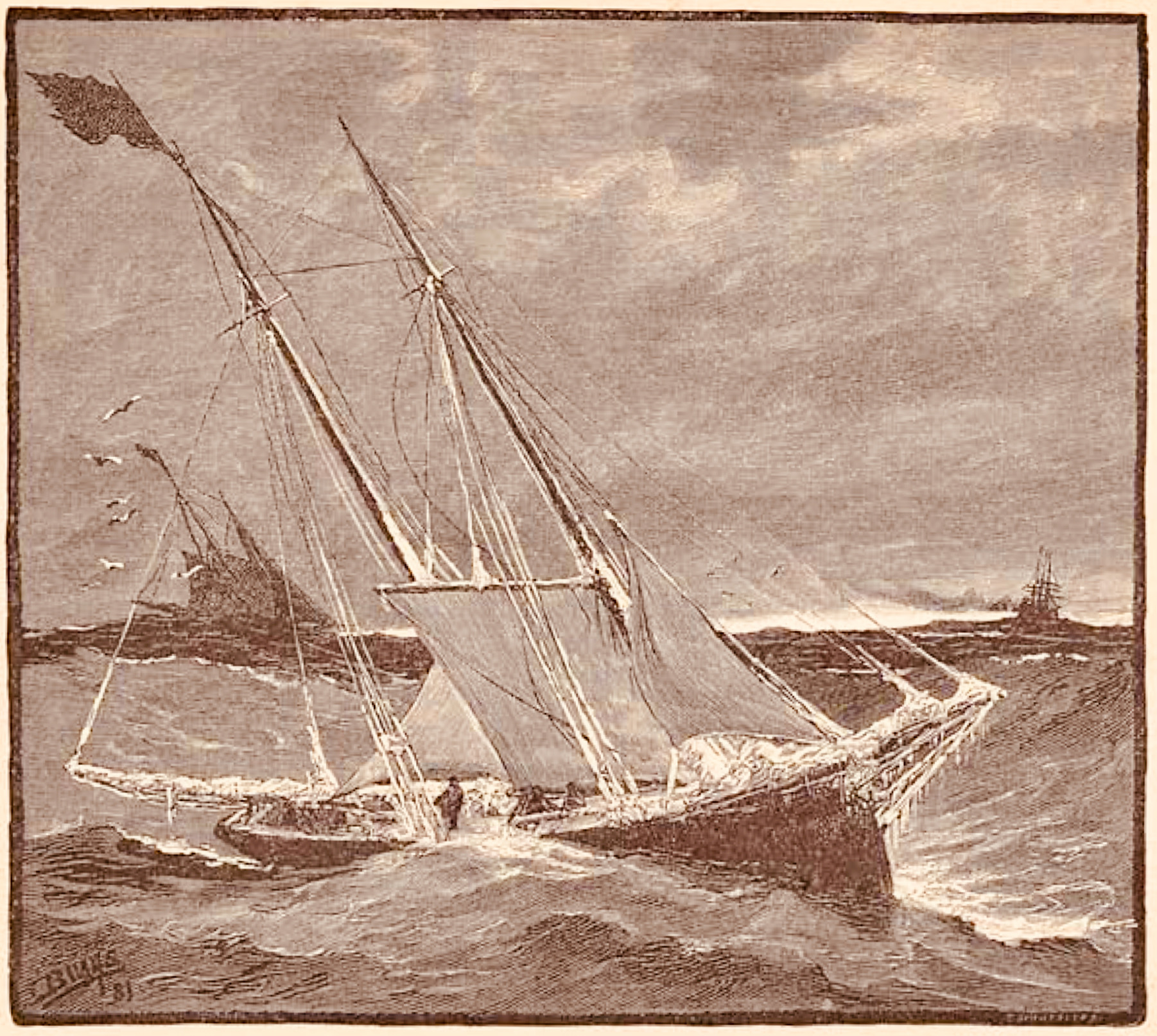
Pilot boat Caprice iced up in a winter storm.

In 1881, two gentlemen, Mr. Burns and Mr. Benjamin, were invited to take a voyage, for a week, on the working pilot schooner Caprice. The story A Cruise In A Pilot-Boat was published in The Century Magazine in the November 1881 – April 1882 edition. From the article and references to ship's logs, we learn that the Caprice went past Castle Garden, out to Barnegat light, by the Little Egg Harbor, and up the coast to Sandy Hook. They continued to Nantucket Lightship where they described having spotted a steamer and a race to board it. They took out a yawl with two seamen and a pilot, and reached the leeward side of the steamer. The pilot then climbed up the ladder to board the ship. The story ends with the pilot boat going through The Narrows back into port.

In the Blizzard of 1888 Pilot Sullivan was in the Caprice when the blizzard struck. The boat was fifteen miles south of the Sandy Hook Lightship and was driven seventy-five miles south. The Caprice weathered out the blizzard and was only slightly damaged as her steering gear was disabled.

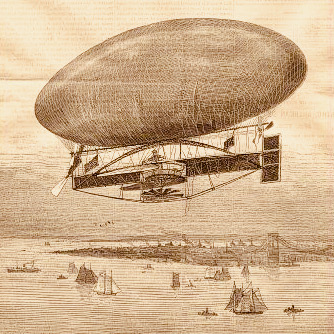
Pilot boat Caprice and Peter C. Campbell's airship.

On July 16, 1889, the pilot boat Caprice and pilot John Phalan, reported seeing Peter C. Campbell's airship at Williamsburg, Brooklyn. He was seventy-four miles south of Montauk Point, when Phalan saw a big yellow, oval-shaped balloon dragging in the ocean. The balloon then separated from the airship and flew up into the air. Professor Edward D. Hogan was believed to be lost at sea.

On February 8, 1890, during a dense fog, the pilot boat Caprice, No. 15, on station duty, when she struck the shoal at the end of the West Bank Light in the Lower New York Bay and then sank. The pilot and crew escaped in life boats and went to Staten Island. A wrecking company was able to raise the boat and tow it to back to Brooklyn.

The last report of the pilot boat Caprice was on June 9, 1891, when she was struck by a large whale off the coast of New York. Pilots Cameron and J. J. Kelly of the Caprice were awaken when they heard a thump and discovered that a whale had struck their boat. The whale followed them for a while as they sailed away but soon tired as he was badly hurt.

== See also ==
- Pilot boat
- List of Northeastern U. S. Pilot Boats
