= Mary and Catherine =

Sandy Hook Pilot boat

History

United States
- Name: Mary and Catherine
- Namesake: Wives of Josiah Johnson
- Owner: New York Pilots, Josiah Johnson Sr.
- Operator: John Taylor, Devere, Oscar Stoffenden
- Builder: Jacob Aaron Westervelt shipyard
- Launched: September 26, 1848
- Out of service: November 6, 1885
- Fate: Sold

General characteristics
- Class & type: schooner
- Tonnage: 41 Thames Measurement
- Length: 65 ft 5 in (19.94 m)
- Beam: 19 ft 0 in (5.79 m)
- Depth: 7 ft 0 in (2.13 m)
- Propulsion: Sail

The Mary and Catherine was a 19th-century New York pilot boat built in 1848 by the Jacob Aaron Westervelt shipyard. She was hit and sunk by the steamship Haverton in 1885. The collision was the subject of a court case that went to the Supreme Court of the United States as Devere v. The Haverton. The Mary and Catherine was replaced by the pilot boat William H. Starbuck.

== Construction and service ==
Pilot boat Mary and Catherine was built by Captain Josiah Johnson Sr. and launched on September 26, 1848, from the Westervelt and M'Kay shipyard. Mary was the name of Johnson's first wife and Catherine was the name of his second wife.

On March 5, 1851, the Mary and Catherine came across a large amount of bales of cotton and barrels off Nantucket. Captain Josiah Johnson was in search of the vessel that had the accident.

The Mary and Catherine, No. 6, was one of only twenty-one New York and New Jersey pilot boats in 1860.

On March 10, 1869, the Mary & Catherine took the place of the Josiah Johnson, which was lost in the collision with the schooner Wanata. The crew of the Johnson were transferred to the Mary & Catherine.

The Mary and Catherine was registered as a pilot Schooner with the Record of American and Foreign Shipping, from 1876 to 1882. Her ship master was John Taylor; her owners were the New York Pilots; built in 1848 at New York City; and her hailing port was the Port of New York. Her dimensions were 65.5 ft. in length; 19 ft. breadth of beam; 7 ft. depth of hold; and 41-tons Tonnage.

== Out of service ==
On November 6, 1885, the thirty-two year old Mary and Catherine, No. 6, was cruising off Absecon, New Jersey when she was struck the British tramp trade steamship Haverton. The pilot boat sank in a few minutes and the steamship did not stop to help. The pilots and crew escaped in yawls and were picked up by the pilot boat James Gordon Bennett, No. 9. A cabin boy was below deck and went down with the pilot boat. Her owners said they would build another pilot-boat. She was valued at $7,000. She was replaced by the pilot boat William H. Starbuck, No. 6.

On November 18, 1885, the Pilot Commissioners met with the survivors of the pilot boat. Pilot Oscar Stoffenden was in charge of the boat when it went down. The other pilots were: John Healey, Jacob M. Heath, Archie Heath, Henry Devere, John J. Devere, Frederick Reinsen and Van Pelt.

The case about the collision of the Mary and Catherine, went to the U.S. Supreme Court as Devere v. The Haverton. On November 17, 1890, the suit to recover the value of the pilot boat Mary and Catherine was decided by the circuit court for $6,057; on appear, the circuit court awarded $3,029. The appeal was dismissed by the Supreme Court and the lower court decision prevailed.

== See also ==
- List of Northeastern U. S. Pilot Boats
- Pilot boat
