= Edward E. Barrett =

Sandy Hook Pilot boat

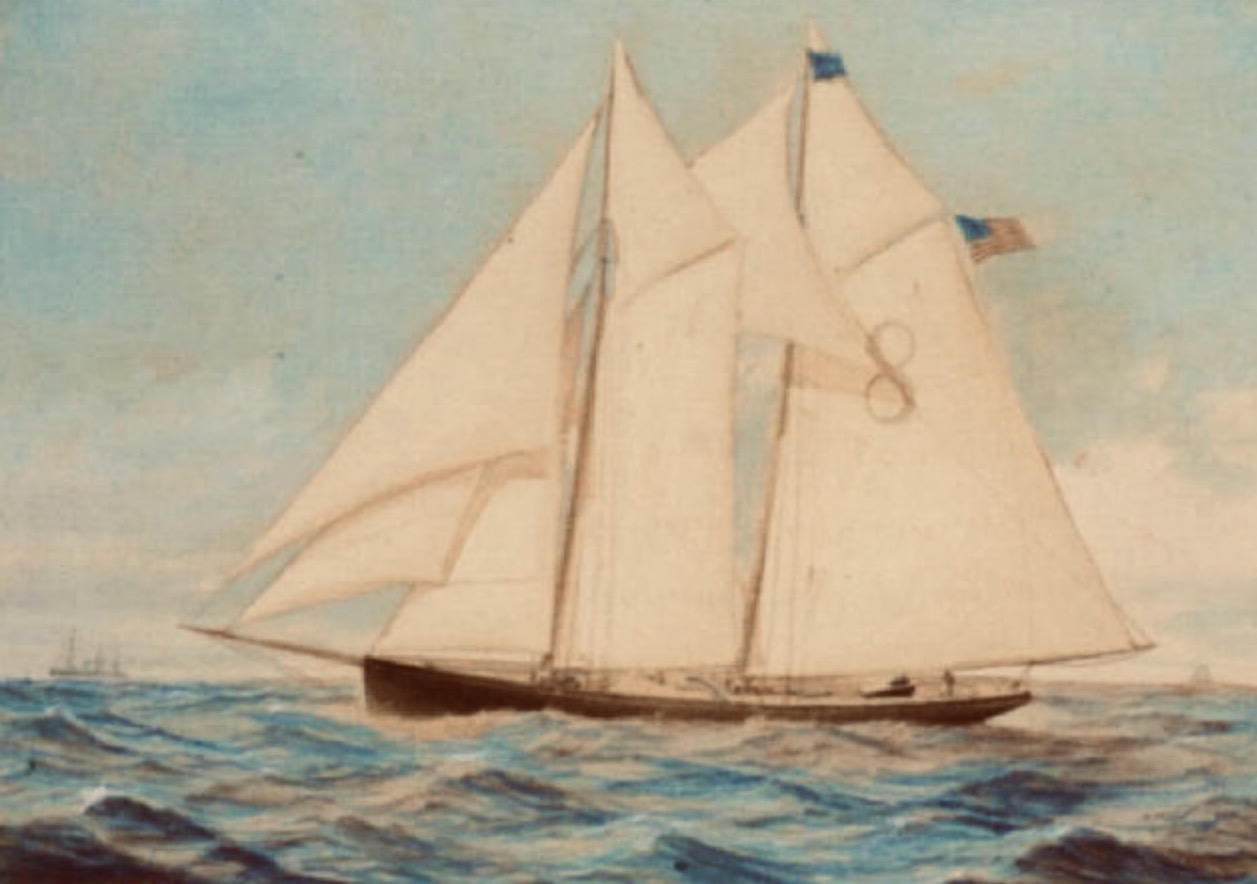
- Pilot boat Edward E. Barrett, No. 8, approaches the New York Harbor

History

United States
- Name: Edward E. Barrett
- Namesake: Edward E. Barrett
- Owner: N. J. Pilots
- Operator: Captain William W. Black
- Builder: C. & R. Poillon
- Cost: $18,000
- Launched: November 1, 1883
- Out of service: July 15, 1904
- Fate: Sold

General characteristics
- Class & type: schooner
- Tonnage: 66-tons TM
- Length: 83 ft 2 in (25.35 m)
- Beam: 21 ft 2 in (6.45 m)
- Depth: 8 ft 5 in (2.57 m)
- Propulsion: Sail
- Notes: Cabin contains six berths.

The Edward E. Barrett, or Edward E. Bartlett, was a 19th-century two-masted Sandy Hook pilot boat, built by C. & R. Poillon in 1883 and designed by William Townsend. She helped transport New Jersey maritime pilots between inbound or outbound ships coming into the New York Harbor. She was one of the pilot boats that survived the Great Blizzard of 1888. In the age of steam, the Barrett ended her pilot commission and was sold in 1904.

== Construction and service ==
New Jersey pilot-boat Edward E. Barrett, No. 8 was launched on November 1, 1883, from the C. & R. Poillon shipyard at the foot of Bridge Street in Brooklyn, New York. She was designed by William Townsend, who designed the pilot-boats Columbia and James Gordon Bennett. She was christened the Edward D. Barrett by Amelia Eva Barrett, the daughter of Edward E. Barrett, whom the boat was named. She could accommodate a crew of eight men. The new pilot boat was No. 8 of the New Jersey fleet.

The Edward E. Barrett was registered with the Record of American and Foreign Shipping from 1884 to 1900 to Captain William W. Black as master and the N. J. Pilots as owners; built in 1883 at Brooklyn, New York. Her dimensions were 83.2 ft. length on deck; 21.2 ft. breadth of beam; 8.5 ft. depth of hold; and 66-tons burthen.

During the Great Blizzard of 1888 the Edward E. Barrett, No. 8 went to sea on March 16, 1888. She was feared to be lost with other New York and New Jersey pilot boats.

On December 30, 1892, the pilot boat Edward E. Barrett came into port after struggling with bad weather. She went out for a cruise past Sandy Hook looking for incoming vessels. Pilots Martin Connor, Charles Hughes, and Thomas J. Rese, Nicholas A. Wall, and six crewmen were on board. She drifted for seven days in bad weather that turned into a hurricane about 500 miles until she saw the steamer Pomeranian. Pilot Connor took a yawl to the steamer and came aboard. The steamer Rhynland joined them and added another pilot from the Barrett.

On October 31, 1893, the Edward E. Barrett, No. 8, was listed as one of eight New Jersey Sandy Hook pilot boats, at 56.59-tons.

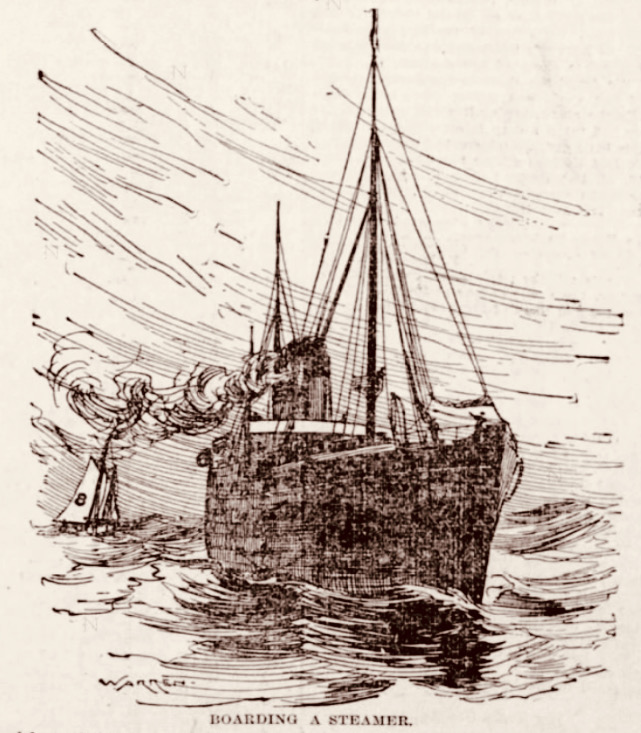
Pilot boat Edward E. Barrett boarding a steamer in 1895.

On February 24, 1895, the Democrat and Chronicle ran a feature article about the life and peril by pilots who guide ocean liners into port. The article spoke about the Edward E. Barrett as a schooner pilot boat, that cost $18,000 and was "one of the best of the thirty boats in the pilot fleet that patrol the entrance to the port of New York." The Edward E. Barrett has sailed as far as the Sable Island, which is 630 miles from New York.

On June 22, 1897, the pilot boat Edward E. Barrett saluted the new steam pilot-boat New York on her trial trip down the Narrows. The code signals "C, Q, F, P," meaning Allow Me To Congratulate You, were flying from the Sandy Hook Lightship as they passed by.

On January 2, 1901, the pilot boat Edward E. Barrett was struck by the Morgan Line steamer El Monte outside Sandy Hook. She was then towed to Stapleton, Staten Island, by the pilot boat New York.

== End of service ==
On July 15, 1904, the pilot boat Edward E. Barrett completed her pilot commission and was put up for sale for $3,000.

== See also ==
- List of Northeastern U. S. Pilot Boats
- Pilot boat history
