= Actaea (pilot boat) =

New York Pilot boat

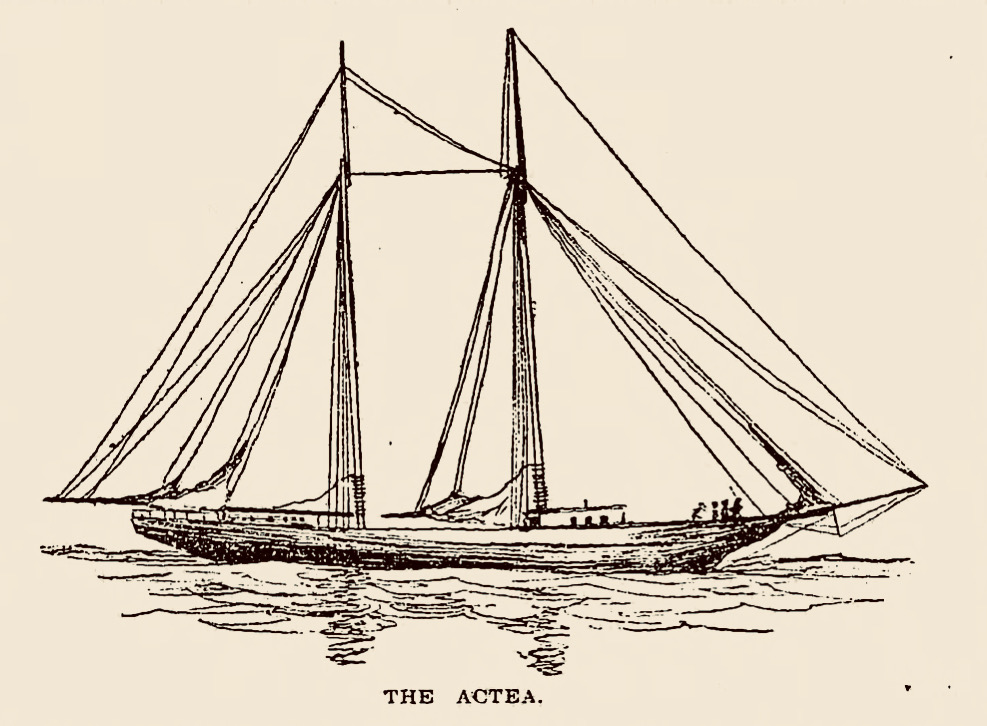
- Schooner yacht Actaea (or Actea)

History

United States
- Name: Actaea
- Namesake: Actaea
- Owner: David Sears (1880); New York Sandy Hook Pilots (1890); John J. Phelps (1896); M. L. Williams (1900); Henry Seguine
- Operator: David Sears (1880); James J. Keeley (1890)
- Builder: Shipyard in Kennebunk, Maine
- Cost: $15,000
- Launched: 1880
- Out of service: 1 February 1896
- Fate: Sold

General characteristics
- Class & type: Schooner
- Tonnage: 97-tons TM
- Length: 94 ft 9 in (28.88 m)
- Beam: 22 ft 1 in (6.73 m)
- Depth: 9 ft 1 in (2.77 m)
- Propulsion: Sail

The Actaea, or Actea, was a 19th-century Boston yacht built in 1880 by Weld and David Clark of Kennebunk, Maine for David Sears Jr., of Montgomery Sears of Boston. She was purchased by a group of New York Sandy Hook Pilots in 1890. She was one of the largest and fastest pilot boats in the fleet. In the age of steam, the Actaea was sold in 1896 to John J. Phelps of the New York Yacht Club and used as a pleasure yacht.

== Construction and service ==
The two-masted schooner Actaea was built in 1880 by Mr. Weld and David Clark, as a Boston yacht at Kennebunk, Maine, for David Sears Jr., of Montgomery Sears of Boston. Actaea comes from the Greek myth Actaea, which means seashore.

The American yacht Actea of Boston was at Halifax, Nova Scotia. She was repaired and sailed back to Boston on July 24, 1880.

The Actaea was registered with Record of American and Foreign Shipping from 1881 through 1900 as a Schooner Yacht, with the David Sears as the owner; built in 1880 at Kennebunk, Maine; Port of call was the Port of Boston; she was thoroughly overhauled in 1891. Her dimensions were 94.9 ft. in length; 22.1 ft. breadth of beam; 9.1 ft. depth of hold; and 97-tons burthen.

On May 15, 1882, David Sears sailed his schooner-yacht Actaea from Boston to Cowes, Isle of Wight, that took 24 days. They had a crew of 12 men, including the owner, Charles Longfellow and James Barker. On September 1, 1882, they sailed for Brest, France, then to Portugal, Cádiz, Gibraltar, Morocco, Madeira, Cádiz, Cape Verde islands and then to Havana. They arrived in New York on December 24, 1882, and then back to Boston.

The Actaea was purchased by the Sandy Hook Pilots in 1890 for $15,000 to replace a pilot boat that was lost off the Highlands. She was one of the largest and fastest boats in the pilot fleet. She had flaring shaped bows. The boat number "15" was painted as a large number on her mainsail, that identified the boat as belonging to the Sandy Hook Pilots.

On June 13, 1891, pilot James J. Keeley came into port with and the steamer Caledonia. He reported that when he was on the Actaea, he ran into a school of whales, 350 miles east of Sandy Hook. They were moving at a rate of 20 knots an hour. One of the whales did not dive soon enough and the sharp bows of the boat struck him on the back, which caused a large gash in the fish and a loud thump on the boat, causing everyone on the boat to wake up.

On May 7, 1894, pilot James J. Keely, on the station boat Actaea, went aboard the French steamship La Champagne to help bring the vessel into the New York Bay. Because of dense fog, he had difficulties bringing the vessel through the channel and around the buoys. The steamship landed on the sand bar off Fort Hamilton. 14 lifeboats were placed in the water to lighted the load, but this did not help. As a result, 329 passengers had to be transferred to the boat Rosa.

== End of service ==
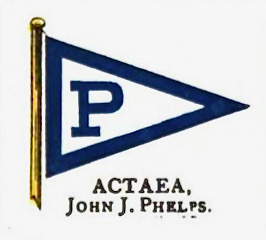
John J. Phelps pennant flag, ca. 1899

On February 1, 1896, the New York Sandy Hook Pilots discarded sixteen sailboats and moved them to the Erie Basin in Brooklyn. They were replaced with steam pilot boats. Actaea was purchased by John J. Phelps of the New York Yacht Club for $4,500. She was then towed from Erie Basin to the C. & R. Poillon shipyard on May 13, 1896, to be overalled.

The Actaea was registered to John J. Phelps, with the Atlantic Yacht Club of the New York Harbor. Phelps had a private pennant flag with the letter "P" on it.

John J. Phelps of Newark, sold the Actaea to Captain Charles A. McCarthy of Brooklyn, his brother Frank and a cousin, W. R. McCarthy. On January 26, 1898, the Actaea left the South Ferry, Brooklyn and traveled around the Cape Horn to the Strait of Magellan, San Francisco, then to St. Michael, Alaska on a Klondike voyage. The voyage took 120 days to complete.

On April 19, 1900, John J. Phelps sold his steam yacht Actaea to M. L. Williams of Montreal, to be used on Lake Memphremagog, Vermont. The boat had to reach the lake by train from Nyack, New York because there was no direct water access to the lake.

== See also ==
- List of Northeastern U.S. pilot boats
