= David T. Leahy =

New York Pilot boat

History

United States
- Name: David T. Leahy
- Namesake: David T. Leahy, American woolen merchant
- Operator: Dennis Reardon
- Builder: C. & R. Poillon
- Cost: $20,000
- Launched: 3 September 1890
- Christened: 3 September 1890
- Out of service: 18 August 1901
- Renamed: James Gordon Bennett
- Fate: Sank

General characteristics
- Class & type: schooner
- Tonnage: 77-tons TM
- Length: 96 ft 0 in (29.26 m)
- Beam: 30 ft 10 in (9.40 m)
- Depth: 9 ft 4 in (2.84 m)
- Propulsion: Sail

The David T. Leahy was a 19th-century two-masted pilot boat schooner, built in 1890 at the C. & R. Poillon shipyard in New York City. She was named in honor of David T. Leahy, a wealthy woolen merchant. She was said to be the fastest boat in the New York and New Jersey fleet. In 1899, the David T. Leahy was renamed the James Gordon Bennett when the pilots consolidated their business. She sank off Sandy Hook when the German Atlas Line steamship Alene hit her in 1901.

== Construction and service ==
New York pilot-boat David T. Leahy was launched on 3 September 1890 from the C. & R. Poillon shipyard at the foot of Clinton Street, Brooklyn, New York. The launch was witnessed by over thousand people, including Captain Walter Brewer. Lulu Cooper, daughter of Pilot John Cooper, broke the champagne bottle across the bow to christened the new pilot-boat the David T. Leahy. She was said to be the fastest of the twenty-eight pilot-boats in the New York and New Jersey fleet. She was owned by Dennis Reardon, Jeremiah Reardon, John L. Godbey, James D. M. Beebe and Stephen H. Cooper. She took the place of the yacht Macomes. Mr. David T. Leahy, for whom the boat was named, provided the food and entertainment.

On October 1, 1890, the David T. Leahy went on her trail trip. She was pulled out from her moorings at the foot of Peck slip, New York, by a tugboat Adelaide. One hundred and fifty guests were on board as she was towed out to the bay. Speeches were made by the Assistant District Attorney John Clark, Brooklyn Major Joseph Powell, David T. Leahy, New Jersey Pilot Commissioners Captain Robert Simonson, and others. She was known as the Number 5 and took the place of the one lost in the blizzard of 1888. Captain Dennis Reardon was the ship Master. The tugboat dropped the line and the boat sailed out into the bay, but because of the lack of wind, she was towed back. Mr. David T. Leahy was a wealthy retired woolen merchant in New York. The David T. Leahy cost $20,000.

On June 12, 1893, the New York pilot-boat David T. Leahy, No. 5 collided in a thick fog with the Royal Phelps Carroll's Yacht Navahoe 250 miles off Sandy Hook, New Jersey. Pilots Dennis Reardon and Charles Warnor were on the Leahy during the collision. The pilot-boat was damaged and lost her bowsprit and wrenched her stern.

On 6 Nov 1897, Captain Gus Tennessen, one of the oldest members of the New Jersey Pilots' Association, died of a heart attack on board the pilot-boat David T. Leahy off Sandy Hook. There were seven pilots on board the boat.

In 1899, the David T. Leahy was rechristened with the name of an older pilot boat the James Gordon Bennett, which was disposed of when the pilots consolidated their business in 1896.

== End of service ==
On August 18, 1901, the pilot-boat James Gordon Bennett, formerly known as the David T. Leahy, sank off Sandy Hook when the German Atlas Line steamship Alene hit the James Gordon Bennett on a clear day. Four of the crew on the James Gordon Bennett drowned. Pilot Fred Hopkins and Alexander Dexter were rescued by the steam pilot-boat New York. Five other crewmen were saved.

== See also ==
- List of Northeastern U. S. Pilot Boats
