= John W. Avery =

Union Army colonel and 19th-century grocery store owner

Colonel John W. Avery

Personal details
- Born: John W. Avery; May 2, 1814 New York City, US
- Died: March 24, 1891 (aged 76) New York City, US
- Spouse: Sarah Banning (m. 1831; died 1886)
- Children: 4
- Occupation: Wholesale Grocer
- Profession: Soldier, Businessman

Military service
- Allegiance: United States (Union)
- Branch/service: United States Army
- Years of service: 1862–1866
- Rank: colonel in the Cavalry
- Commands: 3rd and 8th Regiments
- Battles/wars: American Civil War

Colonel John W. Avery, (April 2, 1814 – March 24, 1891) was a merchant from Brooklyn, New York who was in business there for over fifty years. He volunteered during the American Civil War to join the Union Army. He became a Union officer, reaching the rank of lieutenant colonel, who commanded the 8th Regiment National Guard Infantry (formerly the 8th Regiment, New York State Militia), known as the Washington Greys He was in the New York Army National Guard and as one of the first Wholesale grocery store in New York City. The store served as the regular headquarters for the New York Sandy Hook Pilots.

== Early life ==
Avery was born on Water Street, New York City in 1814. He married Sarah Avery who was 72 at the time of her death. Avery lived at 127 Hooper Street in Brooklyn, New York for over forty years. He had eight sons. His grandson Thomas H. Avery served in the Spanish–American War as captain of C. Company, 14th Regiment.

== Career ==
=== Politics ===
From 1835 to 1845, Avery was a member of the 4th Ward in New York City. On September 15, 1835, representatives of the 4th Ward New Custom House and Post Office met at Eagle Hall, No. 8, Roosevelt Street. Alderman Whiting introduced a measure for the relocation of the Post Office. Avery was one of the members of this committee. By December 1837 he had become a secretary of the Democratic Republicans of the Fourth Ward. In December 1839, Avery became Chairman of the Democratic Republican Young Men of the Fourth Ward in New York City. He held the position of Chairman of the 4th Ward through 1854.

=== New York National Guard ===
Avery was a well-known New York Army National guardsman who became colonel, of the 8th Regiment, New York Army National Guard. In 1841, Avery first started out as a Major in command of the 3rd Field Artillery Regiment of the New York Army National Guard. On April 9, 1841, he was in command of the 3rd Regiment for the funeral ceromonies for president William Henry Harrison.

On June 18, 1845, Avery was part of the Washington Greys of the First Brigade of the 3rd Regiment for New York State Artillery. He was in charge of the officers in his division for a parade that started at City Hall on July 24 to pay respect to President Andrew Jackson, the late president of the United States.

On July 23, 1850, Avery was appointed special aid under the command of Captain Joshua A. Varian for General William Hall, who was Grand marshal, during the New York City funeral in honor of the late Zachary Taylor, 12th president of the United States. Avery was in the troop of cavalry in the First Division at the procession that moved from the Park and proceeded down Broadway, to Chatham Street to the Bowery; down to Union Square; and then in front of the City Hall.

His last appearance for the National Guard was on April 22, 1890, when he was in a parade, drill, and presentation of medals at the Park Avenue Armory building, also known as the 7th Regiment Armory, at 643 Park Avenue on the Upper East Side of Manhattan.

=== American Civil War ===
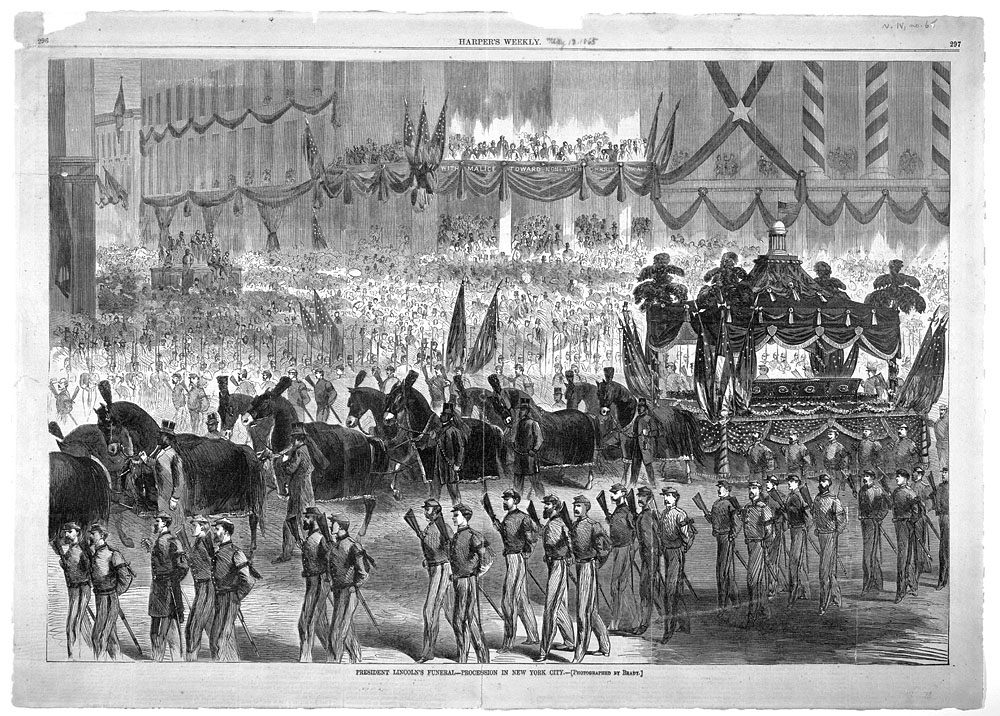
Lincoln funeral in New York City

At the beginning of the American Civil War, Avery was a commissioned lieutenant colonel who commanded the 8th Regiment National Guard Infantry (formerly the 8th Regiment, New York State Militia), known during the civil war as the "Washington Greys," Brooklyn, New York. He served from 1861 to 1863.

On April 24, 1865, after Abraham Lincoln, 16th president of the United States was assassinated, Colonel Avery was again appointed as special aid under the command of Captain Smith for Brigadier general Hall, who was Grand marshal, during the New York City funeral procession. Avery was in the troop of cavalry of the First Brigade, during the procession, which moved from City Hall to Broadway to Fourteenth-street; to Fifth-avenue; to Thirty-fourth-street; to Ninth-avenue, to the Hudson River Railroad Depot.

=== John W. Avery & Co. ===
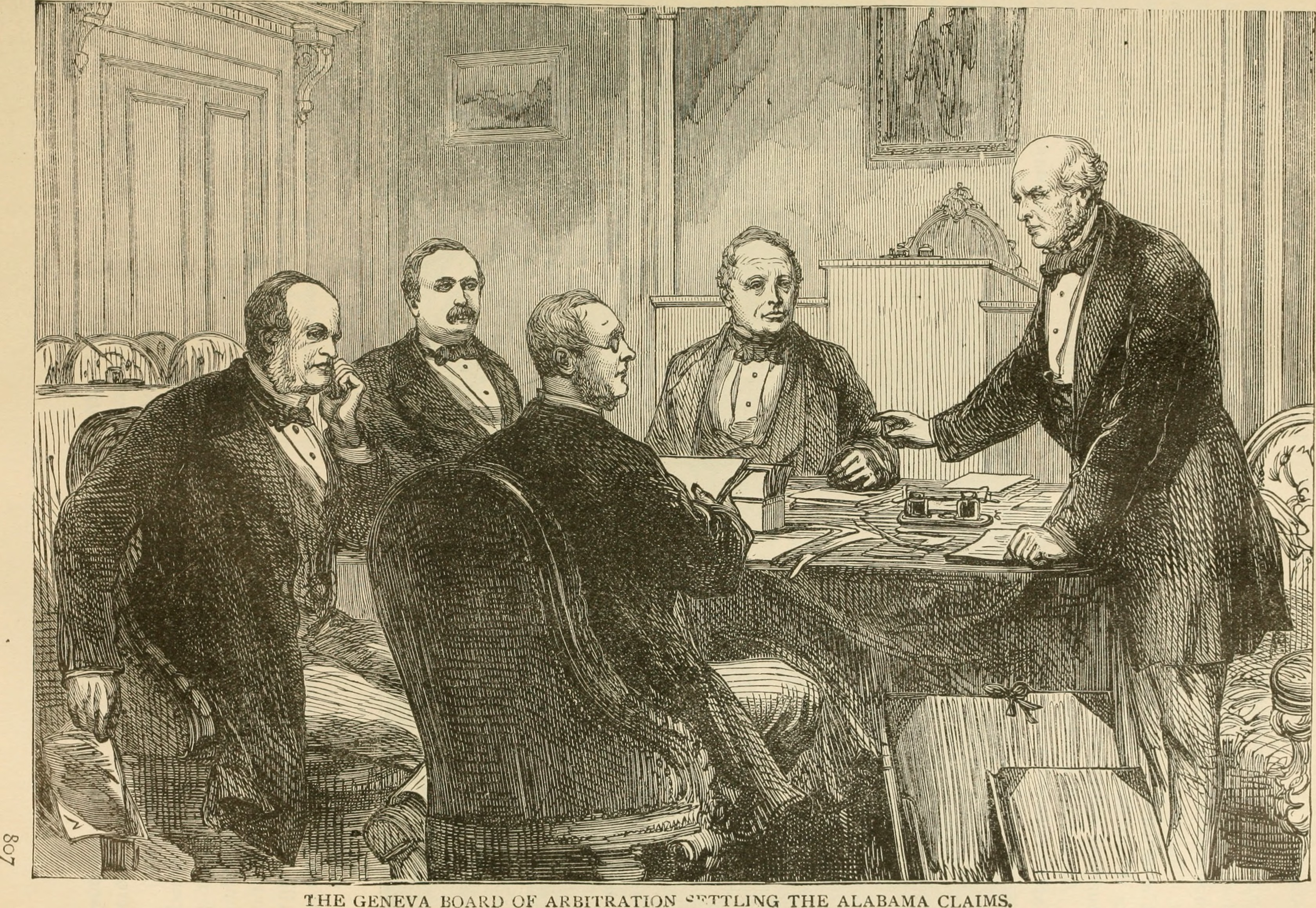
The Geneva Board of Arbitration settling the Alabama Claims.

After the Civil War, Avery started the John W. Avery & Co., a ship stores and general grocery business at 309 Water Street, New York City. He was a well-known merchant among the local Sandy Hook pilots. The store on Water Street had been for 40 years the regular "headquarters" for New York Sandy Hook pilots. At almost any time, up to a dozen of the pilots could be found lounging around there and exchanging stories of recent sailing adventures. He was collector and disburser for many pilots, collecting and disbursing their earnings. They would settle their accounts before they went to sea. Avery was also a merchant in Wolfeboro, New Hampshire.

Avery would often put ads in the local newspaper on behalf of the Sandy Hook pilots. For example, on February 7, 1863, Avery put an ad in the New York Daily Herald saying that a 16 foot yawl was lost or stolen from the pilot boat James M. Waterbury. The yawl was painted brown on the outside and yellow on the inside, with the name of "David Blackburn" branded on her. A reward for $10 was offered for her recovery. You would then reply to John W. Avery, at 309 Water Street.

During the American Civil War, the pilot boat William Bell, No. 24 was captured and burned by the Confederate raiding steamer the CSS Tallahassee. In the course of the Alabama Claims proceedings, Avery provided testimony to the U.S. Court of Commissioners on February 24, 1883, leveraging his familiarity with many Sandy Hook pilots. At 69 years old and residing in New York, Avery stated his occupation in the general grocery and ship stores business. He served as a collector and disbursing agent for numerous Sandy Hook pilots for over 50 years. Following the destruction of the William Bell by the Tallahassee, Avery managed the financial disbursements for the construction of the second William Bell. Throughout the deposition, he presented payment receipts for examination by the counsel of the United States. During the testimony, it was brought out that the William Bell and other pilot boats had a business manager who served as both a manager, banker, and supplier combined into one role. When the William Bell was launched on May 7, 1865, one of the final expenses recorded was for the customary "Sailing Party," where refreshments were provided by Avery himself.

Avery was vice-president of the East River Savings Bank.

== Death ==
Colonel Avery died at his home on March 24, 1891, in Brooklyn, New York, at the age of 76.
