= Elisha Taylor Baker =

American painter 1827–1890

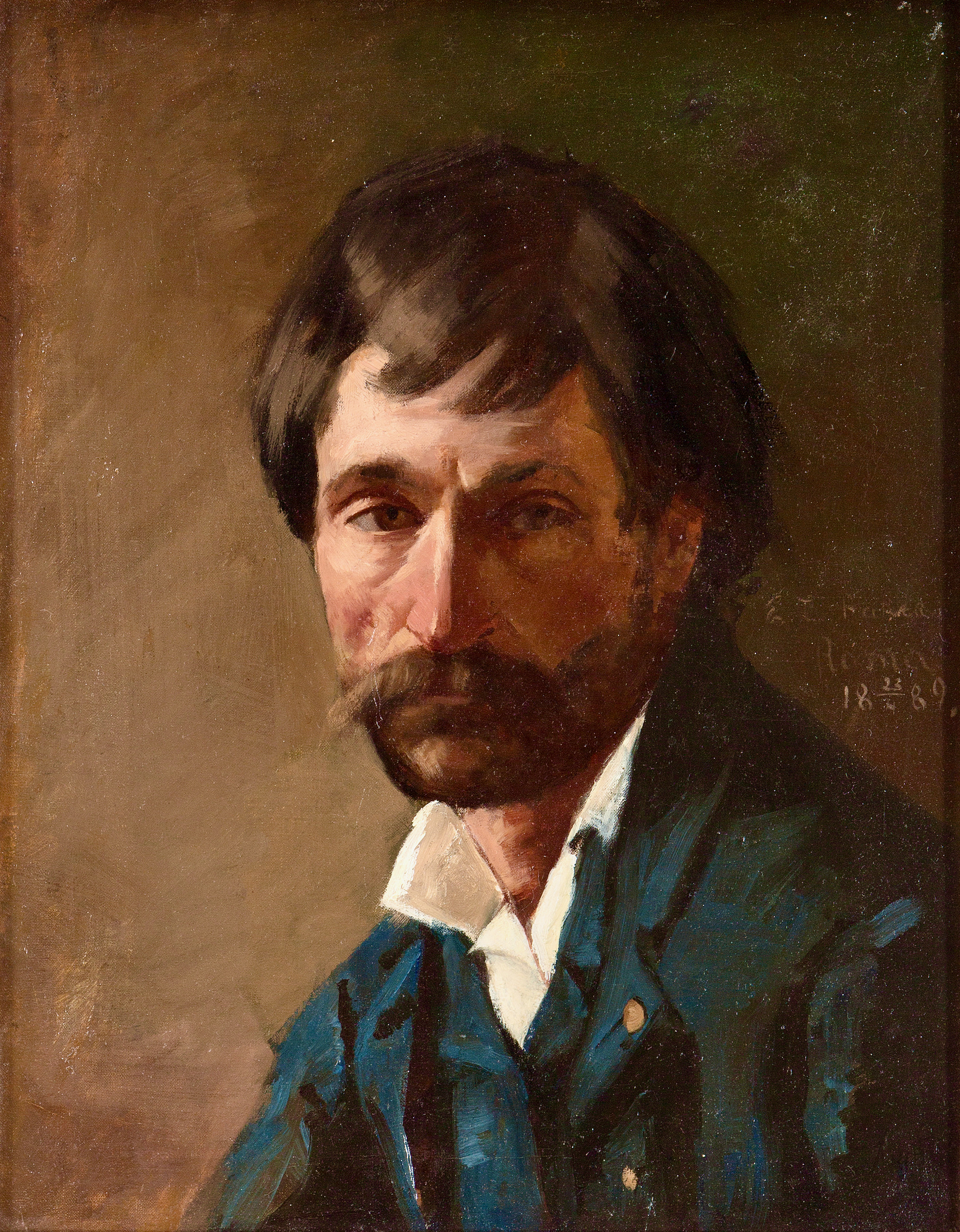
- Elisha Taylor Baker Self Portrait, 1889.
- Born: Elisha Taylor Baker; February 17, 1827; New York City, New York, U.S.
- Died: August 21, 1890 (aged 63); Orange, Connecticut, U.S.
- Resting place: Colchester, Connecticut, U.S.
- Known for: marine art
- Style: portraitist, luminist
- Spouse: Adelaide Brigg

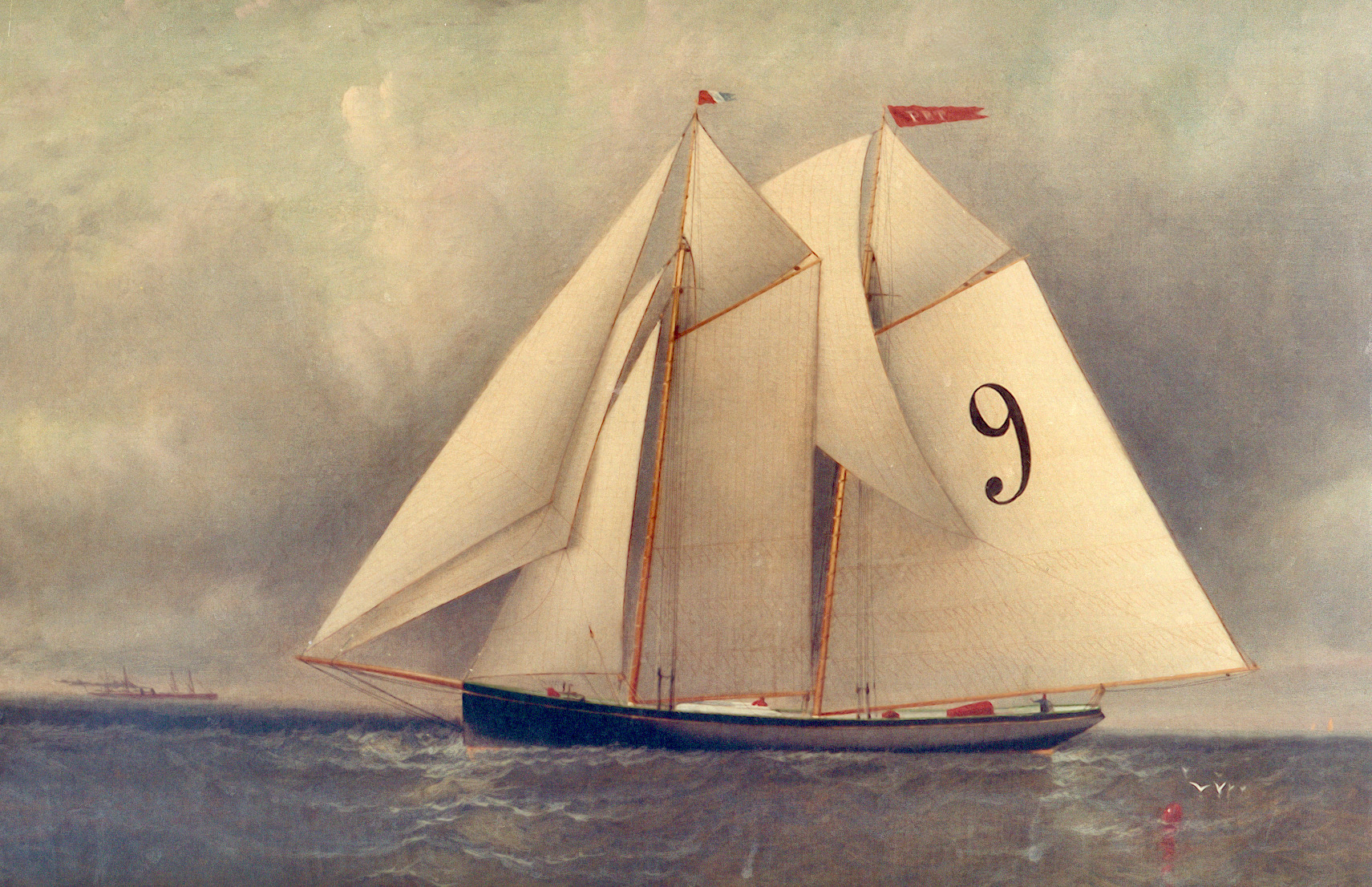
Pilot Boat Pet, No. 9

Elisha Taylor Baker (February 17, 1827 – 1890) was an American marine artist from New York City. He was a ship portraitist, luminist and landscape painter.

Baker painted full-rigged ships, yachts, steamboats and schooners. His works are in the art collections of the New Bedford Whaling Museum, the Mariners' Museum and Park, and the Mystic Seaport Museum.

== Early life ==
On March 10, 1851, he married Adelaide Brigg in Hebron, Connecticut. They had no children.

== Early career ==
Baker spent some time at sea in 1851. He worked in New York City as a marine painter from 1868 to 1880. He traveled around New England painting full-rigged ships, yachts, steamboats and coasting schooners. He painted some landscapes and marine artwork. One of his paintings is a John Jacob Astor IV steam yacht Nourmahal (ca. 1884) off Cowes. A business card listed him as: "Elisha T. Baker, Marine Painter, 315 Pearl & 104 South Sts., N.Y."

He signed his paintings in various ways: "E. T. Baker", "E. Taylor Baker" "E. T. B." or "Baker". To date, a total of twenty-four of his paintings exist. Eleven additional paintings have characteristics of his work but are unsigned. A surviving circa-1875 cloth-bound sketchbook exists with thirty-four pages with C. & R. Poillon's shipyard, Coney Island, landscapes, battlement towers, sloop at Sheepshead Bay, ice barge, Navesink Highlands, Plumb Island, Saybrook, fishing nets drying, harbors, Brooklyn Bridge tower unfinished, cityscapes with color notations, etc.

== Death ==
Baker died, at age 63, on August 21, 1890, in Orange, Connecticut. He was buried at the Linwood Cemetery in Colchester, Connecticut, on August 30.

== General references ==
- Falk, Peter Hastings (January 1, 1999). Who Was Who in American Art 1564–1975: 400 Years of Artists in America. Vol. 1. Sound View Press. p. 179.
- Granby, Alan; Hyland, Janice (2009). Flying the Colors: The Unseen Treasures of Nineteenth-century American Marine Art. Hudson Hills Press. pp. 31–32. ISBN 978-1-55595-351-5.
- Taylor, James (2005). Yachts on canvas : artists' images of yachts from the seventeenth century to the present day. London: Conway Maritime. p. 94. ISBN 978-1-84486-020-3.
- Smith, Rebecca (Autumn 1983). "An America's Cup Gallery". Nautical Quarterly. No. 23. p. 43. "This painting of Puritan, the fifth defender for the America's Cup, is one of 24 that either bears the monogram or signature of Elisha Taylor Baker..."
