= Thames Measurement =

Measurement system approximating the internal volume of a vessel

Thames Measurement, also known as Thames Tonnage, is a system for measuring ships and boats. It was created in 1855 as a variation of Builder's Old Measurement by the Royal Thames Yacht Club, and was designed for small vessels, such as yachts. It was originally used for calculating the port dues for yachts; the formula was also used in some early handicapping systems for yacht racing.

The calculation of Thames Tonnage uses the following formula:

$$\text{Thames Tonnage} = \frac {(\text{length}-\text{beam}) \times \text{beam} \times \frac {\text{beam}}{2}} {94}$$

where:

- length is the length, in feet, from the stempost to sternpost;
- beam is the maximum beam, in feet.

This can be simplified as:

$$\text{Thames Tonnage} = \frac {(\text{length}-\text{beam}) \times \text{beam}^2} {188}$$

== See also ==
- Tonnage – Measure of the volumetric capacity of a ship
