= Sylph (pilot boat) =

Sandy Hook Pilot boat

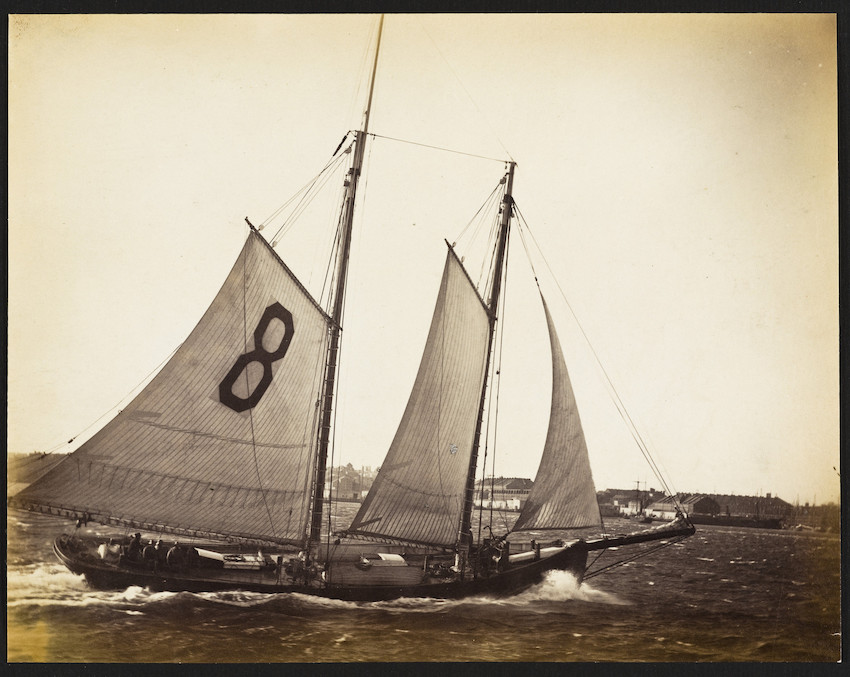
- Pilot schooner Sylph No. 8., photograph by Nathaniel Stebbins.

History

United States
- Name: Sylph
- Owner: A. Nash & Co., Joseph W. Colby
- Operator: Joseph W. Colby
- Builder: Nathaniel Porter Keen shipyard, North Weymouth, Massachusetts
- Launched: September 14, 1878
- Out of service: June 01, 1901
- Fate: Sold

General characteristics
- Class & type: schooner
- Tonnage: 61-tons TM
- Length: 71 ft 5 in (21.77 m)
- Beam: 21 ft 0 in (6.40 m)
- Depth: 7 ft 8 in (2.34 m)
- Propulsion: Sail

The Sylph was a 19th-century pilot boat first built in 1834, by Whitmore & Holbrook for John Perkins Cushing as a Boston yacht and pilot-boat for merchant and ship owner Robert Bennet Forbes. She won the first recorded American yacht race in 1835. She was a pilot boat in the Boston Harbor in 1836 and 1837 and sold to the New York and Sandy Hook Pilots in October 1837. She was lost in winter of 1857 with all hands during a blizzard off Barnegat, New Jersey. The second Sylph was built in 1865 from a half-model by Dennison J. Lawlor. The third Sylph was built in 1878 at Nathaniel Porter Keen Shipyard on the Fore River in North Weymouth, Massachusetts for Boston Pilots. She was sold out of service in 1901, after 23 years of Boston pilot service.

== Construction and service ==
=== First Sylph (1834-1857) ===
The pilot-boat Sylph owned by China merchant and ship owner Captain Robert Bennet Forbes. She was built in Boston in 1834 by Whitmore & Holbrook shipyard for John Perkins Cushing. Forbes supervised her construction of the schooner.

According to Samuel Eliot Morison, the Sylph won the first recorded American yacht race on August 3, 1835. The race was held at Martha's Vineyard and sponsored by the Southern Massachusetts Yacht Racing Association, between the ninety-two foot yacht Wave, owned by John Cox Stevens and the sixty-foot yacht Sylph. The race started off Vineyard Sound, then around Block Island and finished off Naushon Island. William Carlton Fowler took charge of the pilot-boat Sylph, and skippered the Sylph at the 1835 yacht race.

The Sylph was a pilot boat in the Boston Harbor between 1836 and 1837 and then sold to the New Jersey Sandy Hook Pilots in October, 1837.

The New Jersey Sylph, No. 1, was lost on March 2, 1857, with all hands during a blizzard off Barnegat, New Jersey. Pilots Daniel Lane, John H. Lane, a brother, William Glyun, and William Champlain were lost. Two of her pilots, Charles E. Warren and Isaish Harlan boarded ships before the storm.

=== Second Sylph (1865) ===
The Boston fishing schooner Sylph was built in 1865 from a half-model by Dennison J. Lawlor. She was launched on May 22, 1865, Meg McManus (Aunt of Thomas F. McManus) and Kate Leonard, christened the new schooner Sylph at her launch at Bucks Wharf in Chelsea, Massachusetts. She was 55.8 feet long with a beam of 17.5 feet and 30.24 tons.

On November 9, 1883, the Sylph sank in a winter storm on Georges Bank with all hands.

=== Third Sylph, No. 8 (1878) ===
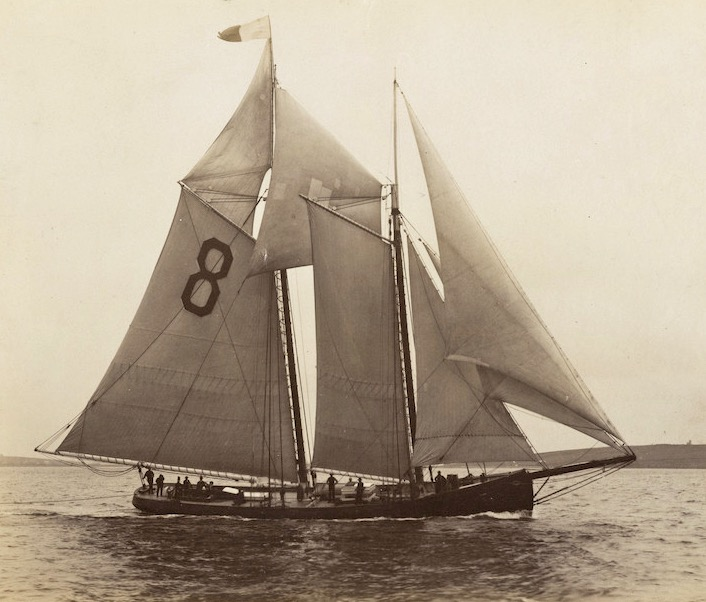
Sylph pilot boat with all her sails.

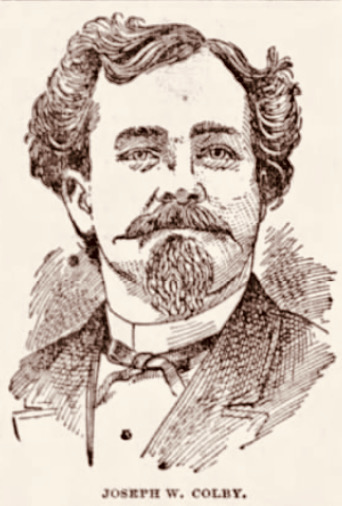
Pilot Joseph W. Colby

The Boston pilot-boat Sylph, No. 8, was launched on September 14, 1878, from Keen's shipyard in North Weymouth, Massachusetts. The shipyard was founded by Nathaniel Porter Keen who was a ship, yacht, and boat builder.

The new Sylph was commanded by Captain Joseph H. Wilson. She was registered with the Record of American and Foreign Shipping from 1881 to 1898 to J. H. Wilson as master and to A. Nash & Co. as owners. She belonged to the port of Boston.

On April 30, 1885, the pilot-boat Sylph, No. 8, was cruising off the Middle Bank, twenty-five miles east of Boston. Second boatkeeper, Charles Sands was swept away in a terrible storm.

On May 23, 1896, the pilot-boat Sylph, No. 8, towed fishing sloop Main Girl of Gloucester. Captain Joseph W. Colby of the Sylph, picked up the fishing boat ten miles east of Highland Light as her rigging had fallen to pieces with no sail.

On February 17, 1899, the pilot-boat Sylph, No. 8, arrived in the Boston port after being blown off shore by gales and not been heard from for over a week. Captain James H. Reid Jr., of the America, No. 1, spotted her forty miles outside the Boston Light, and reported the news. In May of the same year, pilot-boat Sylph, No. 8, rescued the naphtha launch Tirzah, forty-five miles southeast of the Boston Light. Captain Joseph Colby, of the Sylph towed the boat into Boston.

In November 1899, many transatlantic liners were used as supply ships during the South African wars, which caused some of the Boston pilot-boats to be placed out of commission. Captain Colby of the pilot-boat Sylph, and the pilot-boat Minerva were moved to East Boston.

In 1900, Boston had seven pilots boats in commission. The Sylph was Boston's pilot schooner number eight. The other Boston boats included, the America, No. 1; Liberty, No. 3; Adams, No. 4; Hesper, No. 5; Varuna, No. 6; and Minerva, No. 7.

== End of service ==
When the Boston pilots reorganized down to five boats, the pilot-boat Sylph was sold out of service on June 1, 1901, to Captain Burgess of the Metropolitan coal company. She had been in the Boston pilot service for twenty-three years. She was owned and commanded by Captain Joseph Colby, one of the best known Boston pilots.

== See also ==
- List of Northeastern U. S. Pilot Boats
