= Minerva (pilot boat) =

Boston Pilot boat

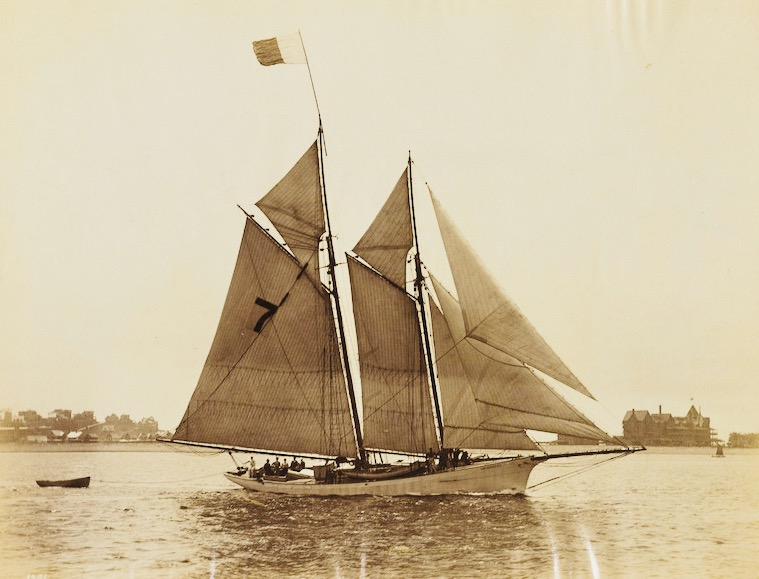
- Boston Pilot Boat Minerva Pilot Boat, by Nathaniel Stebbins, c. 1896

History

United States
- Name: Minerva
- Owner: Franklin B. Wellock
- Operator: Bruce B. McLean, Watson Shields Dolliver
- Builder: Ambrose A. Martin
- Launched: February 4, 1896
- Out of service: 1901
- Fate: Sold

General characteristics
- Class & type: schooner
- Tonnage: 50-tons TM
- Length: 79 ft 0 in (24.08 m)
- Beam: 20 ft 0 in (6.10 m)
- Draft: 10 ft 6 in (3.20 m)
- Depth: 10 ft 0 in (3.05 m)
- Propulsion: Sail
- Notes: White oak and yellow pine; Richardson steering gear, Edson giber and diaphragm pump.

Minerva was a 19th-century Boston pilot boat built in 1896 by Ambrose A. Martin of East Boston, Massachusetts. She was owned by Franklin B. Wellock who was a Boston pilot for more than 55 years. The pilot-boat was named for his daughter, Minerva Hill. She was sold to Plymouth parties in 1901 to be used as a fishing vessel.

== Construction and service ==
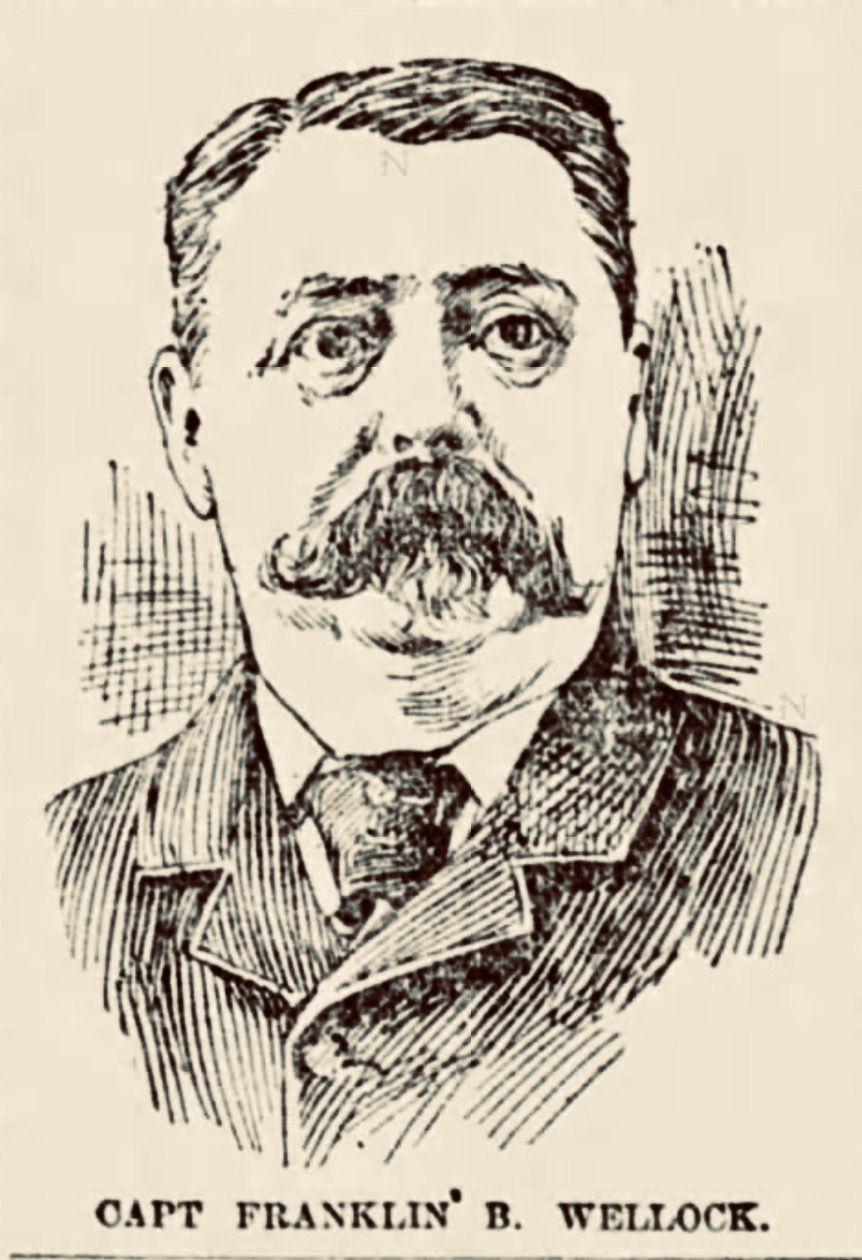
Captain Franklin B. Wellock, c. 1896

Minerva No. 7, was built in East Boston, Massachusetts in 1896 for Franklin B. Wellock. The Minerva, was named for his daughter. She was designed and built by Ambrose A. Martin, who built the Columbia, Eben D. Jordan, and Friend. She was launched on February 4, 1896, from the Ambrose Martin shipyard at Jeffries Point.

Minerva took her trial trip on March 14, 1896, from the National dock at East Boston. Captain Franklin B. Wellock was in command. On her way out of Boston Harbor she sailed past Fort Warren, Fort Winthrop and then the Brewsters. The crew of the new boat consisted of Captain Franklin B. Wellock, pilots McField, Watson Shields Dolliver, and Bruce B. McLean, boatkeeper Samuel Wellock, three sailors, and the steward.

On March 29, 1899, the pilot-boat Minerva, No. 7, helped rescue passengers on the Warren Line steamship Norseman, that went ashore off Marblehead, Massachusetts when it was headed for Boston.

In November 1899, many transatlantic liners were used as supply ships during the South African wars, which caused some of the Boston pilot-boats to be placed out of commission. Captain Colby of the pilot-boat Sylph, and the pilot-boat Minerva were moved to East Boston.

In 1900, Boston had seven pilots boats in commission. The Minerva was Boston's pilot schooner number seven. The other Boston boats included, the America, No. 1; Liberty, No. 3; Adams, No. 4; Hesper, No. 5; Varuna, No. 6; and Sylph, No 8.

== End of service ==
In 1901, pilot-boat Minerva was sold to Plymouth, Massachusetts parties to be used as a fishing vessel. On October 12, 1901, on her first trip as a fishing boat, Captain Al Watson landed 20,000 pounds of haddock, cod, and hake.

== See also ==
- List of Northeastern U. S. Pilot Boats
