= Adams (pilot boat) =

Boston Pilot boat

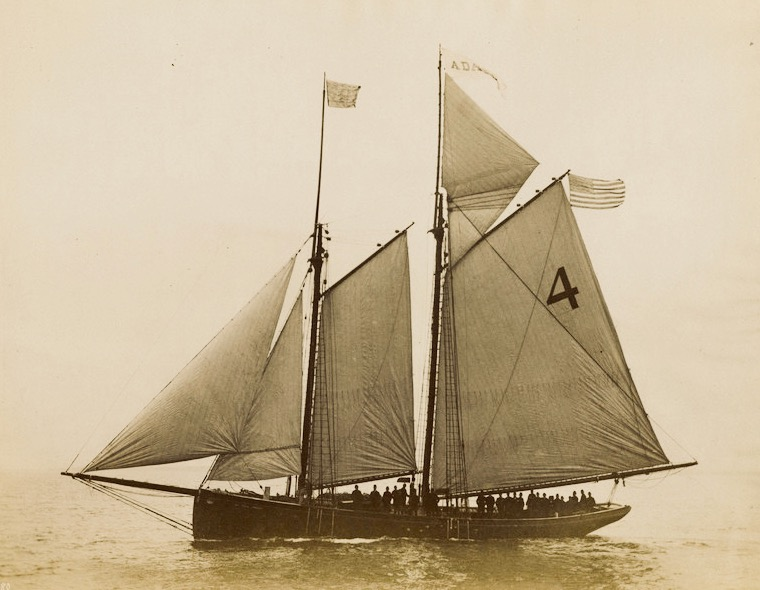
- Boston pilot boat Adams, No. 4 (painting by Nathaniel Stebbins.

History

United States
- Name: Adams
- Namesake: Melvin O. Adams, American attorney and railroad executive
- Owner: Captain John H. Jeffries
- Operator: John H. Jeffries
- Builder: Moses Adams at Essex, Massachusetts
- Cost: $13,000
- Launched: 24 September 1889
- Out of service: 29 May 1912
- Fate: Sold

General characteristics
- Class & type: schooner
- Tonnage: 150-tons TM
- Length: 88 ft 0 in (26.82 m)
- Beam: 22 ft 0 in (6.71 m)
- Depth: 11 ft 0 in (3.35 m)
- Propulsion: Sail

Adams was a 19th-century Boston pilot boat, built in 1888 by Moses Adams at Essex, Massachusetts for Captain John H. Jeffries. She was named for Melvin O. Adams, an American attorney and railroad executive. Her design was by yacht designer Edward Burgess, known for his America's Cup defenders. In 1901, she was one of only five pilot-boats left in the Boston fleet. In 1912, she was sold to haul gravel to Boston, then sold again where she landed in the Portuguese immigrant trade. She was sunk by enemy action during World War I.

== Construction and service ==
Boston pilot boat Adams, was built in 1888 by Moses Adams at Essex, Massachusetts for Captain John H. Jeffries and others. She was named in honor of the prominent Bostonian, Melvin O. Adams. Her design was by the American yacht designer, Edward Burgess, known for his America's Cup defenders, Puritan (1885), Mayflower (1886), and Volunteer (1887).

On September 24, 1889, the new pilot boat Adams, was launched and witnessed by a large gathering of people. Her dimensions were 88 feet (27 m) in length by 22 feet (6.7 m) in width, with 11 feet (3.4 m) in depth; and 150 tons. She cost $13,000.

On March 3, 1890, Captain Jeffries of the new pilot boat Adams, No. 4, beat the Hesper, No. 5, in a race from Boston Light, to board an incoming steamer. Each captain wanted to earn $125 by placing a pilot on board the vessel.

In 1900, Boston had seven pilots boats in commission. The Adams was Boston's pilot schooner number four. The other Boston boats included, the America, No. 1; Liberty, No. 3; Hesper, No. 5; Varuna, No. 6; Minerva, No. 7; and Sylph, No 8.

On April 29, 1900, Captain Thomas McLaughlin, D. Kendrick, F. C. Lefray, W. S. Dolliver, and S. J. Treat were pilots on the Adams, No. 4.

== End of service ==
In 1901, Adams was one of only five pilot-boat schooners left in the Boston fleet. She was withdrawn from the Pilots' Association service in May 1912.

In November 1912, Adams was sold to Captain Frank D. McCarthy of East Boston man for $1,400. He used her to haul gravel from Maine to Boston. She then landed in the Portuguese immigrant trade. She was sunk by enemy action during World War I.

== See also ==
- List of Northeastern U. S. Pilot Boats
