= America (pilot boat) =

Sandy Hook Pilot boat

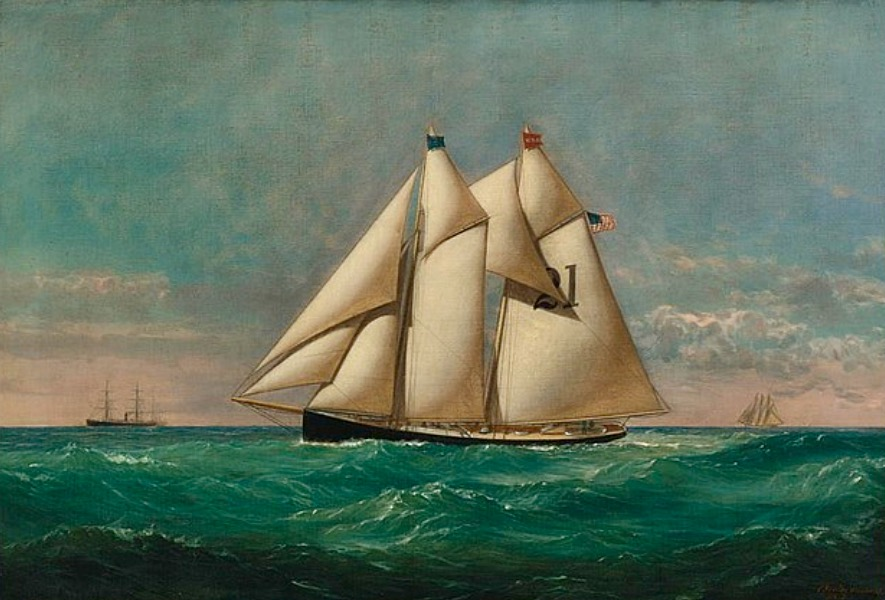
- New York pilot schooner America, No. 21, with owner's flag "W.H.A.", painting by Conrad Freitag

History

United States
- Name: America
- Owner: N. Y. Pilots; Captain Weaver; Walter Brewer
- Operator: James Jackson; Edward Develin; A. H. Murphy, Jr.
- Launched: October 25, 1880
- Christened: October 25, 1880
- Out of service: February 1, 1896
- Fate: Sold

General characteristics
- Class & type: Schooner
- Tonnage: 75-tons TM
- Length: 79 ft 8 in (24.28 m)
- Beam: 21 ft 1 in (6.43 m)
- Draft: 75 ft 0 in (22.86 m)
- Depth: 8 ft 9 in (2.67 m)
- Propulsion: Sail

The America, No. 21 was a 19th-century pilot boat built in 1880 for the New York City and Sandy Hook Pilots. She was a replacement for the William H. Aspinwall, No. 21, that was lost off Point Judith, Rhode Island in 1880. She weathered the Great Blizzard of 1888. In the time of steam, the America was sold in 1896 by the New York Pilots. A new pilot-boat America was built in 1897 for Captain James H. Reid of Boston and designed from the line drawings by Thomas F. McManus of Boston. After serving 21 years in the Boston Pilots' Association, the America was sold to David W. Simpson of Boston in 1918.

== Construction and service ==
=== America No. 21 ===
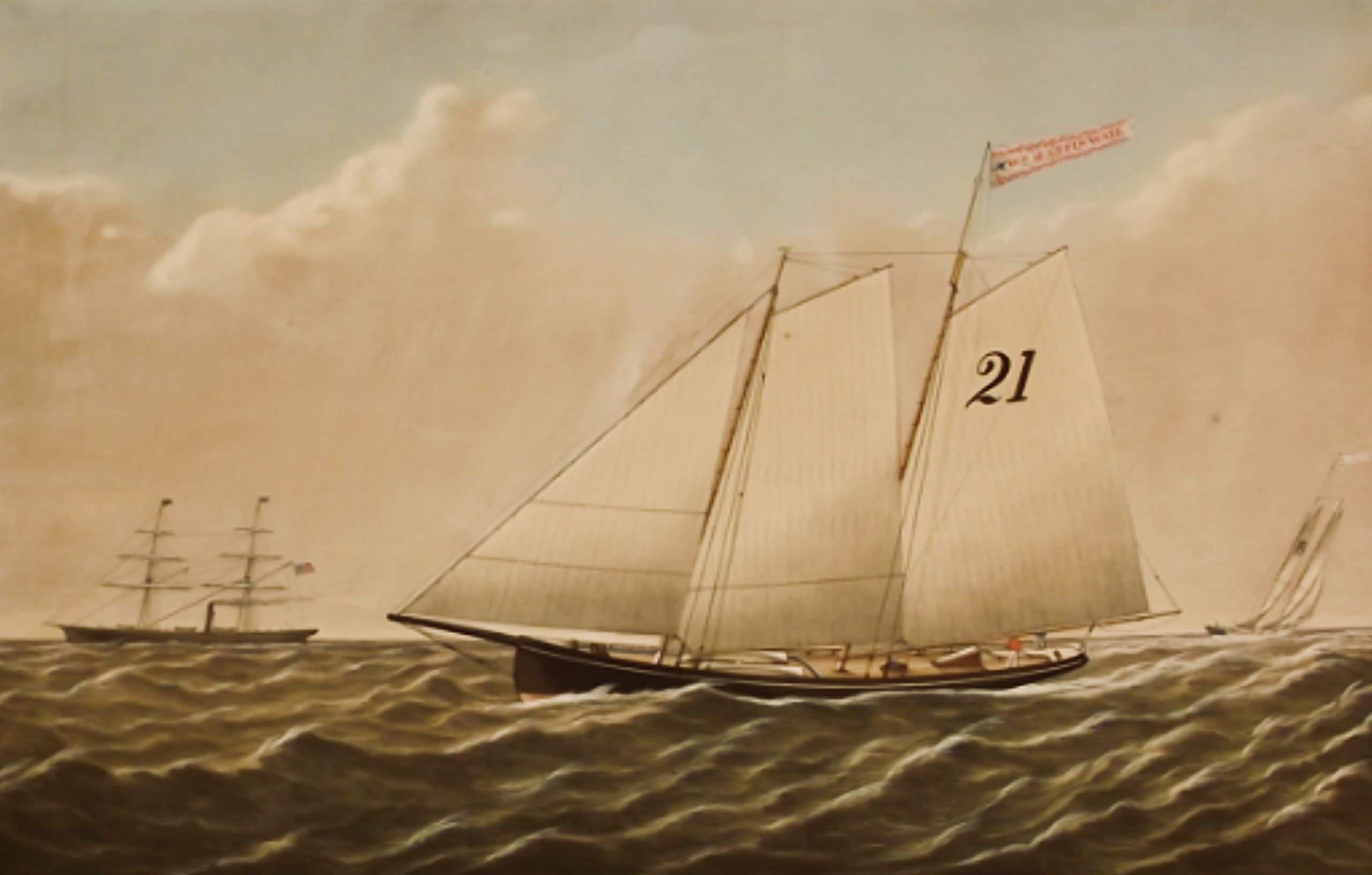
William H. Aspinwall was replaced by America.

On October 25, 1880, a new pilot boat, America, No. 21 was launched for the New York Pilots as a replacement for the William H. Aspinwall, No. 21, that was lost in 1880, off Point Judith, Rhode Island. Belle Dunning broke a champagne bottle over the vessel's bow during the launch. The owners were Captain Weaver and Walter Brewer of New York.

The pilot-boat America, No. 21, was registered with the Record of American and Foreign Shipping from 1882 to 1900 to the N.Y. Pilots as owners and Walter Brewer as captain. She was listed as being built in Bath, Maine, by the Goss & Sawyer shipyard in 1880. She was 79.8 feet long and 75-tons.

Captain Joseph Henderson was attached to the pilot boat, America, No. 21, in the Great Blizzard of 1888, and at the time of his death on October 8, 1890. During the blizzard, the America was cruising off Fire Island when she got caught up in the winter storm, but came safely into port.

On May 17, 1895, the Life Savers' Benevolent Association presented gold medals and money to the crew of the pilot-boat America No. 21, for saving the crew of nine men off the American schooner Rose Esterbrook. Pilots James Jackson, Edward Develin, and Henry Hoiz received gold medals.

On July 23, 1988, A. H. Murphy Jr. of the pilot boat America No. 21, met Captain Andrews of the Dark Secret, 432 miles out from New York, who feel into bad weather and had to return to the New York harbor.

=== End of service ===
On February 1, 1896, the New York Pilots discarded sixteen sailboats and moved them to the Erie Basin in Brooklyn. They were replaced with steam pilot boats. The America, was sold for $5,500.

On April 19, 1897, a new America, No. 1 was built for Captain James H. Reid, of Boston and designed from the line drawings by Thomas F. McManus of Boston. She was launched from the shipyard of John Bishop of Gloucester, Massachusetts. Pilots James H. Reid Jr., and Bruce B. McLean were assigned to the new boat.

== See also ==
- List of Northeastern U.S. pilot boats
