= Bruce Boutlier McLean =

Bruce B. McLean, Sandy Hook Pilot

Bruce B. McLean
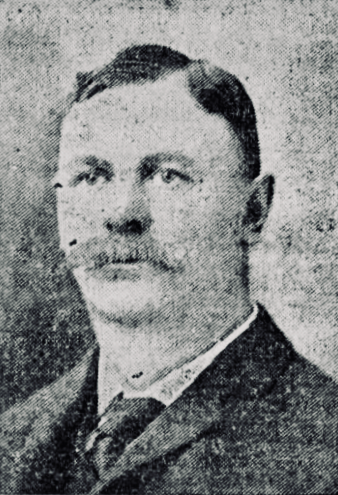
- Captain Bruce B. McLean (photo by Horner of the Boston Post).
- Born: August 1858; Hubbards, Nova Scotia
- Died: January 24, 1930 (aged 71); Everett, Massachusetts, US
- Occupation: Maritime pilot
- Spouse: Laura Janet Rutledge
- Children: 3

Captain Bruce Boutlier McLean (August 1858 – June 24, 1930) was a 19th-century Boston maritime pilot, best known for being a pilot on the pilot boat America. He was a leader among the branch pilots of Boston for 35 years. McLean was a pilot and owner of the pilot boat Liberty. He died in Everett, Massachusetts, in 1930.

== Career ==
McLean went out to sea at an early age. He received his pilot commission on March 13, 1895.

McLean was a pilot on the pilot boat Minerva when she took her trial trip from the National dock at East Boston on March 14, 1896.

McLean knew many of the Boston pilots. On October 1, 1906, he went to the funeral of his friend Captain James L. Smith who died, at age 56 at his home in Arlington, Massachusetts.

=== America ===
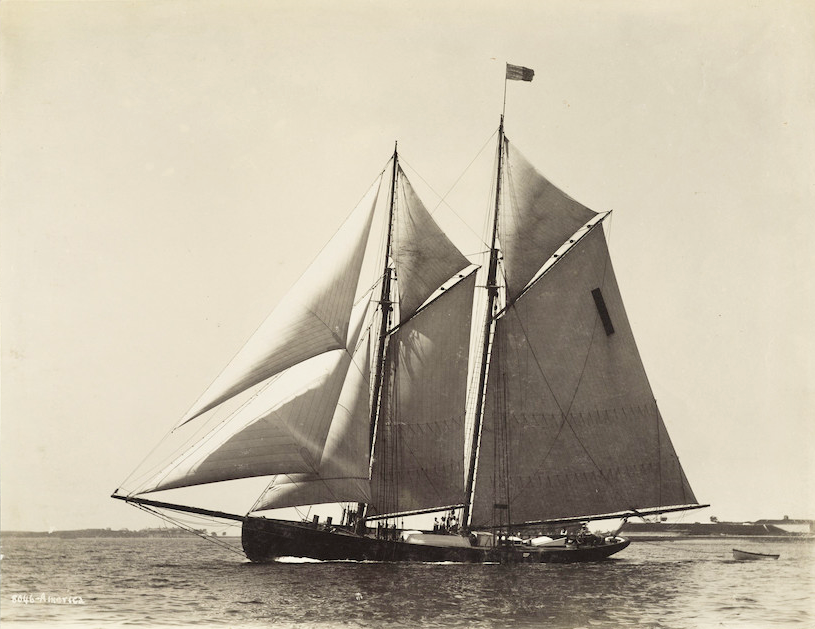
Pilot Boat America, No. 1

McLean was best known for being a pilot on the pilot boat America, No. 1. Pilots McLean and James H. Reid, Jr., were assigned to the new boat when she was launched from the shipyard of John Bishop of Gloucester, Massachusetts on March 9, 1897.

On April 1, 1898, Captain McLean was in command of the pilot boat America when he rescued the crew of the Nova Scotia vessel Genius, 18 miles off the Boston Light. The rescued men were transferred from the America to the pilot-boat Hesper, No. 5.

On December 10, 1898, Pilot McLean, cruising on the America, No. 1, and boarding the steamship Linchenden from Nicaragua, reported seeing part of the wreckage from the ship Virginian, which was 14 miles from the Highland Light, off cape Cod. He could see the letters Virginian on the stern of the wreckage. She ship was lost at sea with all on board.

In 1900, the pilot boat Louise, No. 2 was owned by Bruce McLean, Joseph Fawcett, John Fawcett, William V. Abbott and Watson S. Dolliver.

=== Liberty ===
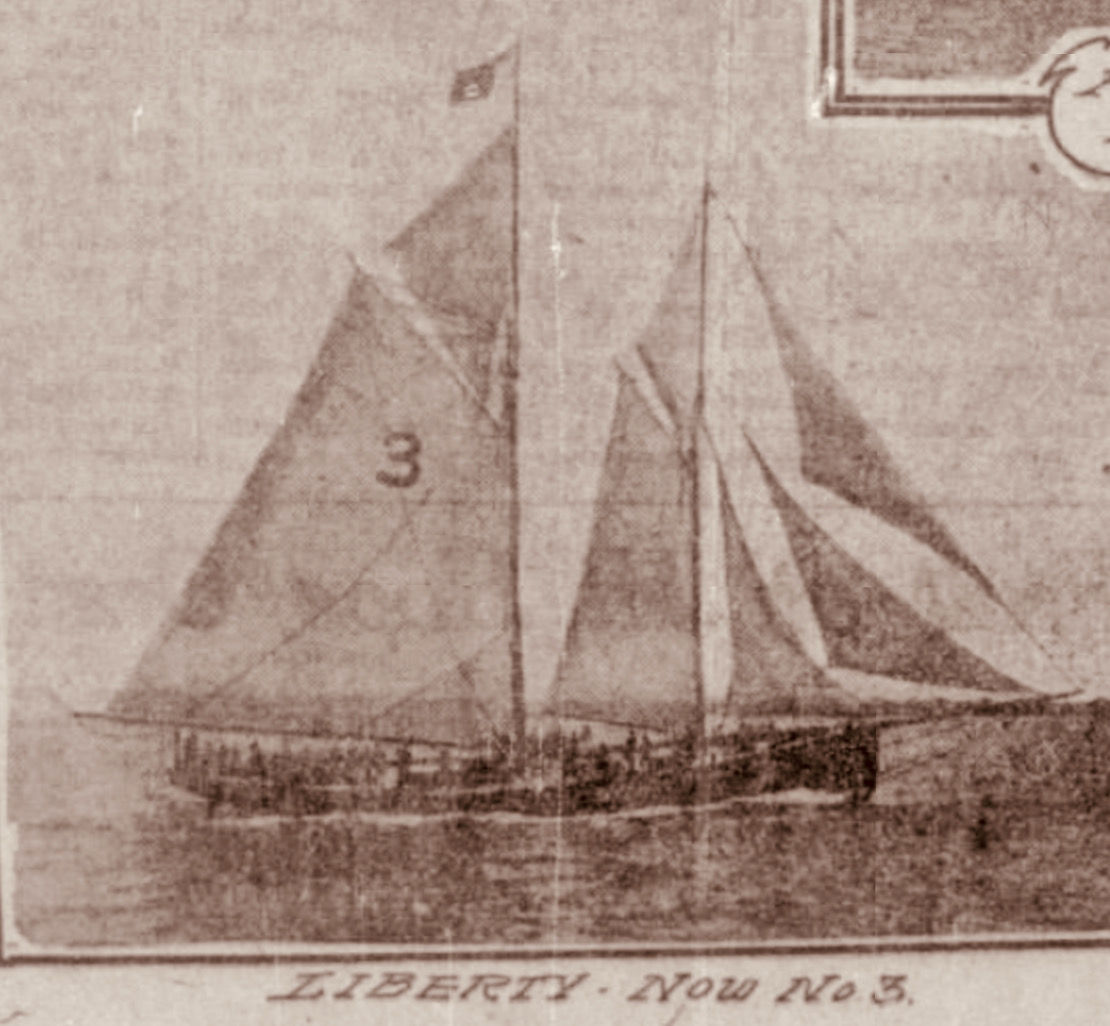
Liberty pilot boat, No. 3.

On April 10, 1902, McLean was a pallbearer at the funeral for Captain E. G. Martin. along with James M. Murdock, John H. Low, C. K. Nelson, F. J. Gevalt, and William McMillian. They were also pilots of the Captain Martin's pilot boat Liberty, No. 3.

On May 4, 1917, a model of the pilot boat Liberty was presented by the pilots of Boston Harbor. McLean helped to produce the model.

On December 25, 1918, Captain McLean boarded the four-masted Norwegian bark Skansen I, and told the captain and crew that World War I had ended. The vessel had been out at sea and was not aware of the signing of the Armistice on November 11, 1918.

== Death ==
McLean died on June 24, 1930, in Everett, Massachusetts, at age 71 years. Funeral services were at his late residence.

== See also ==
- List of Northeastern U. S. Pilot Boats
