= America (1897) =

Boston Pilot boat

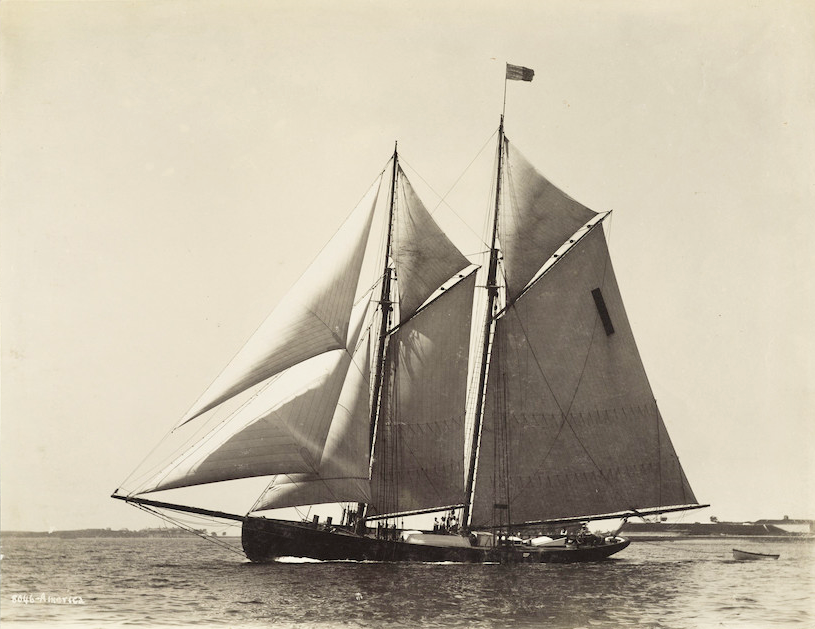
- Boston Pilot Boat America, No. 1, photograph by Nathaniel Stebbins.

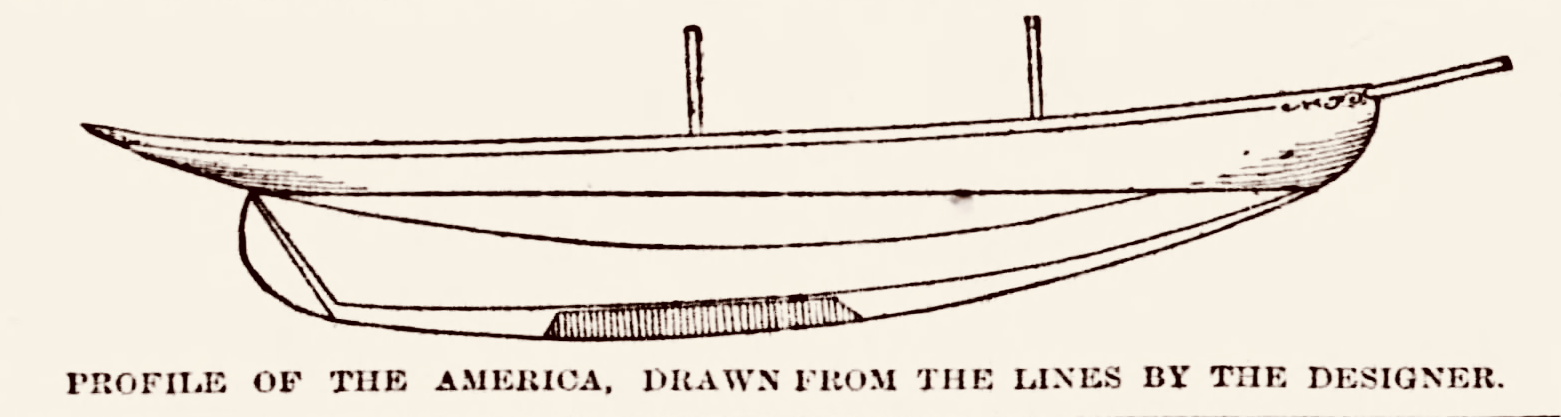
- Profile of the America, drawn from the lines by the designer Thomas F. McManus.

Development
- Designer: Thomas F. McManus
- Location: United States
- Year: April 19, 1897
- Builder: John Bishop
- Role: Pilot boat
- Name: America

Boat
- Crew: Bruce B. McLean, James H. Reid Jr.
- Draft: 12 ft 6 in (3.81 m)

Hull
- Construction: White oak
- Hull weight: 97-tons TM
- LOA: 101 ft 0 in (30.78 m)
- LOH: 85 ft 0 in (25.91 m)
- Beam: 23 ft 0 in (7.01 m)

Hull appendages
- Keel: Iron
- Ballast: 10 ft 6 in (3.20 m)

Rig
- Mast height: 79 m (259 ft) Mainmast
- Rig other: 40 m (130 ft) Topmast

Racing
- Class association: Schooner

The America, No. 1 was a 19th-century American pilot boat built in 1897 for Captain James H. Reid Sr. of Boston and designed by Boston designer Thomas F. McManus. The Boston America did not resemble her famous namesake, yacht America, rather she was designed with a fishing schooner "Indian header" bow. After serving 21 years in the Boston Pilots' Association, the America was sold to David W. Simpson of Boston in 1918.

== Construction and service ==
On January 18, 1897, the iron keel for the pilot boat America weighting six tons, was taken by a six-horse team to John Bishop's shipyard at Vincent's point, in Gloucester, Massachusetts.

On February 28, 1897, Boston's new pilot boat America was on the stocks at the John Bishop's shipyard. She was designed by Thomas F. McManus of Boston for Captain James H. Reid Sr. of Boston. Reid was the principal owner and formally of the pilot boat Florence. She had the new design from which other boats tested their speed.

On April 19, 1897, America was launched from the shipyard of John Bishop of Gloucester. Pilots James H. Reid Jr. and Captain Bruce B. McLean were assigned to the new boat. She went on her trial trip down the Boston Harbor on May 19, 1897, with 50 guests. Her dimensions were 101 feet overall, 85 feet length on waterline, 23 foot beam, depth of hold 10 feet 6 inches. She was built of white oak frame planking and fastened with galvanized iron and bolts and spikes below the waterline.

The Boston America did not resemble her famous namesake, rather she was designed with a fishing schooner 'Indian head' bow.

On July 8, 1897, the pilot-boat America was in the Fisherman's Race against the fishing schooner James S. Steele. The race went along Long Island. The America beat the James S. Steele by three minutes. Pilot Bruce McLean took the place of Captain James Reid who was on the battleship USS Massachusetts. In December, of the same year, Captain Reid of America, No. 1, won another Fisherman's Race against pilot-boat No. 2 and the schooner Harry L. Belden.

On April 1, 1898, the Boston pilot-boat America rescued the crew of the Nova Scotia vessel Genius, 18 miles off the Boston Light. The rescued men were transferred from the America to the pilot-boat Hesper, No. 5.

In 1900, Boston had seven pilots boats in commission. The America was Boston's pilot schooner number one. The other Boston boats included, the Liberty, No. 3; Adams, No. 4; Hesper, No. 5; Varuna, No. 6; Minerva, No. 7; and Sylph, No 8.

On January 20, 1902, Pilot Benny Nelson, of the pilot boat America No. 1, brought in a Dominion Line steamer New England.

On August 22, 1901, pilot Joseph W. Colby of the pilot boat America, No. 1, brought into Long Wharf the fruit steamer Admiral Schley through a thick fog 140 miles from the South Shoal lightship.

The pilot boat America No. 1, was used as a lightship station boat. Captain James Reid boarded the Warren liner Sagamore, from the America station boat on November 3, 1901.

When the Boston pilots reorganized in 1901, down to five boats, the pilot-boat America was one of the boats that continued in the service. Captain Reid was with the America, and piloted the last vessel under the old system.

On April 29, 1902, Boston pilot-boat America, No. 1, carried the ashes of Captain Franklin Fowler, encased in a small rosewood box, at the National Dock wharf, East Boston. Captain James H. Reid was in attendance on the deck of the America during the memorial.

== End of service ==
On December 29, 1918, after serving 21 years in the Boston Pilots' Association, the America was sold to David W. Simpson of Boston. The America had been laid up at the National Dock for the past 2 years.

== Gallery ==
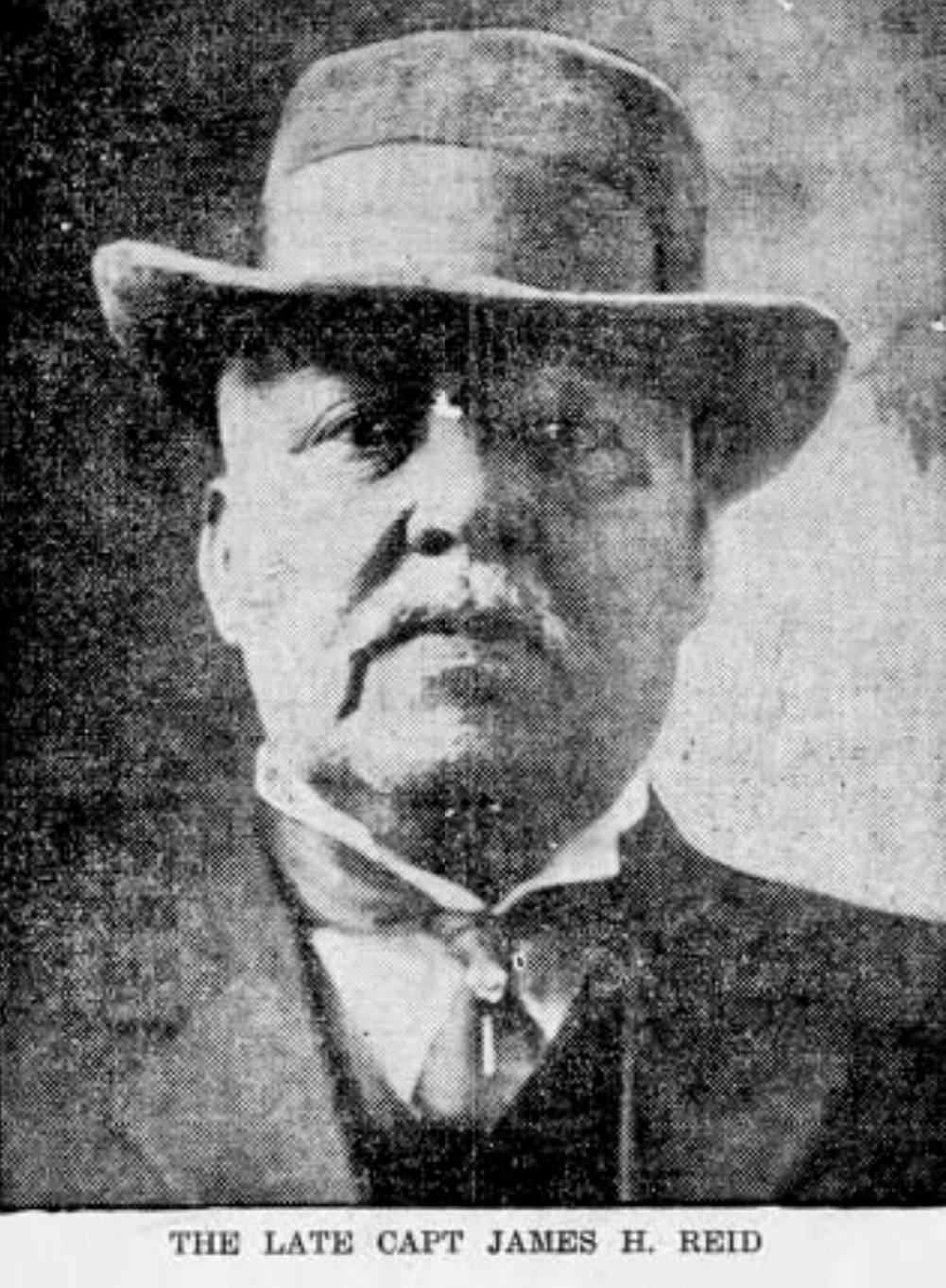
Owner Captain James H. Reid

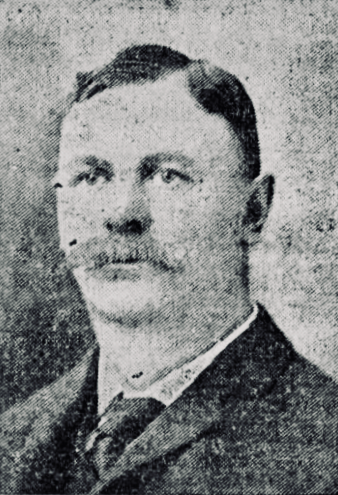
Boston Pilot Captain Bruce Boutlier McLean

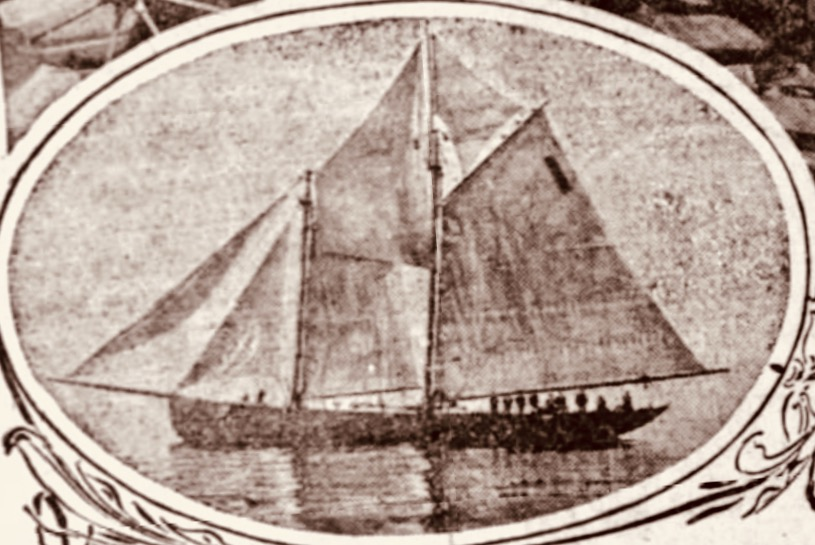
Boston Pilot Boat America

== See also ==
- List of Northeastern U. S. Pilot Boats
