= Florence (pilot boat) =

Boston Pilot boat

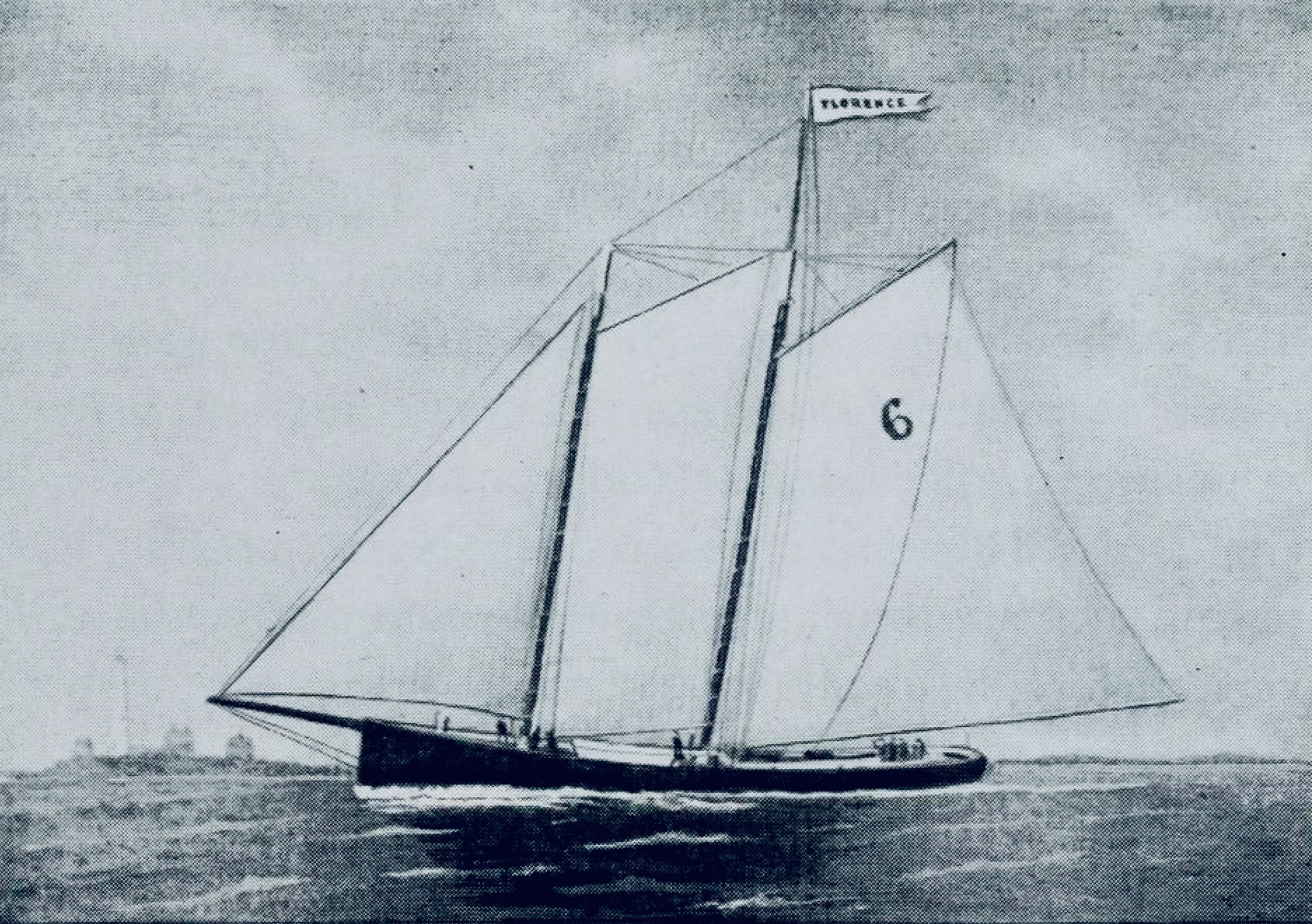
- Boston Pilot Boat Florence No. 6, c. 1867.

History

United States
- Name: Florence
- Owner: E. Bruce, William C. Fowler
- Operator: James H. Reid, James Llewellyn Smith
- Builder: Dennison J. Lawlor
- Launched: 1867
- Out of service: June 1897
- Fate: Sold

General characteristics
- Class & type: schooner
- Tonnage: 50-tons TM
- Length: 66 ft 5 in (20.24 m)
- Beam: 7 ft 0 in (2.13 m)
- Draft: 20 ft 0 in (6.10 m)
- Depth: 7 ft 7 in (2.31 m)
- Propulsion: Sail
- Notes: Her cabin had ground glass in the doors bearing the name, Florence.

Florence was a 19th-century Boston pilot boat built in 1867 from a model by Dennison J. Lawlor for William C. Fowler. The vessel had a reputation for being fast under sail. She had a long career in the Boston service, skippered by many famous pilots. She was the oldest pilot-boat in the service. In 1897, she was sold to a Portland, Maine group for fishing and yachting excursions. The pilot boat America, No. 1, was launched on April 19, 1897, to replace the Florence.

== Construction and service ==
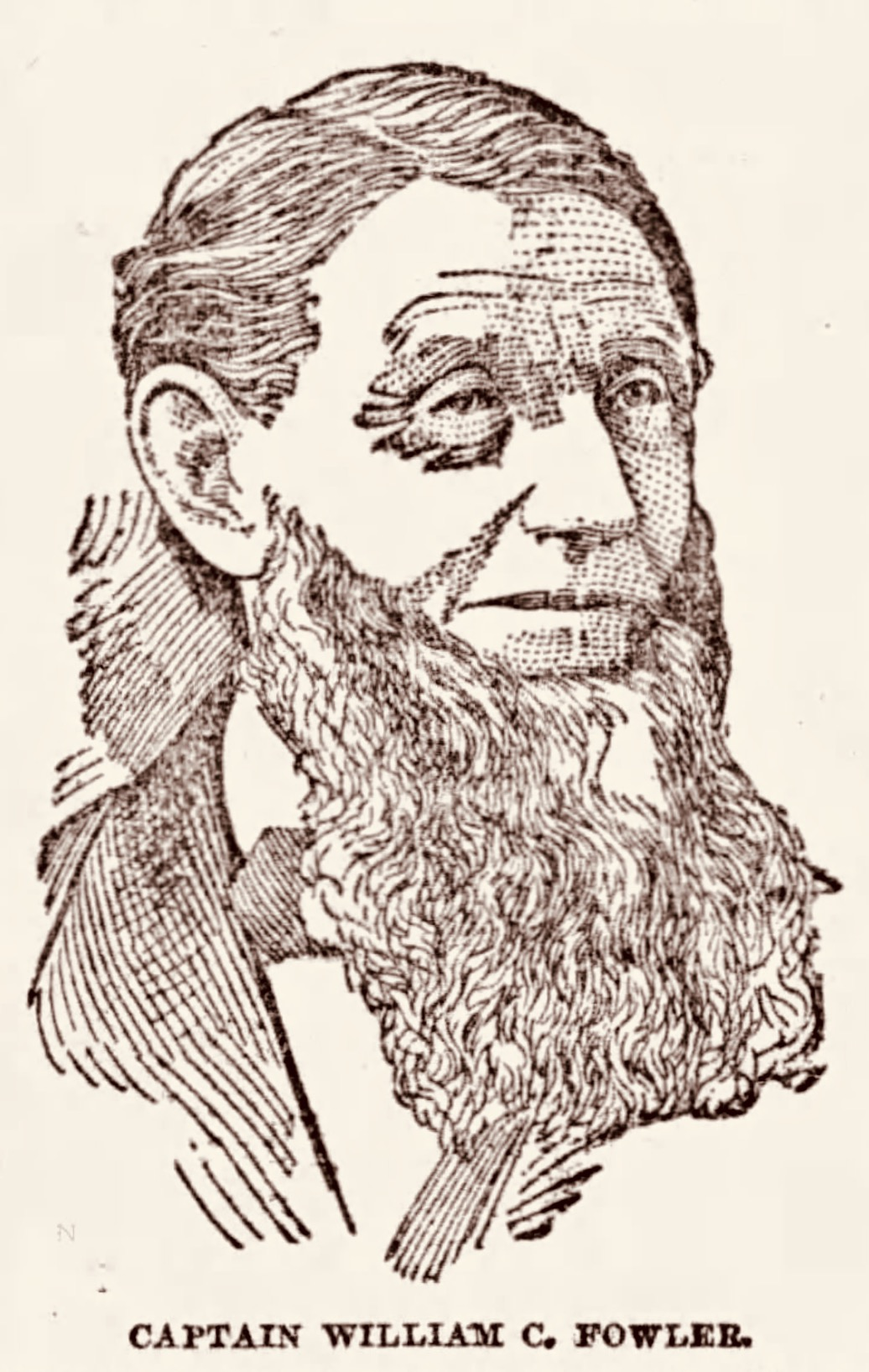
Captain William C. Fowler, a Boston pilot of the pilot-boat Florence.

Florence was built in Boston, Massachusetts in 1867 for William C. Fowler, who supervised her construction. She was built from a model by the noted Boston builder and designer, Dennison J. Lawlor, at the Lawlor shipyard of East Boston. She had a shallow-draft, whose keel is not far below the waterline. The sister pilot boats, Pet and Phantom, were built on this model by Dennison J. Lawlor, in 1868-1869 for the New York pilots.

Florence was registered with the Record of American and Foreign Shipping, from 1881 to 1898, to William C. Fowler as the Captain and E. Bruce as the owner. Her hailing port was Boston. Records indicate that she was 68.6 feet long and weighed 50-tons.

=== Florence No. 6 ===
From 1879 to 1889, the Boston pilot-boat Florence, had the number 6 painted on her mainsail. On May 2, 1879, a Boston pilot on board the Florence, No. 6 went to court against the steamship USS Asa H Joolun, vs. Alfrea A. Nickerson. The master on the steamship refused to accept his services.

On August 4, 1882, the pilot-boat Florence, No. 6, was on a cruise with Captain Fowler and several other pilots. They left Lewis Wharf, with a view of the Boston harbor. Her cabin had ground glass in the doors bearing the name, Florence.

The pilot-boat Florence, No. 6 was taken out of commission for the winter, on December 21, 1889, and was berthed at Cape Ann northeastern Massachusetts.

=== Florence, No. 1 ===
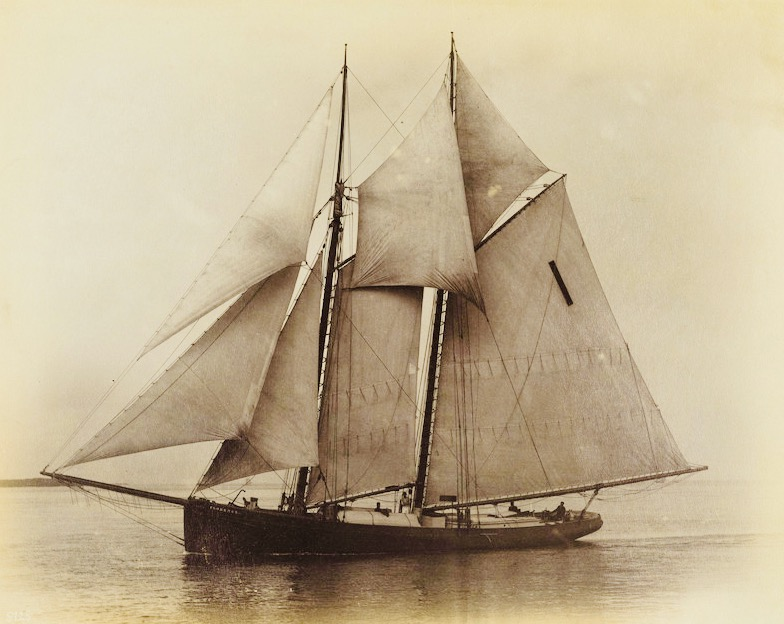
Pilot Boat Florence No 1, c. 1895.

By 1893, the number on her mainsail change to No. 1. On 1893, Captain James H. Reid, on the Piot-boat Florence No. 1, picked up wreckage from a vessel named Plymouth, off Highland Light on the Cape Cod National Seashore in North Truro, Massachusetts. The debris included a trunk containing a vest, other apparel, and cabin fittings.

On April 5, 1896, during a storm, the uninsured pilot-boat Florence No. 1, was driven ashore on the Sandy Cove beach, at Little Brewster Island in the Boston Harbor Islands. Pilot James Reid Jr., son of Captain James H. Reid, the commander and owner of the Florence, was the only pilot aboard. The rest of the crew were safe and returned to the boat to save her.

== End of service ==
In June 1897, Captain James H. Reid's pilot-boat Florence, No. 1 was at the National dock in East Boston when it was sold to Portland, Maine parties, who used her on fishing and yachting excursions. Reid launched the new America, No. 1, on April 19, 1897, from the John Bishop shipyard.

== See also ==
- List of Northeastern U. S. Pilot Boats
