= Hesper (pilot boat) =

Boston Pilot boat

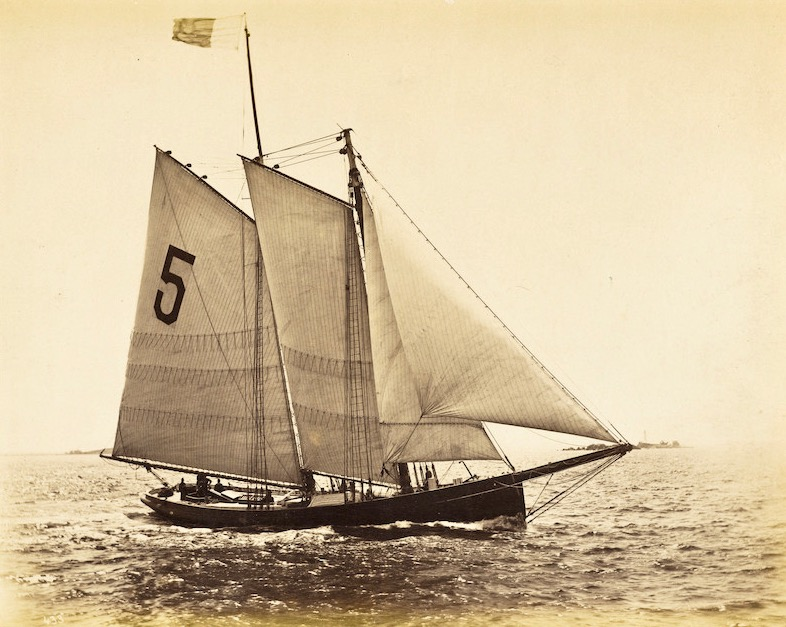
- Pilot Boat Hesper, photograph by Nathaniel Stebbins.

History

United States
- Name: Hesper
- Owner: George W. Lawler, Augustus Hooper, and James L. Smith
- Operator: John Henry Low, George W. Lawler, James L. Smith, J. A. G. McField, Augustus Hooper, R. L. Stubbs, and R. Y. Woodbury.
- Builder: Montgomery & Howard shipyard
- Launched: October 4, 1884
- Out of service: May 13, 1901
- Fate: Sold

General characteristics
- Class & type: schooner
- Tonnage: 94-tons TM
- Length: 104 ft 0 in (31.70 m)
- Beam: 22 ft 0 in (6.71 m)
- Draft: 91 ft 0 in (27.74 m)
- Depth: 12 ft 0 in (3.66 m)
- Propulsion: Sail
- Notes: Frame white oak and planked with hard pine.

The Hesper was a 19th-century Boston pilot boat built in 1884, designed from a model by Dennison J. Lawlor as a Boston yacht and pilot-boat for merchant and ship owner George W. Lawler. She was known to be the largest pilot boat under the American flag at 104 feet long and the fastest of the Boston fleet. She competed in several first-class sailing races, and in 1886, the Hesper won the silver cup in what was known as the first Fishermen's Race. She was withdrawn from the pilot service and sold in 1901. The Hesper became a wreck on the point off Cape Henlopen in 1919.

== Construction and service ==
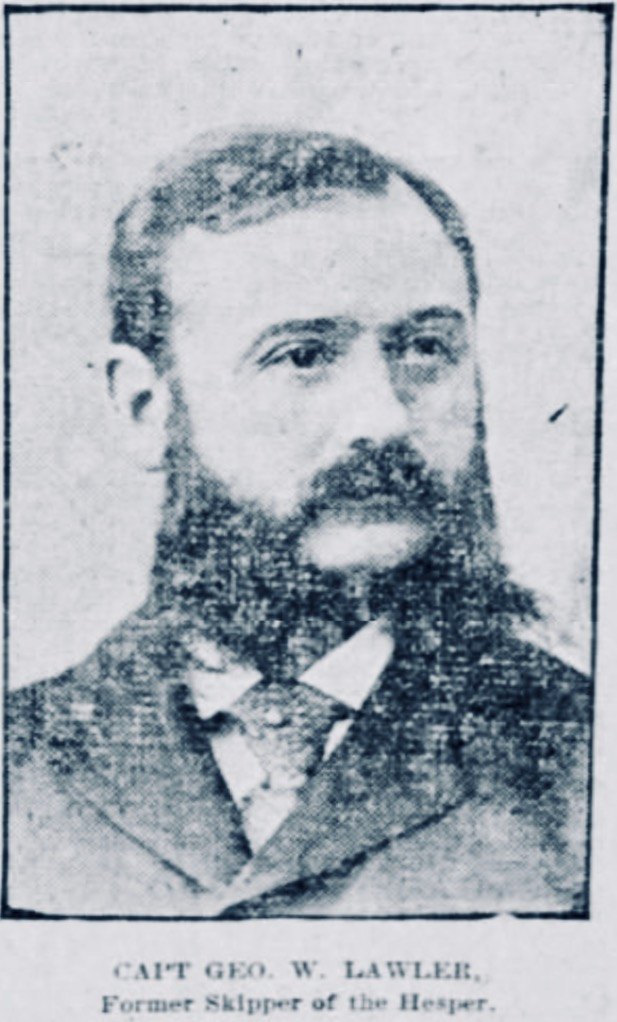
Captain George W. Lawler.

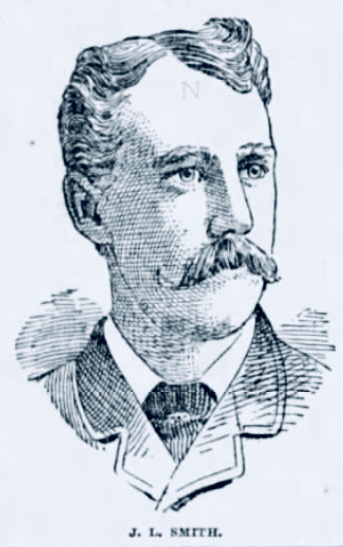
Pilot James L. Smith.

The pilot-boat Hesper, No. 5, was launched on October 4, 1884, from the Montgomery & Howard shipyard in North Chelsea, Massachusetts. She was designed from a model by Dennison J. Lawlor. The pilots assigned to the Hesper were: Captains George W. Lawler, James L. Smith, J. A. G. McField, Augustus Hooper, R. L. Stubbs, and R. Y. Woodbury.

She was the largest pilot-boat under the American flag at 104 feet long. She was the talk of the Boston waterfront because she was the fastest of the Boston fleet. The owners of the Hesper were: Captains George W. Lawler, Augustus Hooper, and Lewis Smith. The Hesper was a departure from earlier Lawlor designas as she was longer, deeper and more narrow than other Boston pilot boats.

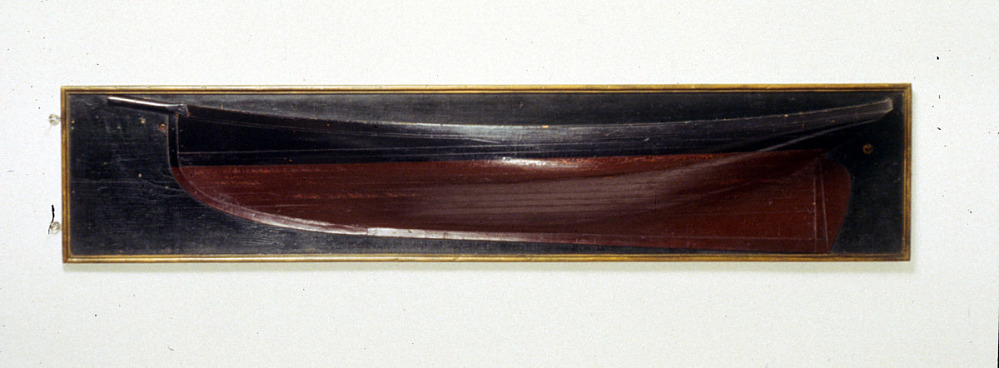
Half Model of the Pilot Schooner Hesper.

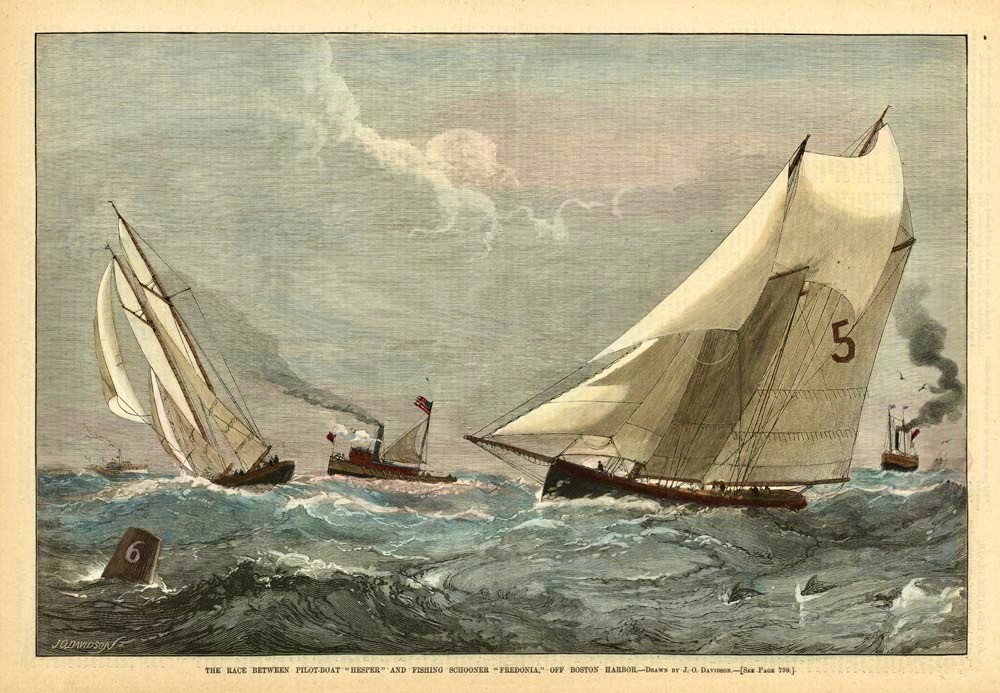
The race between pilot-boat Hesper and fishing schooner Fredonia off Boston Harbor.

The wooden half-model of the Hesper (TR.076037) was a gift by D. J. Lawlor to the "United States National Museum" now the Smithsonian Institution.

In September, 1885, in the fifth America's Cup, Captain Lawler sailed the Hesper, flying a balloon-jib topsail, to New York with some friends aboard, to watch the race between the Puritan and the British challenger, Genesta. John Malcolm Forbes built and skippered the Puritan. Irish-born sailmaker John H. McManus of McManus & Son, of Boston made the sails for the Puritan, made of Plymouth duck. The Puritan beat the Genesta and won the silver cup.

As a yacht, the Hesper competed in several first-class sailing races. In May 1886, the Hesper won the silver cup between the Boston Hesper and the fishing schooner John H. McManus. The contest was sponsored by John Malcolm Forbes and Thomas F. McManus. Forbes added the silver cup if the Hesper was added to the racing group. The race was from Boston to Gloucester, rounding the buoy off Eastern Point Light. Eleven fishing schooners took part in the first Fishermen's Race. McManus became known as the father of Fishermen's races.

On September 26, 1889, there was a race between the pilot-boat Hesper against the fishing schooner Fredonia, which was owned by John Malcolm Forbes. The race was for $6,000. The Fredonia, won. The race results were Fredonia 10:31:13 and the Hesper 10:32:08.

On September 26, 1888, the Massachusetts Humane Society awarded a silver medal to Captain William M. McMellen of the pilot-boat Hesper and bronze medals to Franklin "Frank" Fowler and George W. Lawler of the crew. The three men rescued four of the crew from the Barque Hattie L. Curtis. The Curtis sank in heavy weather and the crew had taken safety on a raft before being picked up by the Hesper. Captain Franklin Fowler was the son of Captain James L. Fowler.

In 1900, Boston had seven pilots boats in commission. The Hesper was Boston's pilot schooner number five. The other Boston boats included, the America, No. 1; Liberty, No. 3; Adams, No. 4; Varuna, No. 6; Minerva, No. 7; and Sylph, No 8.

== End of service ==
In 1901, when the Boston pilots reorganized down to five boats, the pilot-boat Hesper was withdrawn from the pilot service. On May 13, 1901, the Hesper, was sold to Andrew C. Wheelwright, a retired merchant of Rowes Wharf, in Boston, Massachusetts.

On May 5, 1919, the Hesper was struck on the point of Cape Henlopen of the Delaware Bay and became a total wreck. Captain McLean was commander of the vessel.

== See also ==
- List of Northeastern U. S. Pilot Boats
