= Dennison J. Lawlor =

Canadian-Irish shipbuilder (1824–1892)

- Born: January 1, 1824; Saint John, New Brunswick, Canada
- Died: January 1, 1892 (aged 68); Chelsea, Massachusetts, US
- Occupation: shipbuilder
- Spouse: Caroline F. Littlefield
- Children: 4

Dennison J. Lawlor, (January 1, 1824 – January 1, 1892) was a Canadian-Irish shipbuilder and yacht designer. He apprenticed under shipbuilder Whitmore & Holbrook. Lawlor had his own shipyard, building and designing for 40 years some of the finest yachts, pilot boats and 150 merchant vessels built from his designs. The most notable were the Hesper, Florence and D. J. Lawlor. Lawlor died in Chelsea, Massachusetts in 1892.

== Early life ==
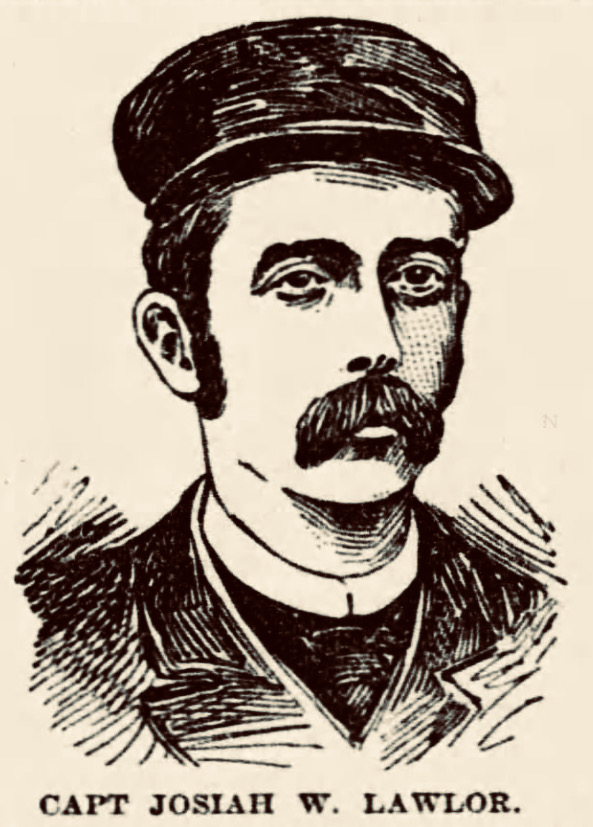
Captain Josiah W. Lawlor.

Dennison J. Lawlor was born on January 1, 1824, in New Brunswick, Canada, to James Lawlor and an Irish mother. He came to Boston when he was fifteen years old. Lawlor married Caroline F. Littlefield on February 18, 1847, in Cambridge, Massachusetts. They had four children, one being, Captain Josiah Warren Lawlor, who was born on November 8, 1854, in Chelsea.

In June 1891, Josiah Lawlor sailed from Crescent Beach, Massachusetts to Land's End on a small 15-foot boat, the Sea Serpent, which was designed by his father. He was lost at sea in 1892 trying to cross the Atlantic on a 12-foot boat.

== Career ==
Lawlor started his career serving his apprenticeship with Whitmore & Holbrook shipbuilders. He established the Dennis J. Lawler shipyard in East Boston at the corner of Condor and Meridian Streets. He was a shipbuilder and yacht designer for over 40 years. Over 150 merchant vessels were built from his designs. The most notable were the Hesper, Florence, and the D. J. Lawlor. Lawlor's pilot boats from 1865 had sharp hollow bows and round sterns.

He became friends and mentor to ship designer Thomas F. McManus and the McManus family, which continued through his lifetime. McManus used Lawlor's genius to design their new schooners.

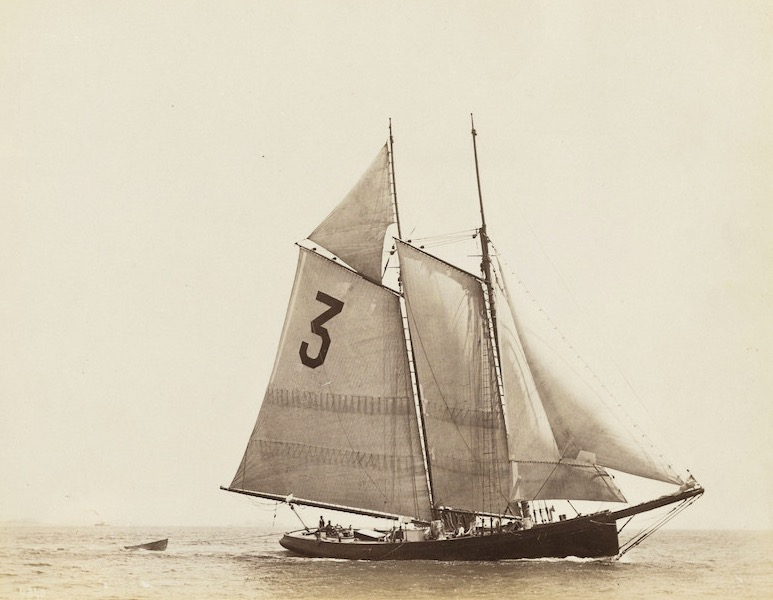
Pilot boat D. J. Lawlor

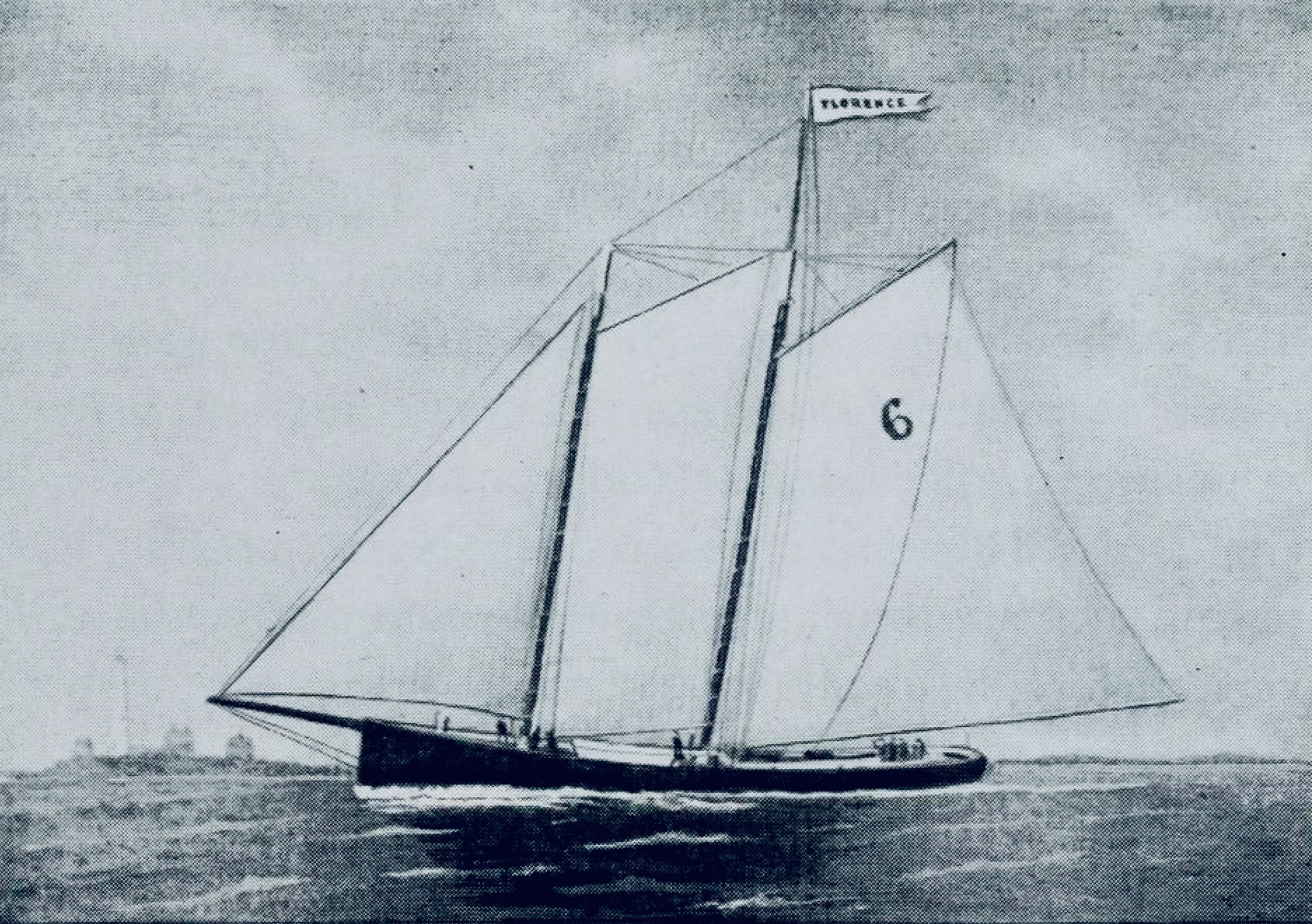
Pilot boat Florence

During 1884–85, Lawlor's Chelsea shipyard shut down due to foreclosure.

== Death and legacy ==
Lawlor died of cancer on January 1, 1892, aged 68, at Chelsea, Massachusetts. He was buried at Mount Auburn Cemetery. Ship designer Tom McManus was one of the mourners at the funeral.

Lawlor will be remembered as a designer of some of the most well built pilot boats and fishing vessels ever seen in the New England waters. He was one of the greatest competitor of George Steers in schooner design.

== See also ==
- List of Northeastern U. S. Pilot Boats
- List of sailboat designers and manufacturers
