= L. A. Dunton (schooner) =

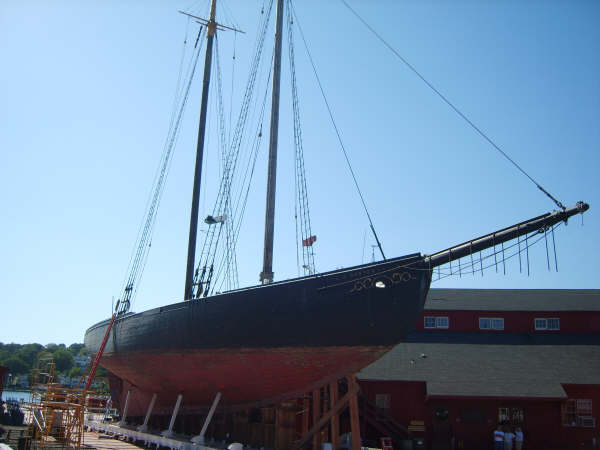
- L. A. Dunton in dry dock

History

United States
- Owner: Mystic Seaport Museum
- Builder: A.D. Story Shipyard
- Launched: 1921
- Status: Museum ship

General characteristics
- Tonnage: 134 gross register tons (GRT); 94 net register tons (NRT)
- Length: 123.0 ft (37.5 m)
- Beam: 24.9 ft (7.6 m)
- Draft: 11.6 ft (3.5 m)
- Sail plan: Schooner
- L. A. Dunton (Schooner)
- U.S. National Register of Historic Places
- U.S. National Historic Landmark
- U.S. Historic district – Contributing property
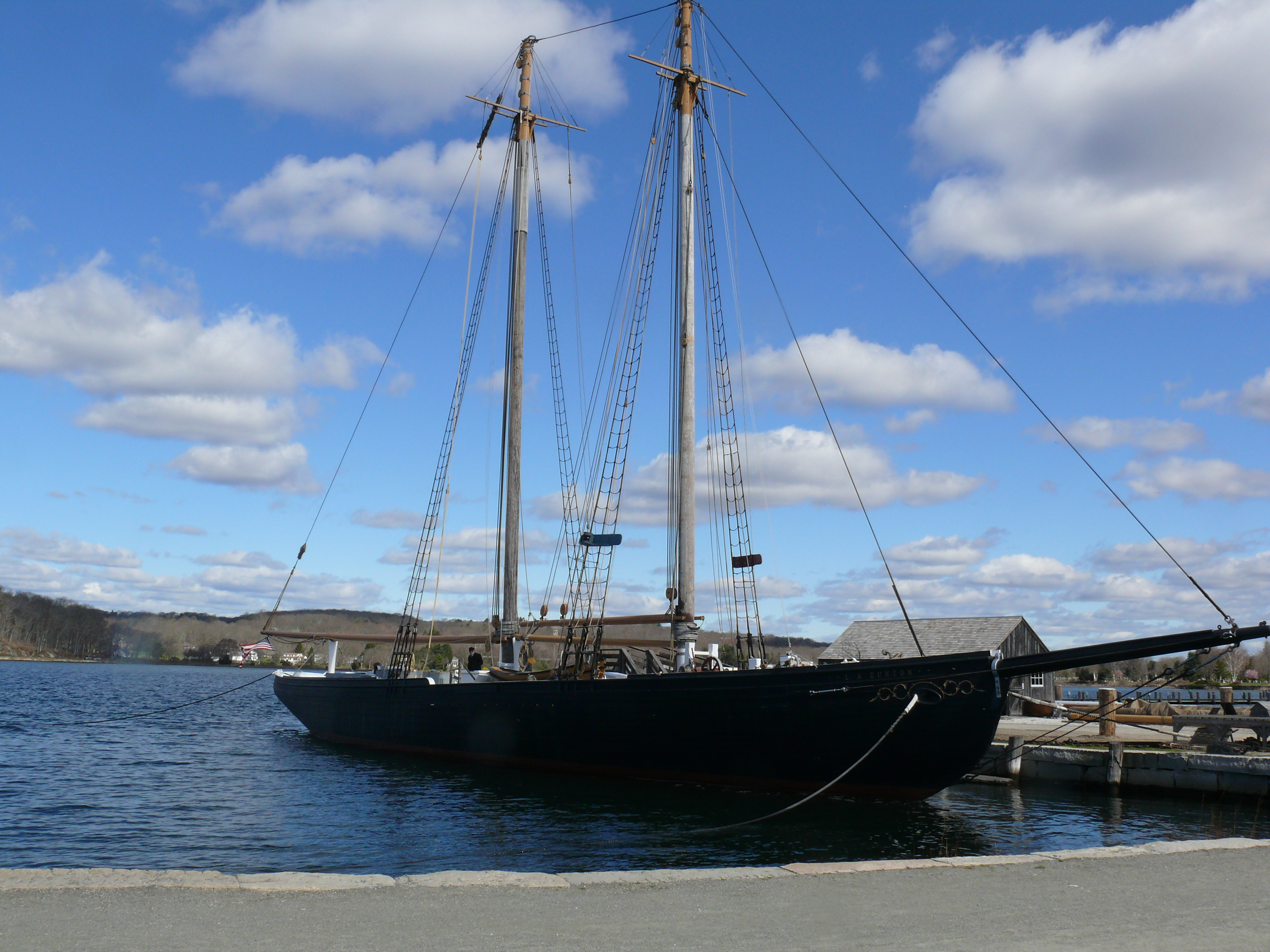
- L.A. Dunton in Mystic Seaport

- Location within Connecticut
- Location: Mystic, Connecticut
- Coordinates: 41°21′30″N 71°57′58″W
- Built: 1921
- Architect: Thomas F. McManus
- Architectural style: Two-masted schooner
- Part of: Mystic Bridge Historic District (ID79002671)
- NRHP reference No.: 93001612

Significant dates
- Added to NRHP: November 4, 1993
- Designated NHL: November 4, 1993
- Designated CP: August 31, 1979

L. A. Dunton is a National Historic Landmark fishing schooner and museum exhibit located at the Mystic Seaport Museum in Mystic, Connecticut. Built in 1921, she is one of three remaining vessels afloat of this type, which was once the most common sail-powered fishing vessel sailing from New England ports. In service in New England waters until the 1930s and Newfoundland into the 1950s. After a brief period as a cargo ship, she was acquired by the museum and restored to her original condition.

== History ==
L. A. Dunton was modeled after a ship (the now shipwrecked Joffre) designed by Thomas F. McManus, one of the most influential naval architects of fishing vessels of the early 20th century. She was built at the A.D. Story Shipyard in Essex, Massachusetts, and launched in 1921. She is one two surviving vessels built at that shipyard, and was among the last large, purely sail-powered fishing vessels built. She was named for Louis A. Dunton, a sailmaker who was one of the investors in the syndicate that commissioned her construction. Even though gasoline engines for auxiliary power were by then a common addition to such vessels, Dunton was not initially outfitted with one.

Dunton's service life in the New England fisheries was about ten years. She was sold in 1934 to Aaron Buffett of Grand Bank, Newfoundland, and served in the Newfoundland cod fishery of the Grand Banks into the 1950s. Buffett removed her rigging and installed a wheelhouse, effectively converting the ship into a ketch with two small sails. In 1955 she was sold out of the fishing fleet, and was converted for use as a coasting cargo ship. Changes to support this use resulted in the removal of most of her interior joinery. She was acquired by the Mystic Seaport Museum in 1963. An initial restoration in 1963-65 returned the rig and stern to their original configuration, while subsequent restorations between 1974 and 1985 returned her to a more fully authentic appearance.

Dunton was declared a National Historic Landmark and listed on the National Register of Historic Places in 1993.

== Description ==
Dunton is a two-masted wooden-hulled schooner, with a rounded bow and bowsprit. She has two topmasts with a height of 112 feet 8 inches (34.34 m). Her body is 104 feet 3 inches (31.78 m) long, with a total vessel length of about 121 feet (37 m). Her beam is 25 feet (7.6 m) and her draft is 11 feet 6 inches (3.51 m). She displaces 188 long tons, with a registered tonnages of 134 gross and 94 net tons. The woods used in her construction include white pine, yellow pine, white oak, and maple, with interior joinery of sycamore and white pine. Her standard rigging included a mainsail, foresail, gaff topsails, fisherman staysail, forestaysail, jib, and jib topsail. She was built with space for a gasoline motor and shaft, one was not installed until 1923.

Below decks, there are crew spaces for fifteen in the forecastle, and the main fish hold was amidships. The captain's cabin was located aft, and had space for five crew; it was a not uncommon practice in the egalitarian New England fishing crews for a captain to bunk and dine with his men.

Dunton is located at a berth on the Mystic River near the Mystic Seaport visitors center. Docked just to her north is the steamer Sabino, also a National Historic Landmark. She is no longer fully rigged, owing to her significantly deteriorated condition, but is still operated as a museum exhibit. Mystic Seaport Museum is planning a major renovation beginning in 2022.

== See also ==
- List of National Historic Landmarks in Connecticut
- National Register of Historic Places listings in New London County, Connecticut
- List of museum ships
- List of schooners
