= Thomas F. McManus =

American yacht designer

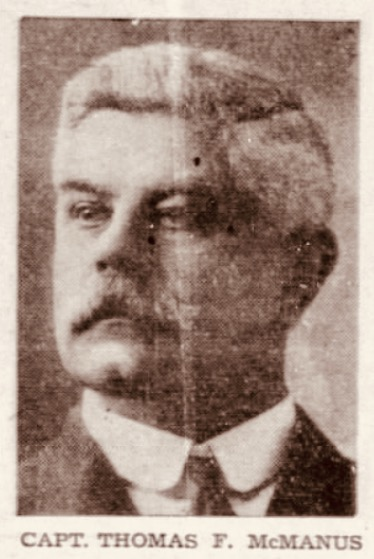
- Capt. Thomas F. McManus, c. 1904
- Born: September 11, 1856; Boston, Massachusetts
- Died: November 14, 1938 (aged 82); Milton, Massachusetts, US
- Occupations: Designer, fish merchant
- Spouse: Catharine Agnes Cokeley
- Children: 12

Thomas Francis McManus (September 11, 1856 – November 14, 1938) was a fish merchant who became a naval architect, who introduced a shortened bowsprit and long stern overhang to make his vessels faster. He was well known for revolutionizing the Gloucester fishing schooner. He made the fastest vessels of their type in the world. He became known as the "Father of the Fishermen's Races." 500 fishing schooners used his designs to improve speed. He was a friend of Sir Thomas Lipton and US President Theodore Roosevelt.

== Family ==
McManus was born in the North End of Boston, Massachusetts, US on September 11, 1856, one of five children of John H. McManus, (1822-1893), an Irish-born sailmaker from Fingal, and Margaret "Meg" Harriet Sweetman (1829-1884). The couple were married on May 26, 1853, in Boston. John McManus' parents, Charles McManus and Ann Herbert, brought the family to America during the 1846 sailing season.

=== John H. McManus ===
John H. McManus owned McManus & Son, which was chosen by Edward Burgess to furnish the sails for the 19th-century racing yacht Puritan, the 1885 America's Cup defender. Burgess chose McManus again when the Mayflower was built and won the sixth America's Cup in 1886 against Scottish challenger Galatea. Other yachts that wore the sails cut by McManus were the America, Halcyon, and Sachem. He built the Joseph Henry (1860), Sylph (1865), Actress (1871), Sarah H. Prior (1882), John H. McManus (1885), and the A. S. and R. Hammond (1884).

John McManus died on October 11, 1893, in Charlestown, Boston of pneumonia. His funeral was at St. Mary's church in Charlestown and burial at the Calvary Cemetery.

=== Youth ===
Thomas McManus spent much of his youth at the waterfront in boats and visits with the merchants at the Boston wharfs. He studied ship construction under Dennison J. Lawlor, who was friends with the McManus family for half a century. Formal education was at the English High School and at Comer's Commercial College in Boston, a business and stenography school. After college he took a job as a clerk in a fish store on Atlantic Avenue.

McManus married Catharine Agnes Cokeley of Charlestown, Boston on September 10, 1878. They had 12 children.

== Career ==
McManus was a fish merchant who had a great interest in boat racing and boat design. In 1876, he opened a wholesale and retail fish market at No. 13 Commercial Wharf with Charley Lampee. The name changed to McManus & Co. when Lampee left the business in 1879.

He revolutionized the Gloucester fishing schooner and made it the fastest vessel of its type in the world. He was honored on two continents for his skill as a naval architect. McManus helped design 500 fishing schooners. Among the most notable McManus-designed boats, are the Imperator; Kernwood, renamed Trenton (1907); the Rose Dorothea, which won the Lipton Cup in 1907 with its "Indian Head" design; the Henry Ford, winner of the Lipton Cup at Gloucester in 1924; the Experanto, winner of the Halifax Herald Cup; the Oriole; the Regina, well known for her speed; the Elizabeth Howard, called the White Ghost; and Little Dan, named for a celebrated halibut fisherman.

The L. A. Dunton, built in 1921, was modeled after the ship Joffre designed by McManus. The Dunton is now a National Historic Landmark fishing schooner and exhibit located at the Mystic Seaport Museum in Mystic, Connecticut.

=== Technique ===
McManus introduced a design innovation where he shortened the bowsprit and increased the stern overhang to give speed to his vessels. Nearly every fishing schooner today uses the McManus lines. Two of his models, the James S. Steele and the Helen B. Thomas are at the Smithsonian Institution. He later took away the bowsprit, which helped in speed and safety.

=== Fishermen's races ===
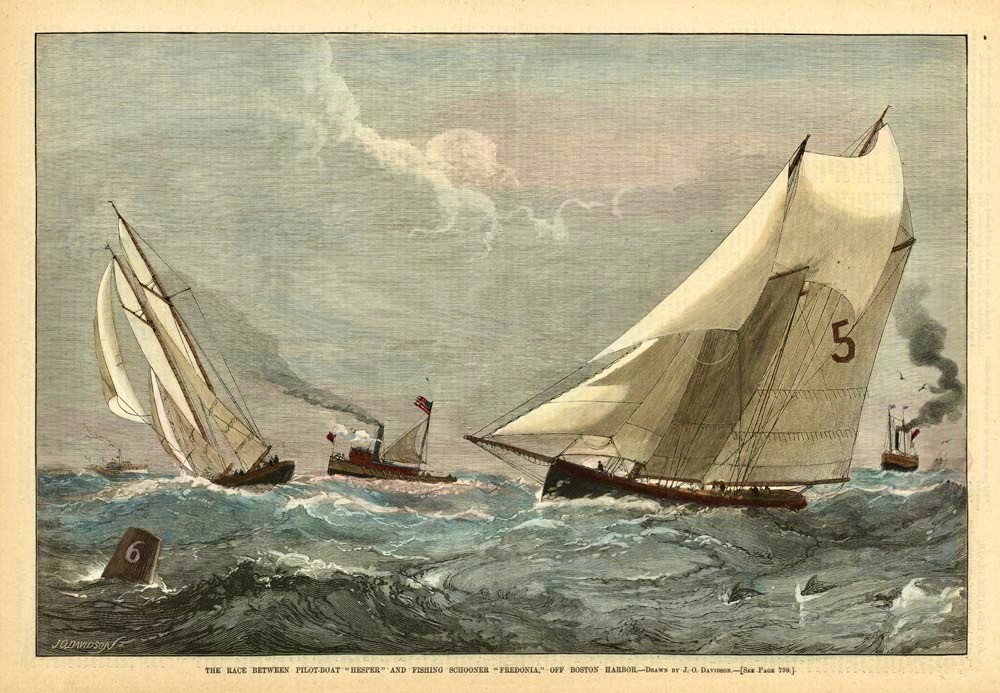
The race between pilot-boat Hesper and fishing schooner Fredonia off Boston Harbor.

In May 1886, McManus and John Malcolm Forbes sponsored a race between the pilot-boat Hesper and the fishing schooner John H. McManus. The race was from Boston to Gloucester, rounding the buoy off Eastern Point Light. Eleven fishing schooners took part in the Fishermen's Race. The race was well advertised. Hesper won the silver cup and the John H. McManus won the $100 purse.

The fishing schooner John H. McManus was built in Essex County, Massachusetts by Arthur D. Story in 1885. The design combined Lawlor's hull-modeling experience with McManus' innovative ideas in her plumb-stem, deep-draft hull and improved rig. The 106-ton schooner was launched on May 18, 1885. Charles A. McManus, the schooner's underwriter and owner, named her for his three-year son, John H. Jr., John H. Sr.'s namesake grandson. On March 5, 1889, the McManus was lost in a storm on the outer bar near Wellfleet, Massachusetts.

McManus designed the Boston pilot-boat America No. 1, built for Captain James H. Reid of Boston on April 19, 1897. The America did not resemble her famous namesake, rather she was designed with a fishing schooner Indian head bowsprit. On July 8, 1897, the pilot-boat America was in the Fisherman's Race against the fishing schooner James S. Steele, both designed by McManus. The race went along Long Island head. The pilot-boat America beat the fisherman James S. Steele by three minutes.

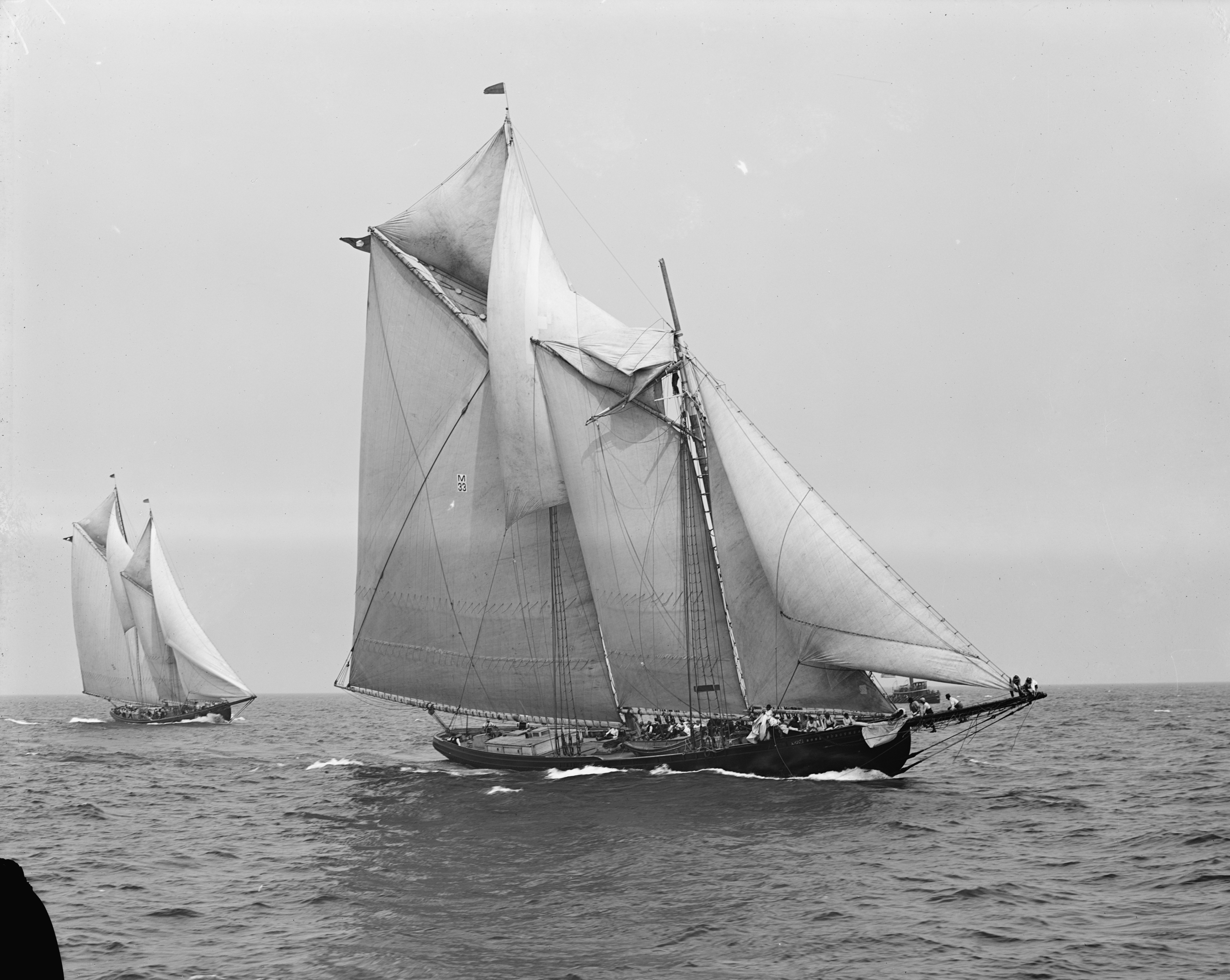
The gaff-rigged schooner Rose Dorothea won the 1907 Lipton's Cup

On August 1, 1907, the Lipton Challenge Cup Fishermen's Race was between McManus's Gaff rig Rose Dorthea, the Jessie Costa, and three other boats. The Dorothea won the Lipton Cup, given by Sir Thomas Lipton for the winner of the race. The victory brought Provincetown, Massachusetts to the forefront of the fishermen's races. Because of the fisherman races, McManus became known as the "Father of Fishermen's Races." Later in August 1907, after Theodore Roosevelt's speech in Provincetown to lay the cornerstone of the Pilgrim Monument, the president spoke to McManus about the recent fishermen's race. McManus and Roosevelt met again and talked about McManus's large family and an invitation to the White House.

== Death ==
McManus died in Milton, Massachusetts, on November 14, 1938, at the age of 82. His funeral was at St. Mary's of the Hills Church in Milton. He was buried at the Calvary cemetery.
