= James H. Reid =

Boston Pilot

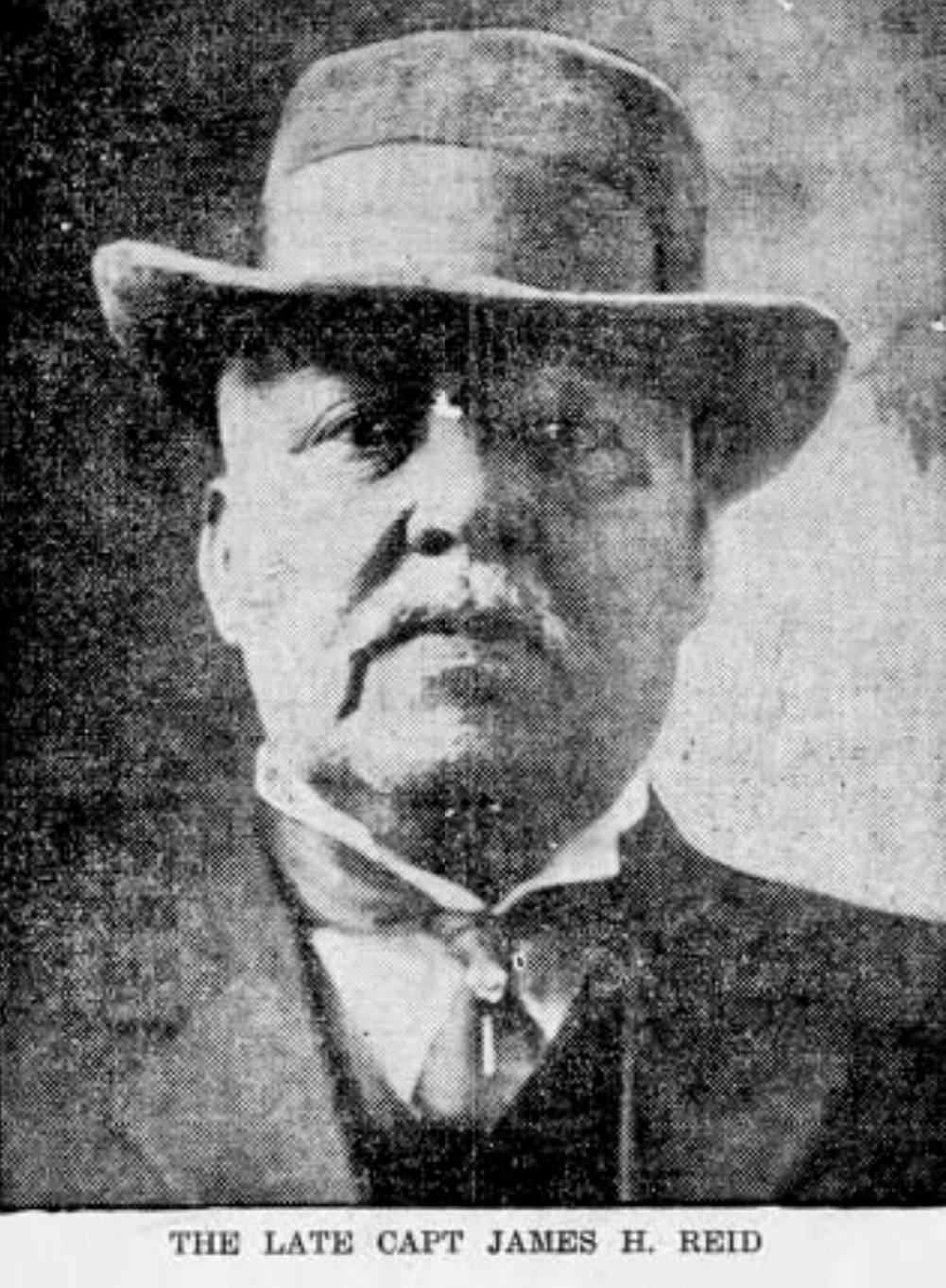
- James H. Reid, c. 1914.
- Born: 1842; Barre, Massachusetts, US
- Died: 7 March 1919 (aged 76–77); Medford, Massachusetts, US
- Occupation: harbor pilot
- Spouse: Estella
- Children: 2

James H. Reid, (1842 – March 7, 1919) was a 19th-century American Maritime pilot. He is best known for being the dean of the Boston pilots, serving for 55 years. He was captain of the famous yacht America for 17 years when she was owned by Benjamin F. Butler. In 1897, he built a new America, named after the America's Cup defender.

== Early life ==
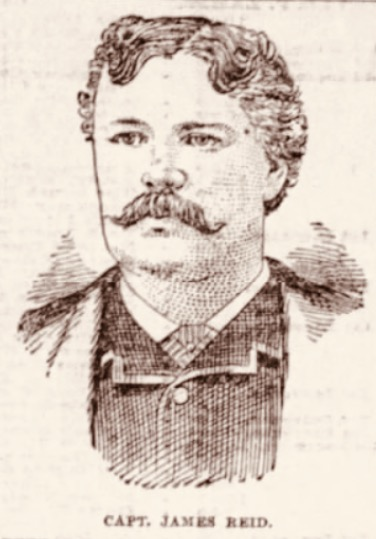
Captain James Reid, ca. 1889.

Reid was born on a farm in Barre, Massachusetts in 1842. He moved to Boston in 1855 and went to sea as a sailor.

Reid was married and had two sons, James H. Reid Jr. and Cyril Ward Reid, both pilots.

== Career ==
In 1859, he became an apprentice boatkeeper for the pilot-boat Phantom, No. 11 receiving a wage of $8.00 a month. In 1862, when he was only 20, he became boatkeeper on the schooner Syren in the Boston Harbor to learn the pilot business.

During the American Civil War, Reid was on the schooner Coquette, when he sighted smoke from vessels being burned by the Confederate cruiser Florida. To avoid being captured, he head in the opposite direction until he got to Marblehead, Massachusetts. In 1862, Reid was an employee of an independent news association competing with the Associated Press. His assignment was to board incoming boats and gather the news and bring it back to the newspaper. In March, 1864 Reid went out to meet the Bat, a Union blockade runner, which had been captured off Charleston, South Carolina, and brought back to Boston. A naval officer asked him, for twenty-five dollars, to bring back a Confederate spy, Belle Boyd, a celebrity among woman in the South, who was attempting to travel to England. Reid escaped prosecution by saying that he thought the lady was an officer's wife.

In 1873, Reid received his commission as a branch pilot. When the D. J. Lawlor was built in 1882, Reid bought one-third of her along with Abel F. Hayden and William V. Abbott.

=== Yacht America ===
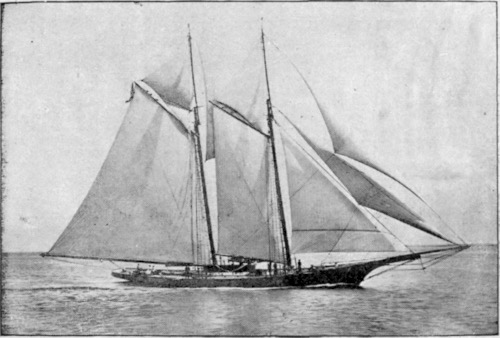
Yacht America, c. 1874, photographed by Nathaniel Stebbins.

On June 20, 1873, the celebrated yacht America, was purchased from the United States by Benjamin F. Butler and Col. J. H. French. She arrived in Bay View, Gloucester, Massachusetts, and was restored by the East Boston clipper ship builder, Donald McKay. In 1874, Reid commanded the rejuvenated America, when she was owned by Butler. She was registered with the Record of American and Foreign Shipping from 1884 to 1900 to James H. Reid as Captain and J. H. French as owners. The registration lists the America as built in 1849 in Greenpoint, New York, by George Steers and J. H. French as the owner and James H. Reid as master. She was 96 feet long and weighed 90 tons. Her hailing port was Gloucester, Massachusetts.

Reid was in charge of the America for sixteen years and sailed her from Labrador to South America. In 1875, the America was retrofitted and sailed a race with the schooner Resolute, off the Isles of Shoals and won the race. later, she sailed a squadron race and won. In the winter 1881, when she was lengthened 6 1/2 feet, Reid and Butler sailed her on a cruise to the West Indies returning to Boston in 1882. From 1878-1881, Reit and Butler went on cruises to Nova Scotia and to Newfoundland. In 1874, Reid had Nathaniel Stebbins take a picture of the America in motion (see picture on right). According to Stebbins, "the picture was one of the wonders of the times."

=== America No. 1 ===
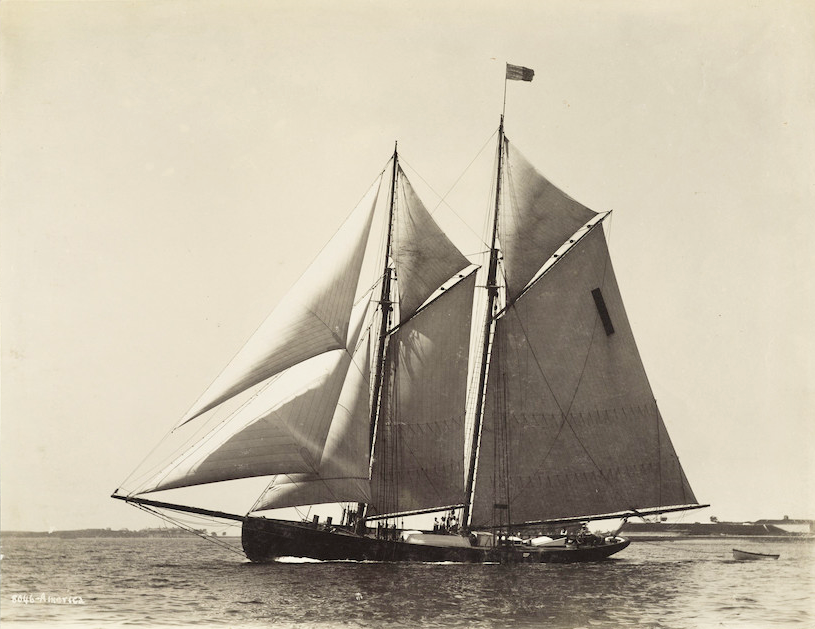
Pilot boat America, No. 1.

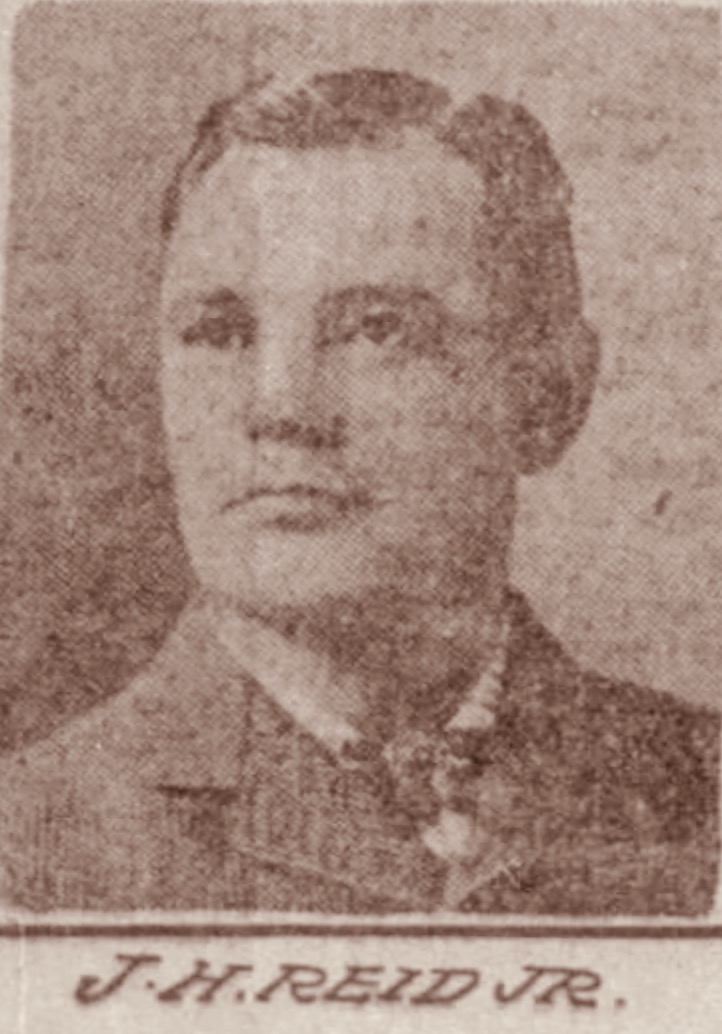
James H. Reid Jr.

On April 19, 1897, the new America, No. 1, was built for Captain Reid and designed from the line drawings by Thomas F. McManus. She was launched from the shipyard of John Bishop of Gloucester, Massachusetts. He named the new America, after the America's Cup defender. His son James H. Reid Jr., and Bruce McLean were assigned to the new boat. In 1898, Reid survived the Portland Gale on the America.

When the Boston pilots reorganized down to five boats in 1901, the pilot-boat America continued in the Boston service. Captain Reid piloted the America, as the last vessel under the old system. The Boston America did not resemble her famous namesake, rather she was designed with a fishing schooner 'Indian head' bow.

== Death ==
Reid died on March 7, 1919, at the age of 79 in Medford, Massachusetts. Funeral services were held in the Masonic Hall, East Boston, conducted by the Temple Lodge of Masons. He was a widow at the time of his death. His burial was at the Garden Cemetery, Chelsea, Massachusetts.

== See also ==
- List of pilot boats and pilots.
