= Varuna (pilot boat) =

Boston Pilot boat

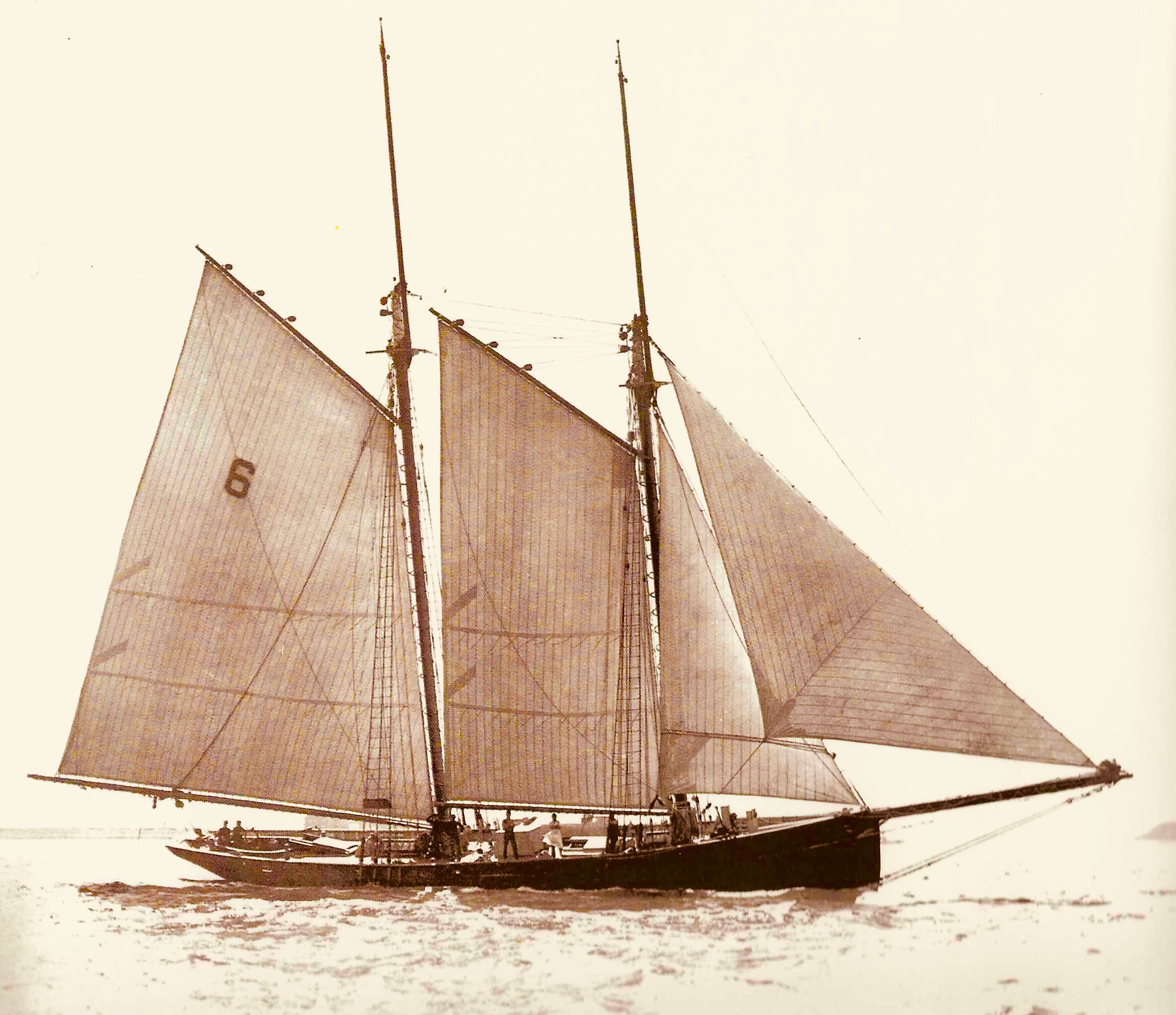
- Boston pilot boat Varuna, No. 6.

History

United States
- Name: Varuna
- Namesake: Varuna the Vedic king
- Owner: Captain Thomas Cooper
- Operator: Thomas Cooper; William McMilan; William H. Fairfield; James L. Smith
- Builder: Montgomery & Howard
- Launched: 8 May 1890
- Out of service: 28 June 1913
- Fate: Sold

General characteristics
- Class & type: schooner
- Tonnage: 90-tons TM
- Length: 87 ft 0 in (26.52 m)
- Beam: 23 ft 0 in (7.01 m)
- Draft: 10 ft 5 in (3.18 m)
- Depth: 9 ft 7 in (2.92 m)
- Propulsion: Sail

The Varuna was a 19th-century Boston pilot boat, built by Montgomery & Howard at Chelsea, Massachusetts in 1890, for a group of Boston pilots. She was designed by yacht designer Edward Burgess, known for his America's Cup defenders. She was the first centerboard pilot-boat in operation in the Massachusetts Bay. The Varuna went out of service in 1912 because of the introduction of steam power into pilot-boats. She was later sold to Stephen Simmons to be used as a trading vessel between ports in the Spanish Main in 1913.

== Construction and service ==
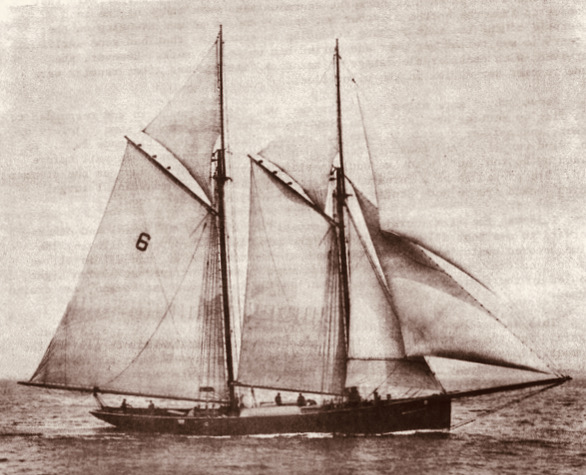
Pilot boat Varuna with all her sails, Photograph by Nathaniel L. Stebbins, c. 1900.

The Boston Pilot Boat Varuna, was a 90-ton schooner, built in 1890 by Howard & Montgomery at Chelsea, Massachusetts. Her design was by the American yacht designer, Edward Burgess, known for his America's Cup defenders, Puritan (1885), Mayflower (1886), and Volunteer (1887). Varuna is the name for Varuna the Vedic king of the waters of early Hindu mythology.

On September 23, 1892, the pilot boat Varuna was struck and sunk by the fishing schooner Emily P. Wright. She was floated by tugboat A. W. Chesterton and towed to the Lewis Wharf.

The new pilot-boat Varuna, was launched on 8 May 1890, at Chelsea, Massachusetts. Her dimensions were 87 feet in length, with 23 feet beam and 10 1/2 feet draught. She was the first centreboard pilot-boat in the Boston fleet. At launch, she was commanded by Captain James H. Reid, who mastered General Benjamin F. Butler's yacht America.

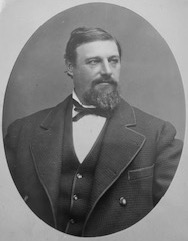
Captain Thomas Cooper.

On 26 November 1898, while returning to Boston, the Varuna, No. 6, met up with the Portland Gale. Captain William McMilan, succeeded in working the Varuna out off Highland Light, when she was driven into shoal water during the storm. He had been captain of the Varuna for four years. McMilan was able to board a Johnston line steamer Sedgemore, inbound from Philadelphia. Varuna's double reefed sails were damaged and her yawls washed away. The steamer was able to tow the pilot-boat from off Highland Light into the Boston harbour. Captain William McMilan, Captain William H. Fairfield and the crew were grateful to Captain Bartlett of the steamer for rescuing them. After repairs were made she resumed her duties in the pilot fleet. Captain Frederick W. Ahlquist, was head boatkeeper on the Varuna and later told of the experience of surviving the storm. During the gale, sister pilot-boat, the Columbia, No. 8, was driven ashore at the Sand Hills beach in Scituate, Massachusetts with the loss of all five men aboard. Captain Thomas Cooper was transferred from the Columbia to the Varuna, as he had ownership in the Varuna.

On June 22, 1899, James L. Smith escorted the USS Massachusetts from the Varuna. He was last attached to the Varuna, before he retired from pilot service due to illness.

In April 1900, Charles I. Lampee, during spring vacation and his senior year in high school, went on a cruise with his grandfather skipper Thomas Cooper. They went from Boston eastward 200 miles when they came across the steamer with a load of coal headed for Boston. The pilot flag was set and Captain Cooper rowed a yawl to the steamer to climb on board. He convinced the captain on the steamer to tow them back to Boston to save time as there was not enough wind to return home.

On 12 November 1900, Captain Clifford McField, of the pilot boat Varuna, No. 6, encountered bad weather 70 miles east of Boston Light. A huge wave came on board, which carried away boat-keeper Sidney Campbell and caused considerable damage to the boat. Pilot Thomas Cooper helped to return the boat to port.

== End of service ==
The Varuna was out of commission in 1912 because of the introduction of steam power into the pilot-boats. The Pilots' Relief Society reduced the Boston fleet five to three boats. On 28 June 1913, the pilot-boat Varuna was sold to Stephen Simmons to be used as a trading vessel between ports in the Spanish Main. The price paid for the pilot-boat was $3,000.

== See also ==
- List of Northeastern U. S. Pilot Boats
