= USS Liberty III =

Patrol vessel of the United States Navy

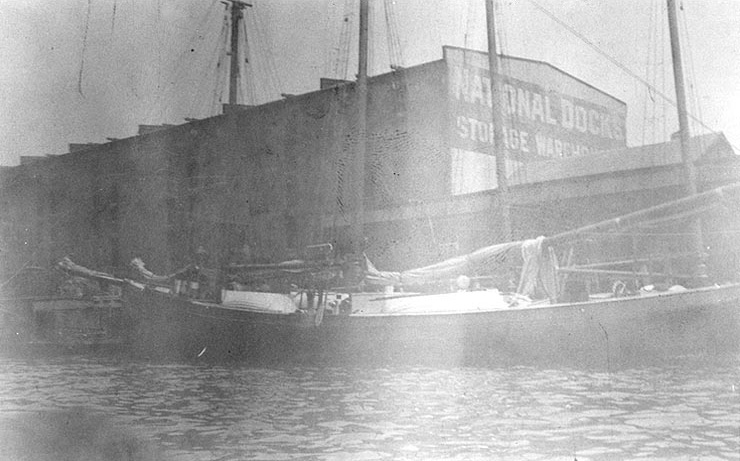
- Liberty III as a civilian schooner-rigged pilot boat, probably around the time of her acquisition by the United States Navy in September 1917

History

United States
- Name: USS Liberty III
- Namesake: Previous name retained
- Owner: Susie Low
- Operator: John Henry Low, Bruce B. McLean, Watson Shields Dolliver
- Builder: John Bishop, Gloucester, Massachusetts
- Cost: $17,000
- Completed: 1896
- Acquired: 10 September 1917
- Commissioned: 20 or 21 September 1917
- Decommissioned: 8 January 1919
- Fate: Returned to owner 8 January 1919
- Notes: Operated as civilian schooner-rigged pilot boat Liberty III 1896-1917 and from 1919

General characteristics
- Type: Patrol vessel
- Tonnage: 96 Gross register tons
- Tons burthen: 90-tons
- Length: 100 ft (30 m) or 103 ft (31 m)
- Beam: 24 ft (7.3 m)
- Draft: 12 ft 5 in (3.78 m)
- Propulsion: Sails plus auxiliary engine
- Sail plan: Schooner-rigged
- Speed: 8.5 knots
- Complement: 10
- Armament: None

USS Liberty III (SP-1229), sometimes written Liberty # 3, and also referred to during her naval career as Liberty and as Pilot Boat Liberty, No. 3, was a United States Navy patrol vessel in commission from 1917 to 1919. The Liberty was a pilot boat from 1896 to 1917. She was a replacement for the pilot boat D. J. Lawlor. After World War I, the Liberty returned to pilot service until 1934 when she was purchased as a yacht.

== Construction and service ==
=== Pilot boat ===
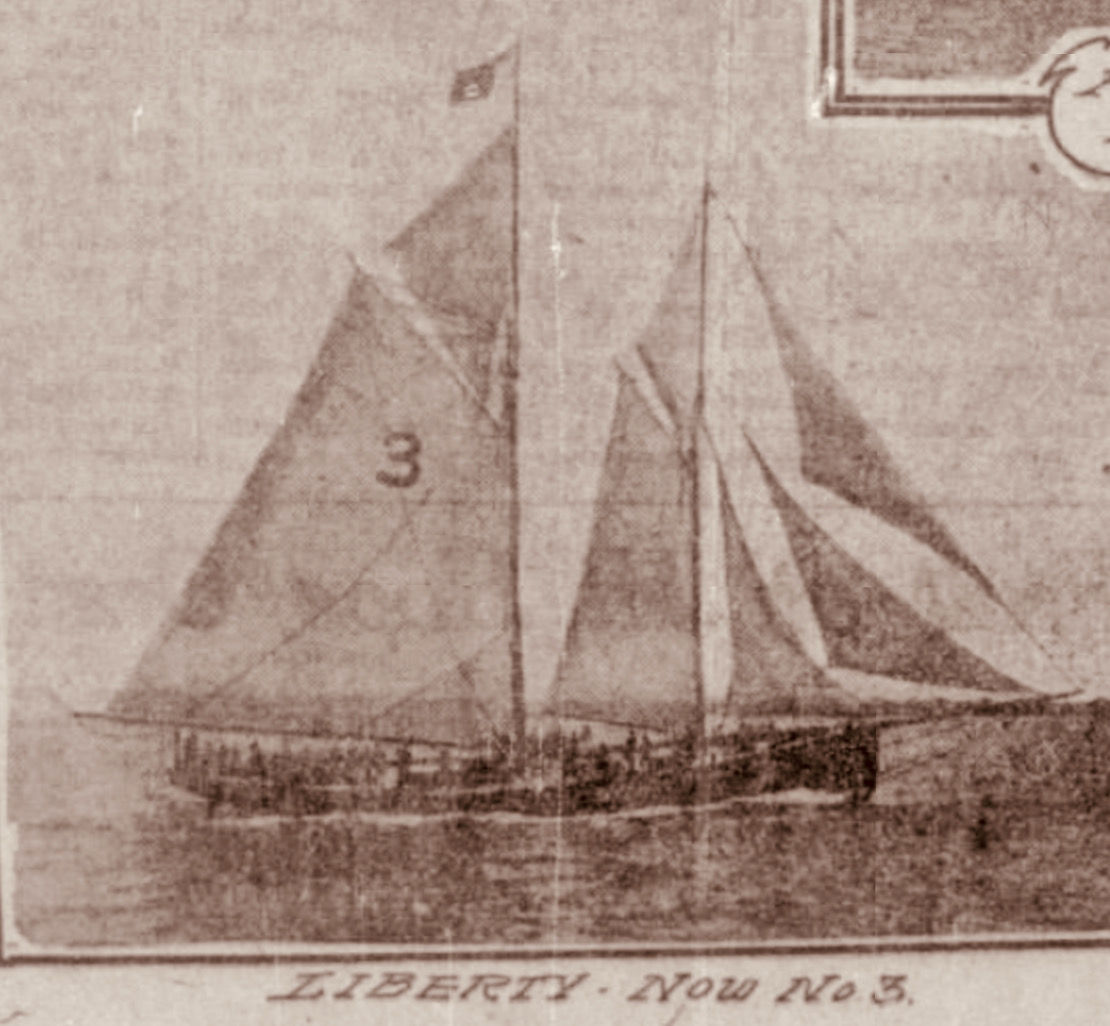
Pilot Boat Liberty, No. 3

The Liberty, No. 3 was built as a civilian schooner-rigged pilot boat in 1896 by John Bishop at his shipyard in Gloucester, Massachusetts. The registered Master was John Henry Low and owner was Susie Low.

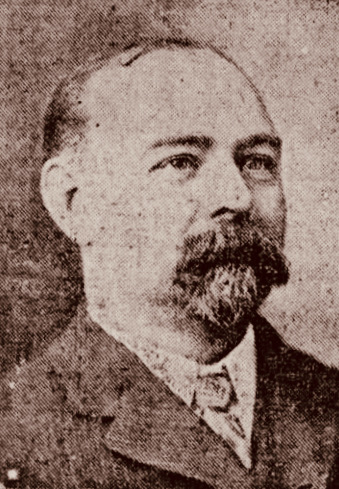
Boston Pilot Captain John H. Low

On March 30, 1896, 1896, the Liberty was launched from the John Bishop shipyard, to take the place of the ill-fated pilot-boat D. J. Lawlor, No. 3. The boat was built for pilots James Murdock, John H. Low, C. K. Nelson and John Ward. She was 104 feet long, 118-tons and cost $17,000. She was built to beat the popular Hesper.

On January 31, 1897, boatkeeper Charles Benthram was left in charge of the Liberty, No. 3 after the last pilot was placed on board the steamship Sachem. He tried to enter the port of Boston in foggy weather, but decided to stay at the Boston Light. The boat drifted 50 miles. After two days at sea the weather finally became calm and he was able to return to Boston. Benthram received his training by his uncle, Captain Thomas Cooper, on the pilot boat Columbia No. 2.

On April 29, 1900, Captain J. H. Low, James M. Murdock, C. K. Nelson, J. C. Fawcett, and E. G. Martin were pilots on the Liberty, No. 3.

On April 10, 1902, Bruce B. McLean, James M. Murdock, John H. Low, C. K. Nelson, F. J. Gevalt, and William McMillian were pallbearers at the funeral for Captain E. G. Martin. They were also and pilots of the Captain Martin's pilot boat Liberty.

On October 8, 1916, Watson Shields Dolliver was on the pilot boat Liberty when he helped The Boston Globe transfer a reporter from the pilot boat to board the American-Hawaiian Steamship Company steamer SS Kansan that was headed for Boston with news about the German U-53 U-boat. The Globe had the story out in the morning papers before anyone else.

On 4 May 1917, a pilot boat model of the Liberty, No. 3 was presented by the pilots of Boston Harbor, some of which were Captains John H. Low, James H. Reid Jr., Joseph Fawcett, Nathaniel W. Abbott.

=== Acquired by US Navy ===
On 10 September 1917 the U.S. Navy acquired her under a free lease from her owner, the Boston Pilots Relief Society, for use as a section patrol boat during World War I. She was enrolled in the Naval Coast Defense Reserve on 15 September 1917 and commissioned on 20 September 1917 as USS Liberty III (SP-1229).

Assigned to the 1st Naval District in northern New England and based at Boston, Massachusetts, Liberty III served for the rest of World War I as a harbor entrance patrol boat, guiding the movements of ships that navigated the defensive sea area of the port of Boston.

The Navy decommissioned Liberty III on 8 January 1919 and returned her to the Boston Pilots Relief Society the same day.

== End of service ==
On 8 September 1934, the Liberty was purchased by Roscoe H. Prior, president of the American Stevedoring Corporation of Boston. The new owner raced her in international cup races.

== See also ==
- List of Northeastern U.S. pilot boats
