= Nathaniel Stebbins =

Nathaniel Livermore Stebbins (January 9, 1847 – July 10, 1922) was an American marine photographer whose surviving photographs document an important era in the development of American maritime activities. Sweeping technological and social changes revolutionized activity on the water, in military, commercial, and leisure spheres.

In addition to selling prints of his images, he also produced a number of books of nautical images in his lifetime, including an important illustrated coastal guide, which was path-breaking in showing the practical uses of photography. His photography (and, occasionally, writing) also appeared in well-known magazines like The Rudder and Yachting.

Over his working career as a commercial photographer (from 1884 to 1922), he took approximately 25,000 images. Of these, about 60% were of marine subjects (the majority of those being leisure activities, but many are of military and commercial scenes, a valuable record for historians). The remainder includes various commercial work, including the theatre, railroads, home interiors, etc.

== Biography ==
He was born in Meadville, Pennsylvania, on January 9, 1847, the son of a well-known Unitarian clergyman, Ruphus Phineas Stebbins, and his wife, Eliza Clark Livermore. He was always interested in the sea, and as a young man, he sailed to South America as a passenger, although his early career was not related to the sea or photography.

On March 6, 1872, he married Etta Bowles. They had three children: Ellen, Charles, and Katharine.

He became interested in photography in about 1882, shortly after the introduction of dry-plate photography, which made photography more practical with its fast exposure time and ease of use. With an interest in the sea and little competition in that area, it was natural that he should specialize in maritime photography.

He moved his family to the Boston, Massachusetts area to engage in this field and joined yacht clubs in Boston and Marblehead. It is not known whether his photography business was his sole income; there are indications that either he or his wife had independent means, but little is known.

He went on to publish several large-format books showcasing his maritime photography. For his innovative Illustrated Coast Pilot, which illustrated principal landmarks and aids to navigation on the East Coast, he studied for and passed the examination for a licensed coastal pilot for a considerable section of the East Coast. This early photographic record may be the first publication to systematically employ photography to illustrate landmarks in a book of sailing directions, a type of navigational aid used by mariners for more than one thousand years. The first edition (1891) of the Illustrated Coast Pilot covered only the U.S. East Coast between New York and Maine. Stebbins extended coverage to the entire Atlantic Coast and the Gulf Coast in the second edition (1896).

It is thought that many of the photographs from his later years were taken by assistants, as he was rather frail by then. He was living in West Somerville, Massachusetts, when he died at the age of 75.

== Surviving works ==
His collection at his death included about 20,000 negatives, almost all on glass plates (the usual medium for high-resolution negatives in his time). Another photographer bought some of Stebbins' plates, and after his death, many of them were sold for scrap (tradition holds that they were used in greenhouses).

A few plates found their way to the Peabody Museum in Salem, Massachusetts, and another small group eventually wound up at the Mariners' Museum, but the bulk of the remaining collection (about 5,000 images total, of which a little over 2,500 are the original glass negatives) were rescued for Historic New England by William Appleton, the founder of the Society.

Almost all are of maritime subjects; very little of his non-maritime work survives.

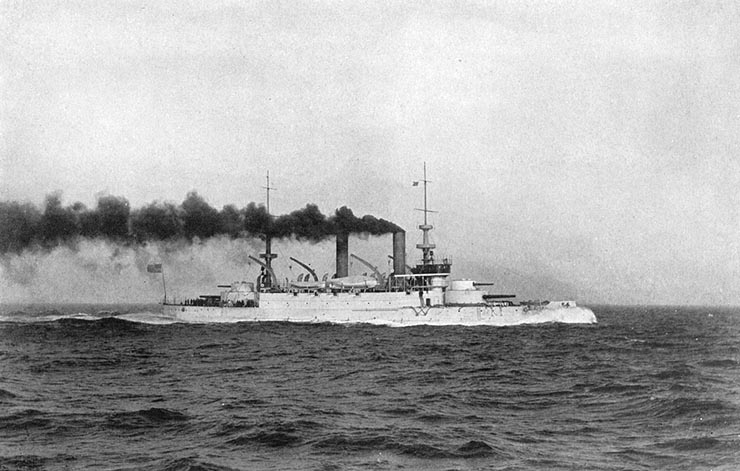
USS Kearsarge in 1899

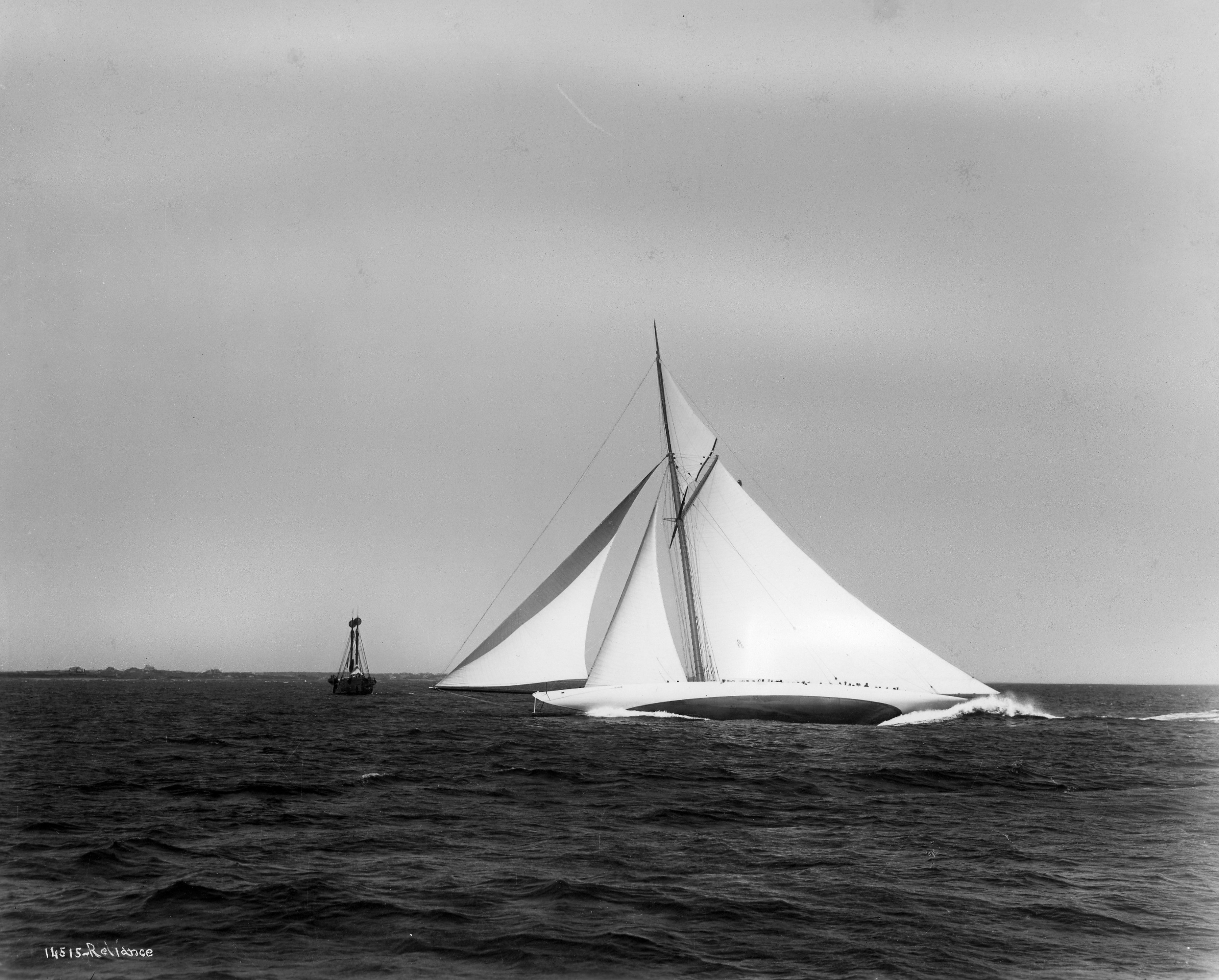
yacht Reliance in 1903

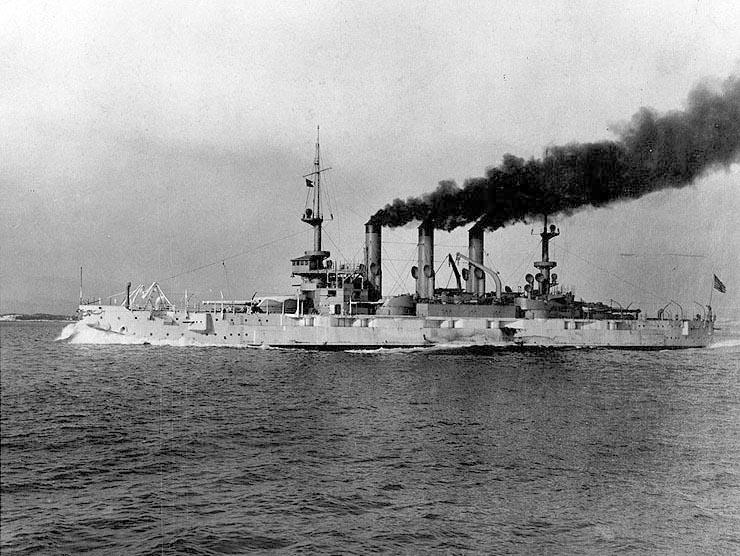
USS Kansas in 1906

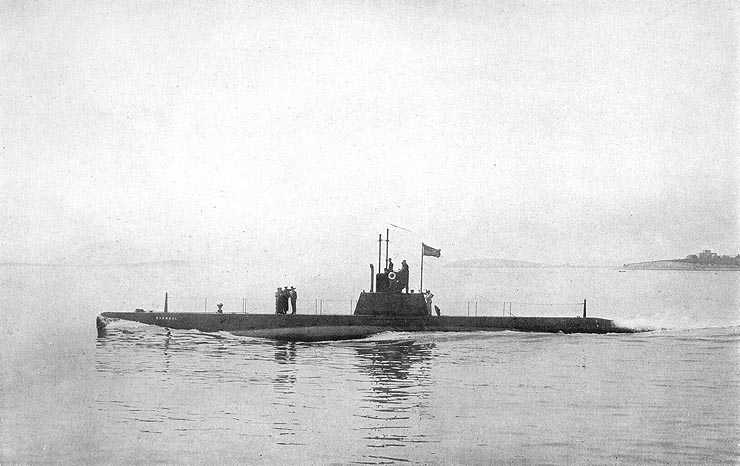
USS Narwhal around 1912

== Bibliography ==
- Nathaniel L. Stebbins, Edward Burgess, American & English Yachts (Charles Scribner's Sons, 1887)
- Nathaniel L. Stebbins, Yacht Portraits of the Leading American Yachts (Boston, 1887)
- Nathaniel L. Stebbins, Illustrated Coast Pilot with Sailing Directions: The Coast of New England from New York to Eastport, Maine, including Bays and Harbors (1891, first edition)
- Nathaniel L. Stebbins, Illustrated Coast Pilot with Sailing Directions: The Atlantic and Gulf Coasts of the United States, including Bays and Harbors (1896, second edition)
- Nathaniel L. Stebbins, The Yachtsman's Album (1896)
- Nathaniel L. Stebbins, George Dewey, The New Navy of the United States (1896)
- W. H. Bunting, Portrait of a Port: Boston 1852 - 1914 (Harvard University Press, Cambridge, 1974)
- Nathaniel L. Stebbins, W. H. Bunting, Steamers, Schooners, Cutters and Sloops: Marine Photographs of N. L. Stebbins Taken 1884-1907 (Houghton Mifflin, Boston, 1974)
