= Ambrose A. Martin =

American 19th century boat and ship builder

- Born: October 13, 1851; Boston, Massachusetts, US
- Died: January 1, 1934 (aged 82); Boston, Massachusetts, US
- Occupation: Shipbuilder
- Spouse: Lucy Anna Beadle
- Children: 3

Ambrose A. Martin (October 13, 1851 – January 1, 1934), was a 19th-century Boston, Massachusetts yacht and boat shipbuilder. He built the Ambrose A. Martin shipyard in 1882 at Jeffries Point, East Boston, where he built many notable Boston yachts and schooners. Martin died in Boston in 1934.

== Early life ==
Ambrose A. Martin was born on October 13, 1851 Boston, Massachusetts. He was the son of Elbridge Gerry Martin (1815-1873), born in Essex, Massachusetts, and Rebecca Homan Dixey (1816-1852). Ambrose married Lucy Anna Beadle on March 12, 1876. His father and son were both pilots. His grandfather, Captain Ambrose B. Martin (1773-1851) was Master of the two-masted Marblehead, Massachusetts schooner Raven. A set of ceramic dinner plates were made, in 1796, bearing a portrait of the vessel.

== Career ==
Ambrose A. Martin started a shipbuilding business in Boston, Massachusetts in 1882. He specialized in building yachts and schooners, carpentry and caulking, marine railway, repairing and painting. His shipyard was at Jeffries Point at the foot of Everett Street, East Boston.

On January 9, 1887, Martin was elected on the executive committee of the Hull Yacht Club at Parker House, in Hull, Massachusetts. He became director and secretary of the Jeffries Yacht Club at the Maverick House, East Boston, in February 1888. Martin was a judge at many of the Boston held regattas. On August 11, 1889, at the annual Jeffries Yacht Club Regatta, which was a race of nine miles out to Apple Island.

Martin was the commodore on the Edward Burgess designed fisherman schooner Nellie Dixon and was at her launch on March 2, 1889, at East Boston.

=== Pilot boats ===
Martin built several pilot boats. The Eben D. Jordan was a Boston pilot boat built in 1883 by Ambrose A. Martin in East Boston for Captain Thomas Cooper. Her namesake was Eben Dyer Jordan, the founder of the Jordan Marsh department stores. In 1892, she was sold to the New York Sandy Hook pilots.

The Columbia was a pilot boat that was launched from the Ambrose A. Martin's East Boston shipyard in 1894. She was built for pilot service for Captain Thomas Cooper, E. G. Martin, John C. Fawcett and Joseph Fawcett, to replace the pilot-boat Friend, No. 7. They wanted a more up-to-date vessel to challenge the Hesper, Varuna, and other faster boats of the Boston fleet. She was the first pilot boat to be built with a unique spoon bow and was extremely fast. In 1898, she was thrown ashore in the great Portland Gale, and remained on the Sand Hills beach in Scituate, Massachusetts for over thirty years as a marine curiosity.

The Minerva was a Boston pilot boat built in 1896 by Ambrose A. Martin of East Boston. She was owned by Franklin B. Wellock who was a Boston pilot for more than 55 years. The pilot-boat was named for his daughter, Minerva Hill. She was sold to Plymouth parties in 1901 to be used as a fishing vessel.

The Louise was built as a civilian schooner-rigged boat in 1900 by Ambrose A. Martin at Jefferies Point, East Boston. Martin was also one of the owners. She was a pilot boat, No. 2, from 1900-1917 and a United States Navy patrol vessel from 1917 to 1919. She was a replacement for the ill-fated Columbia. After the World War I the Louise returned to pilot service until 1924 when she was purchased as a yacht.

== Death ==
Ambrose A. Martin died, at age 82, on January 1, 1934, in Boston, Massachusetts. Funeral service were from the Bennison Funeral Home at the Winthrop Street Center.

== Gallery ==
Ambrose A. Martin built pilot boats:

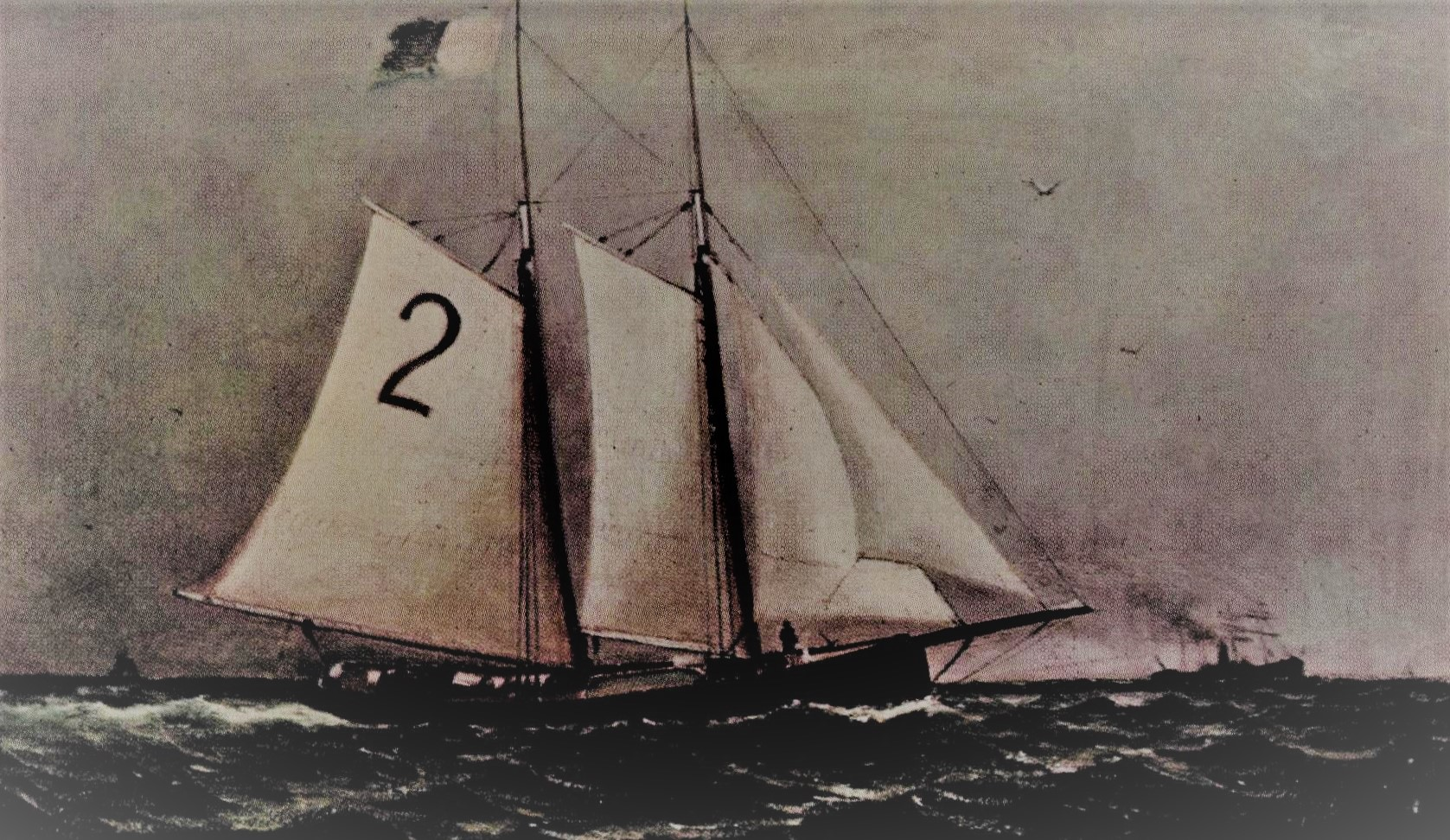
Pilot boat Eben D. Jordan.

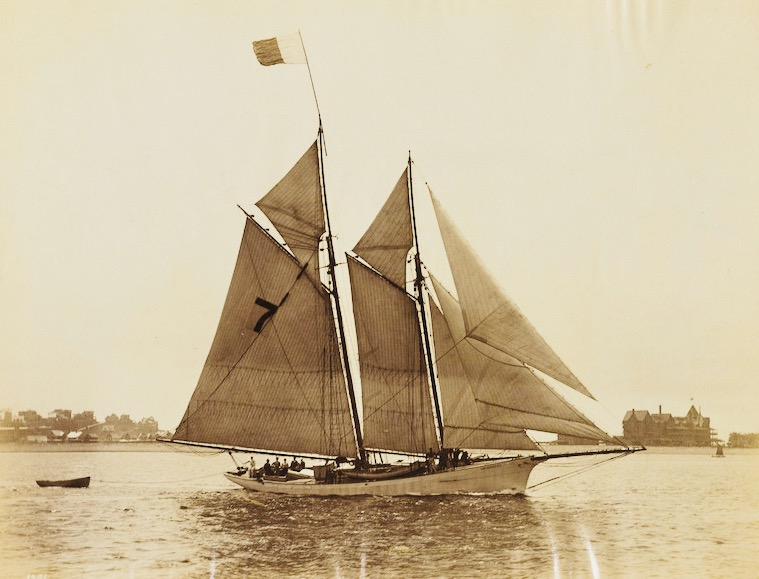
Pilot boat Minerva.

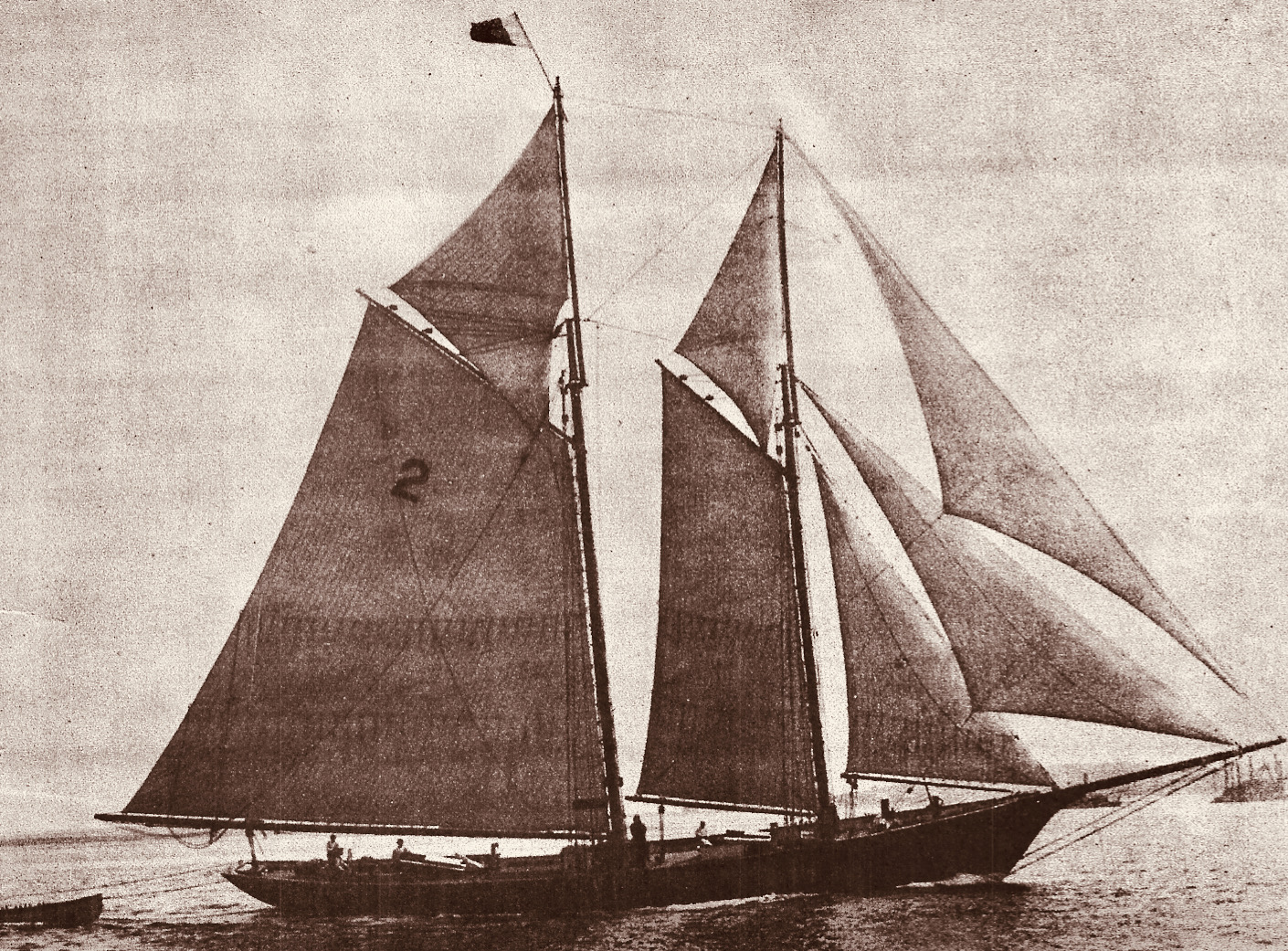
Pilot boat Columbia.

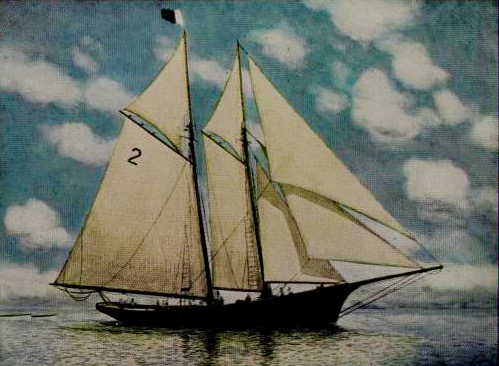
Pilot boat Louise.

== See also ==
- List of sailboat designers and manufacturers
