= Enchantress (pilot boat) =

Sandy Hook pilot boat

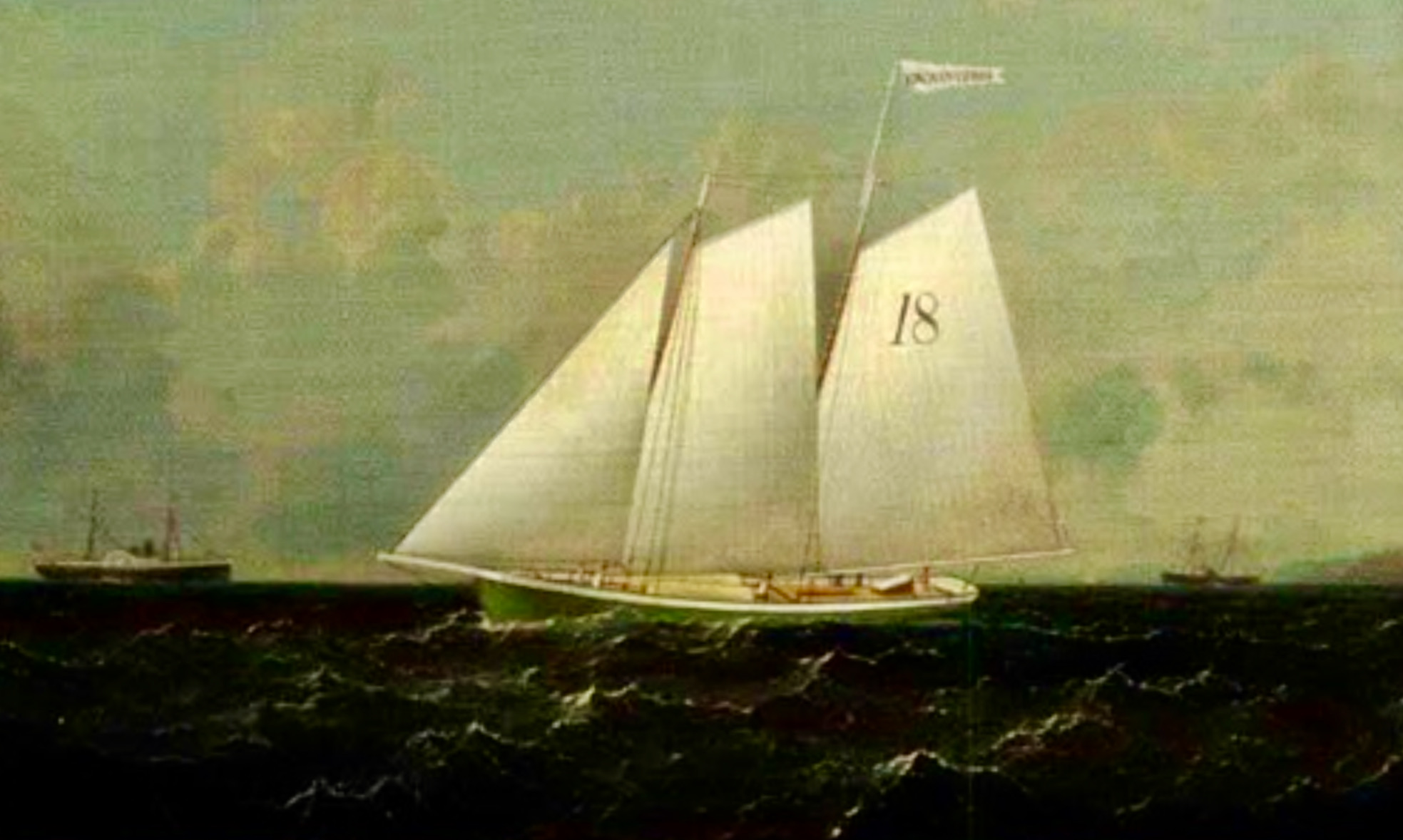
- Pilot Boat Enchantress, painting by Conrad Freitag.

History

United States
- Name: Enchantress
- Namesake: The Enchantress
- Owner: John Maginn; N. Y. Pilots
- Operator: T. H. Metcalf (1876-1884); Martino (1885); John Johnston; John Martineau; Frank Van Pelt; Daniel V. Jones; Henry Seguine, Jr.; Frederick Whitehead
- Builder: Westervelt & McKay
- Launched: November 14, 1851
- Out of service: March 13, 1888
- Fate: Sank

General characteristics
- Class & type: schooner
- Tonnage: 31-tons TM
- Length: 59 ft 0 in (17.98 m)
- Beam: 17 ft 0 in (5.18 m)
- Depth: 7 ft 2 in (2.18 m)
- Propulsion: Sail
- Notes: Hull is black with a golden stripe

The Enchantress was a 19th-century Sandy Hook pilot boat built in 1851 by John Maginn who named her after one of the cast in the opera The Enchantress. She was launched from the Westervelt & McKay shipyard. The Enchantress was one of the oldest pilot-boats in the service. She was Cornelius Vanderbilt's favorite pilot boat. The Enchantress went down with all hands in the Great Blizzard of 1888. The pilot boat James Stafford was built to replace her.

== Construction and service ==
The Sandy Hook pilot boat Enchantress was launched on November 14, 1851, from the shipyard of Westervelt & McKay, at the foot of Seventh Street. She was smaller boat weighing in at only 31-tons and 59 feet in length.

The Enchantress was built by pilot John Maginn who named her after one of the cast in the opera The Enchantress produced in 1884. Governor John Adams Dix appointed Maginn as harbourmaster and the Enchantress was sold to the Sandy Hook pilots.

The Enchantress, No. 18, was registered as a pilot Schooner with the Record of American and Foreign Shipping, from 1876 to 1885. Her ship master was T. H. Metcalf (1876–1884) and Martino (1885); her owners were New York Pilots; built in 1851 in New York; and her hailing port was the Port of New York. Her dimensions were 59 ft. in length; 17 ft. breadth of beam; 7.2 ft. depth of hold; and 31-tons Tonnage.

In 1860, the Enchantress was pilot boat No. 18 in the list of 21 pilot boats in the New York and New Jersey fleet.

On July 25, 1882, Commodore Cornelius Vanderbilt employed the Enchantress to take his ships in and out of the New York Harbor. Captain John Martineau and Frank Van Pelt were the two pilots that were part of the crew.

On April 1, 1884, the Enchantress, one of the oldest pilot-boats in the service, went adrift in a winter storm when she hit the schooner Sarah and Lucy. The crew of the pilot-boat consisted of six men. Pilots John Martineau and Frank Van Pelt jumped into the water and were picked up by the schooner and brought into port.

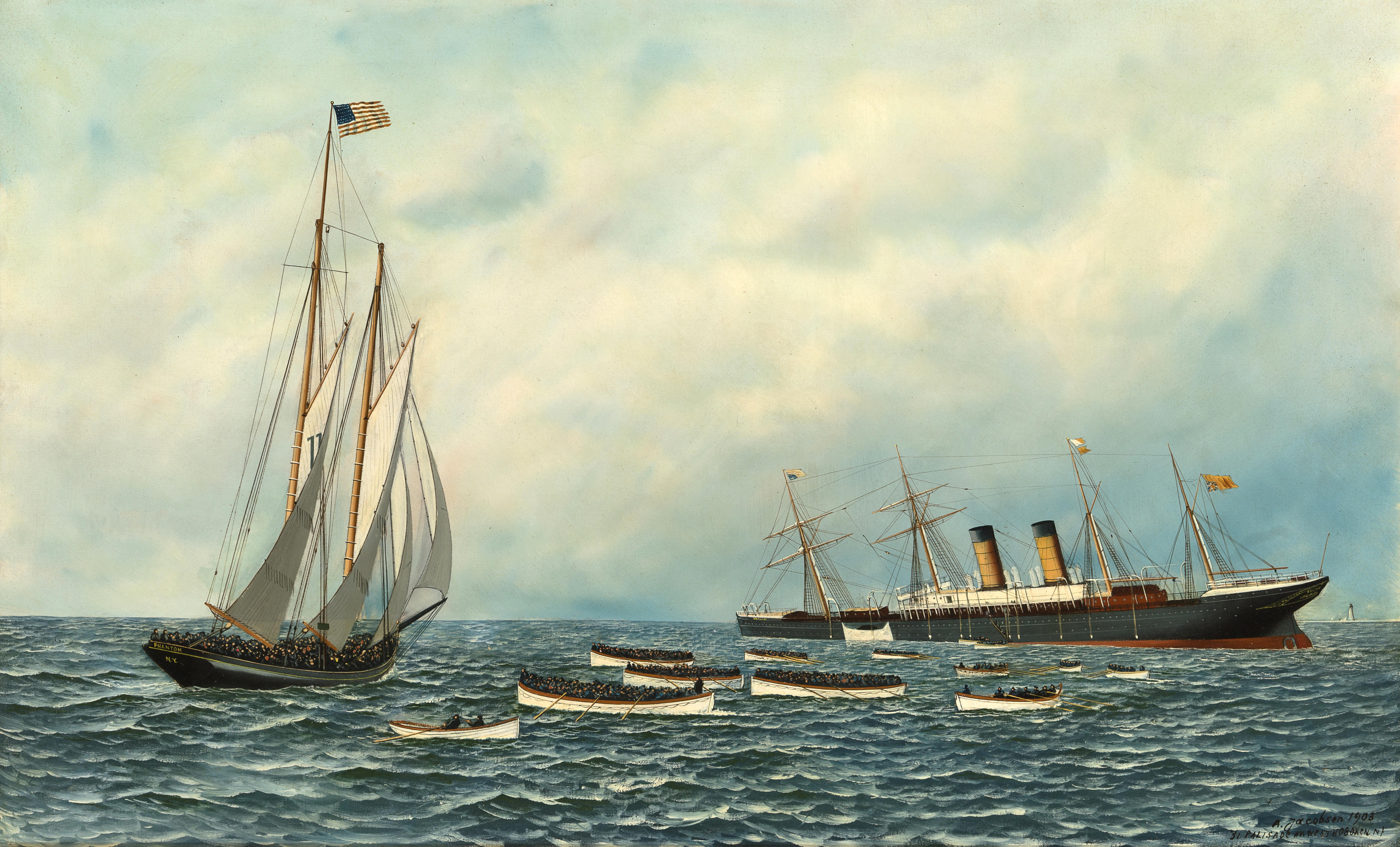
The Sinking of the S.S. Oregon

On April 21, 1886, the Enchantress, towed into Stapleton, Staten Island a yawl that belonged to the schooner, most likely the three-masted coal schooner Charles H. Morse that collided and sank the Cunard Line passenger steamer SS Oregon, off Fire Island with 845 people on board. The yawl was picked up 25 miles southeast of Navesink Highlands full of water.

== End of service ==
On March 13, 1888, the pilot-boat Enchantress went down with all hands in the Great Blizzard of 1888. Pilots John Johnston, John Martineau, Daniel V. Jones, Henry Seguine Jr., Frederick Whitehead, boatkeeper, and five sailors were among those that were lost.

The pilot-boat James Stafford was built to take the place of the Enchantress.

== See also ==
- List of Northeastern U. S. Pilot Boats
