= Thomas D. Harrison =

New Jersey Pilot boat

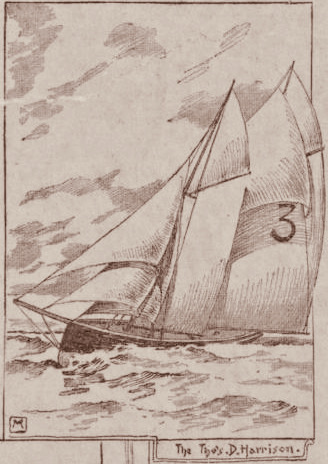
- Pilot Boat Thomas D. Harrison, No. 3.

History

United States
- Name: Thomas D. Harrison
- Namesake: Thomas D. Harrison
- Owner: New Jersey Pilots
- Operator: Thomas Dexter, Stephen Cooper
- Builder: J. S. Ellis & Son shipyard, New York
- Launched: 1875
- Out of service: January 26, 1897
- Fate: Sold

General characteristics
- Class & type: schooner
- Tonnage: 70 Thames Measurement
- Length: 80 ft 0 in (24.38 m)
- Beam: 22 ft 0 in (6.71 m)
- Draft: 10 ft 0 in (3.05 m)
- Depth: 7 ft 9 in (2.36 m)
- Propulsion: Sail

Thomas D. Harrison was a 19th-century New York pilot boat built for New Jersey pilots. She was launched from the Jacob S. Ellis & Son shipyard, at Tottenville, Staten Island in 1875. The Harrison went ashore in the Great Blizzard of 1888 with no lives lost. She continued as a pilot boat with Pilot Stephen Cooper in command. She was purchased in 1897 by Allerton D. Hitch and used for coastal trade in the Cape Verde islands off the west African coast.

== Construction and service ==
The Thomas D. Harrison was a pilot boat built in 1875. She was launched from the Jacob S. Ellis & Son shipyard at Tottenville, Staten Island. She was registered as a pilot Schooner with the Record of American and Foreign Shipping, from 1876 to 1882. Her ship master was Thomas Dexter and her owners were New Jersey Pilots; built in 1875 at Tottenville, Staten Island; and her hailing port was the Port of New York. Her dimensions were 80 ft. in length; 22 ft. breadth of beam; 7.9 ft. depth of hold; and 70-tons Tonnage.

On February 12, 1879, the pilot boat Thomas D. Harrison, No. 3, and was reported as a New York pilot boat that took on incoming pilots whom had finished piloting ships out to sea and were returning home.

During the terrible Blizzard of 1888, the Thomas D. Harrison, No. 3, went ashore in a secure anchorage at Bay Ridge, Brooklyn in the upper harbor without loss of life.

On August 24, 1893, Pilot Stephen Cooper of the pilot boat Thomas D. Harrison was 20 miles off the Highlands when he picked up the only survivor from a sinking three-masted 200-ton schooner Narragansett and was taken to Staten Island. The crew of five men were lost.

In the October 31, 1893, Annual Report Of The Board Of Commissioners Of Pilotage, Thomas D. Harrison, No. 3, was listed as one of the eight New Jersey Sandy Hook pilot boats. She was listed as weighing 69.72-tons

On January 27, 1894, the pilot boats Thomas D. Harrison, No. 3, and the Elbridge T. Gerry, No. 2, were in a race to reach the steamship Caracas, fifteen miles of Sandy Hook. Pilot Cooper reached the Caracas first and climbed aboard to bring the steamship into port.

The Thomas D. Harrison was listed as a New Jersey pilot-boat in 1895 with pilot Stephen Cooper in command. They were on regular pilot duties and brought in the steamer Massasoit into port.

== Out of service ==
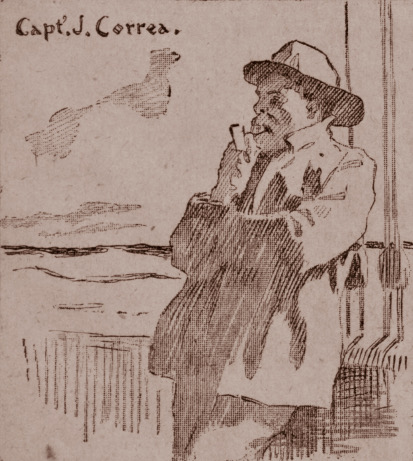
Pilot John Correa of the pilot boat Thomas D. Harrison.

On January 26, 1897, the Thomas D. Harrison went on a 4,000 mile voyage to São Vicente, Cape Verde off the west African coast. Captain John Correa took a crew of five men on the trip. The Harrison was purchased by Allerton D. Hitch and was used for coastal trade in the islands.

== See also ==
- List of Northeastern U. S. Pilot Boats
