= Augustus Van Pelt =

Boston Pilot

- Born: February 2, 1817; Richmond, New York, US
- Died: October 18, 1889 (aged 72); Tompkinsville, Staten Island, US
- Occupation: harbor pilot
- Spouse: Elizabeth Vanderbilt
- Children: 11

Augustus Van Pelt (February 2, 1817 – October 18, 1889) was a 19th-century New York Sandy Hook maritime pilot. He was captain of the pilot boat Isaac Webb, for 19 years. His son, Frank P. Van Pelt was also a well-known Sandy Hook Pilot.

== Early life ==
Captain Augustus Van Pelt was born in Richmond, New York, on 2 February 1817. His father was Peter Van Pelt and his mother was Catharine Van Pelt. He was married to Mary Elizabeth Vanderbilt and had eleven children. His son, Frank P. Van Pelt was also a well-known Sandy Hook Pilot.

== Career ==
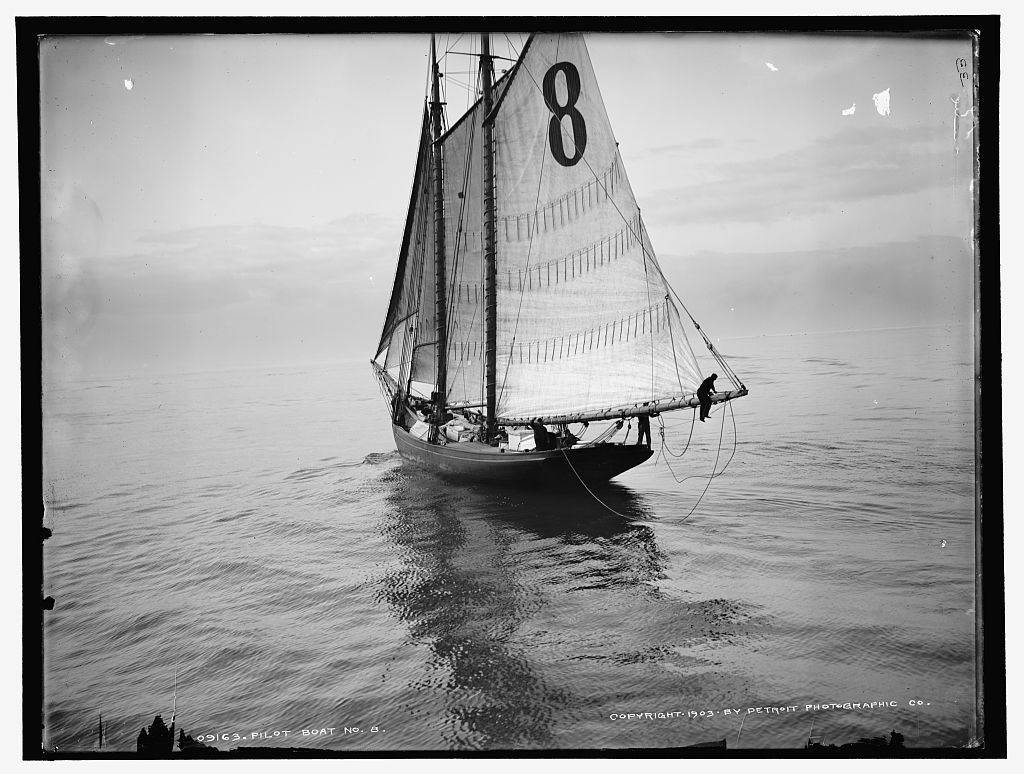
Pilot Boat Isaac Webb.

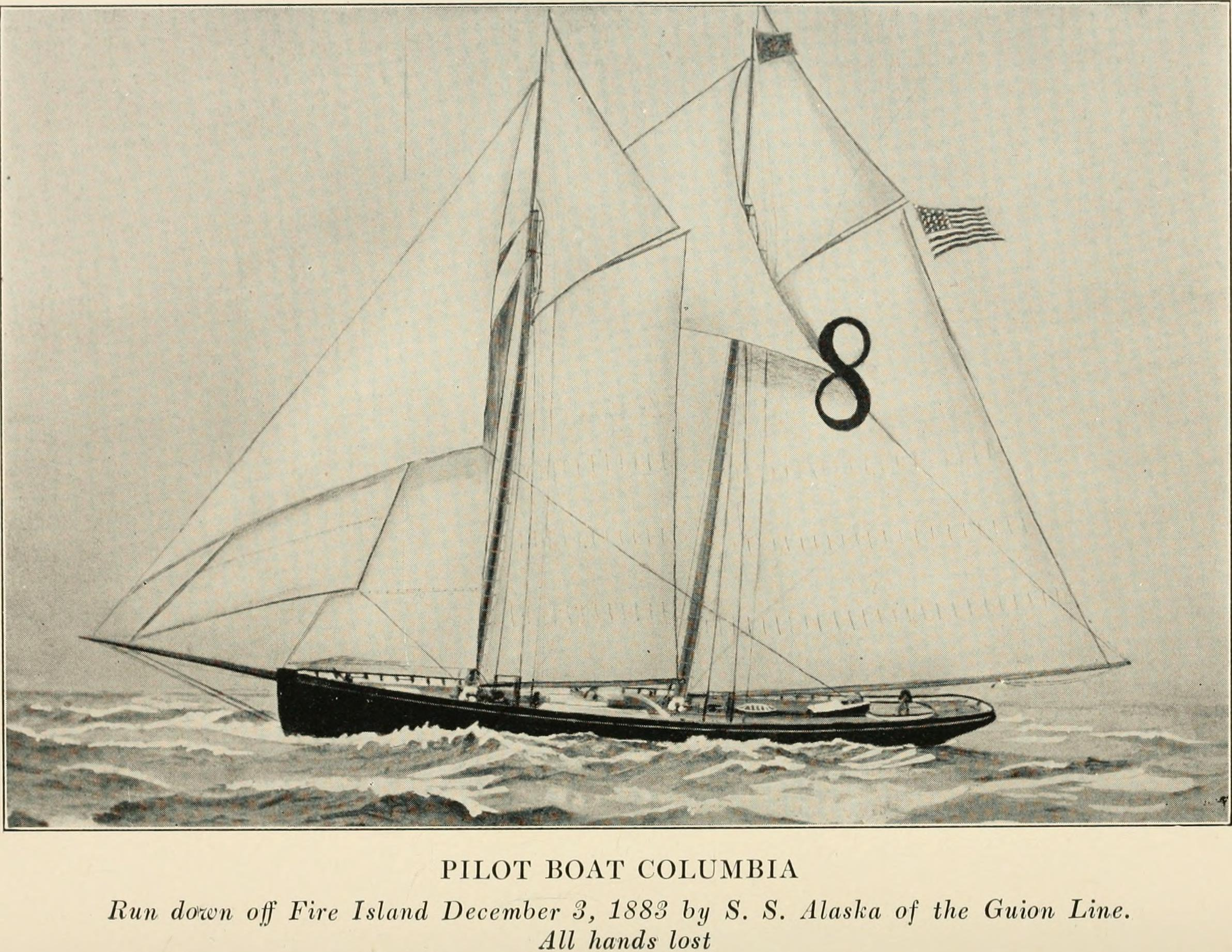
Pilot Boat Columbia.

Van Pelt received his license as a pilot in 1841. He was a pilot and part-owner of the pilot boats New York, Enchantress, Isaac Webb, and Columbia.

In 1845, Van Pelt and John McGinn lead an opposition to the newly formed Board of Pilot Commissioners. Van Pelt later realized that the fight against the board was a losing one. On October 10, 1860, Van Pelt signed a statement that he was satisfied with the representation that he had received from the New York Board of Commissioners of Pilots.

Van Pelt was in command of the pilot boat Isaac Webb, built for the New York Pilots' Association on October 31, 1860. He was registered as the ship master of the Isaac Webb in the American Lloyd's Register of American and Foreign Shipping from 1861 to 1879.

The pilot boat Columbia, No. 8, was built for Captain Van Pelt and other New York pilots, to take the place of the pilot boat Isaac Webb, No. 8, that went ashore in a dense fog off Point Judith, Rhode Island, in July 1879. At the launch, the christening was performed by Augustus Van Pelt's daughter, Mary Louis Van Pelt, who broke the customary bottle of champagne over the bow of the vessel. The company of captains that owned the Columbia were: Augustus Van Pelt, Benjamin Simonson, Henry E. Sequine, Stephen H. Jones, Christopher M. Wolf, and Daniel V. Jones.

In November 1879, Van Pelt, Captain Walter Brewer and Captain Josiah Johnson were on a New York Board of Commissioners of Pilots committee to confer with merchants and shipowners regarding legislation of a bill to reduce the pilot fees.

On December 2, 1883, the Columbia, No. 8, was run down and sank off Fire Island to the south shore of Long Island, New York, by the Guion Line steamer SS Alaska. All hands were lost in this disaster. Van Pelt was not on the Columbia, but still one of the owners. Van Pelt filed a lawsuit in the United States district court against the steamship claiming $18,100 in damages on behalf of the widows of the men that were lost on the pilot boat.

== Death ==
Van Pelt died on October 18, 1889, in Tompkinsville, Staten Island. Funeral services were held at his home. He was buried at the Moravian Cemetery in New Dorp, Staten Island.

== See also ==
- List of Northeastern U. S. Pilot Boats
