= USS Louise No. 2 =

Patrol vessel of the United States Navy

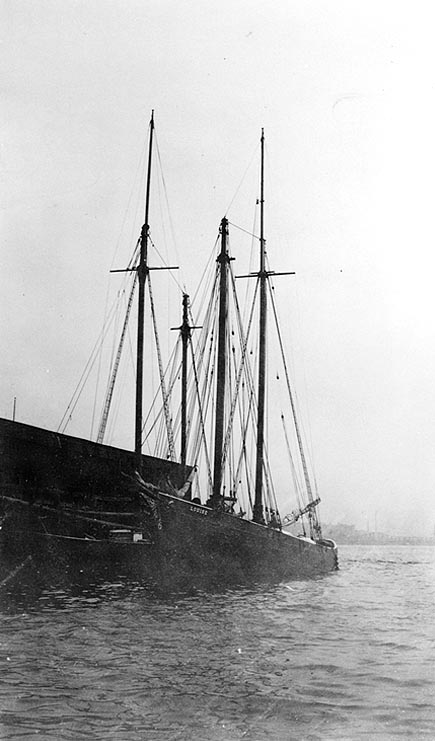
- Louise No. 2 around the time of acquisition by the United States Navy in September 1917

History

United States
- Name: USS Louise No. 2
- Namesake: John C. Fawcett's daughter
- Owner: Joseph Fawcett, John C. Fawcett, William V. Abbott, Bruce B. McLean, and Watson S. Dolliver
- Operator: Watson S. Dolliver, William V. Abbott, Joseph Fawcett, and John C. Fawcett
- Builder: Ambrose A. Martin, East Boston, Massachusetts
- Launched: 30 April 1900
- Christened: 30 April 1900
- Completed: 1900
- Acquired: Leased 10 September 1917; Delivered 19 September 1917
- Commissioned: 20 September 1917
- Decommissioned: 14 January 1919
- Fate: Returned to owner 14 January 1919
- Notes: Operated as civilian schooner-rigged pilot boat Louise No. 2 1900-1917 and from 1919

General characteristics
- Type: Patrol vessel
- Tonnage: 73 Gross register tons
- Displacement: 73 ft (22 m)
- Length: 104 ft (32 m)
- Beam: 23 ft (7.0 m)
- Draft: 13 ft 3 in (4.04 m)
- Propulsion: Sails plus auxiliary engine
- Sail plan: Schooner-rigged
- Speed: 9 knots
- Complement: 16
- Armament: 1 × .30-caliber (7.62-mm) machine gun

USS Louise No. 2 (SP-1230), sometimes written Louise # 2 and also referred to during her naval career as Louise and as Pilot Boat No. 2, was a United States Navy patrol vessel in commission from 1917 to 1919. The Louise, was a pilot boat from 1900 to 1917. She was a replacement for the pilot boat Columbia, that was washed ashore in 1898. After the World War I the Louise returned to pilot service until 1924 when she was purchased as a yacht. In 1924, the Boston pilot boat Pilot, took the place of the Louise.

== Construction and service ==
=== Pilot boat ===
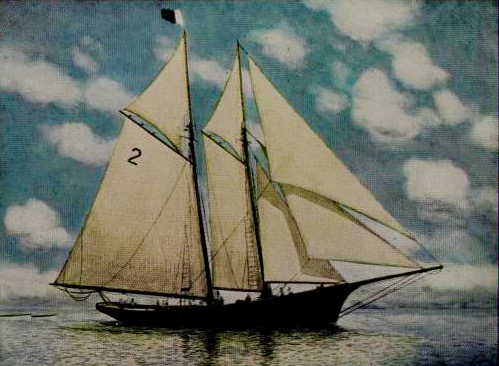
Pilot Boat Louise, No. 2

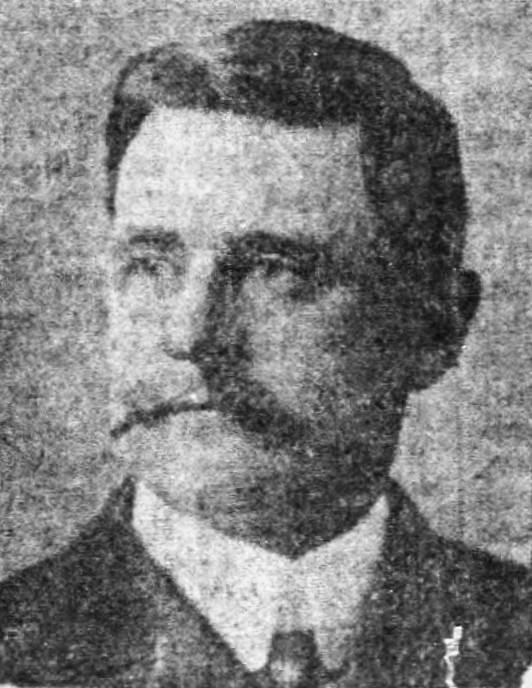
John C. Fawcett (Boston pilot)

Louise No. 2 was built as a civilian schooner-rigged pilot boat of the same name in 1900 by Ambrose A. Martin at East Boston, Massachusetts. She was a replacement for the ill-fated Columbia No. 8, that washed ashore at Sand Hills in Scituate, Massachusetts in the great 1898 Portland Gale.

She was launched on 30 April 1900 at the Ambrose Martin shipyard at Jeffries Point, with around 1,000 in attendance. The boat is owned by Joseph Fawcett, John C. Fawcett, William V. Abbott, Bruce B. McLean, and Watson S. Dolliver.

The Louise, No. 2, went on her maiden trip on Jun 25, 1900, from Lewis Wharf down the bay with 100 guests on board. She was a fast boat that made 12 knots on her trial trip. The Louise was named for John C. Fawcett's daughter. Her portrait was on the wall of the pilot's cabin. Congratulatory speeches were made by Mayor James Gould of Chelsea and others.

On October 17, 1900, Dolliver was on the Louise when he boarded the Cunard Line steamship Saxonia, with two pilots. On return to the pilot boat, Erick Ahlquist and William Weaver almost drowned when a wave filled the yawl with water and overturned it. The steamer was able to rescue the men and take them aboard the Saxonia. Pilots Joseph Fawcett, William V. Abbott, John C. Fawcett and Watson S. Dolliver sent a letter, that was posted in the Boston Globe, thanking Captain Pritchard and his officers and crew of the Saxonia for their heroic and successful efforts.

Dolliver was on the Louise when he picked up two escaped prisoners from Deer Island Prison, during a storm, in a raft near Graves Lightship on October 8, 1906.

On March 1, 1911, the Louise, No. 2, crashed into the British tramp steamship Pinar del Rio, in bad weather near the lighthouse channel. The Louise was trying to take off a pilot from the steamer when the crash occurred. The crew was transferred to the pilot boat Adams, No. 5.

=== Acquired by U.S. Navy ===
On 10 September 1917 the U.S. Navy acquired her under a free lease from her owner, the Boston Pilots Relief Society, for use as a section patrol boat during World War I. She was enrolled in the Naval Coast Defense Reserve on 15 September 1917, delivered to the Navy on 19 September 1917, and commissioned on 20 September 1917 as USS Louise No. 2 (SP-1230).

Assigned to the 1st Naval District in northern New England and based at Boston, Massachusetts, Liberty III served for the rest of World War I as a pilot boat in Boston Harbor as she had in civilian use, guiding inbound and outbound ships through the defensive sea area of the Port of Boston.

The Navy decommissioned Louise No. 2 on 14 January 1919 and returned her to the Boston Pilots Relief Society the same day.

== End of service ==
On December 9, 1924, the pilot boat Louise, No. 2, was withdrawn from pilot service and replaced with the pilot boat Pilot. The Pilot was in service for over fifty years before she was sold in 1976. She became the longest-serving pilot boat in American history.

On July 15, 1925, the pilot boat Louise was sold to W. R. Farrell of Long Wharf and converted into a yacht.

== See also ==
- List of Northeastern U.S. pilot boats
