= Elbridge T. Gerry (pilot boat) =

New York Pilot boat

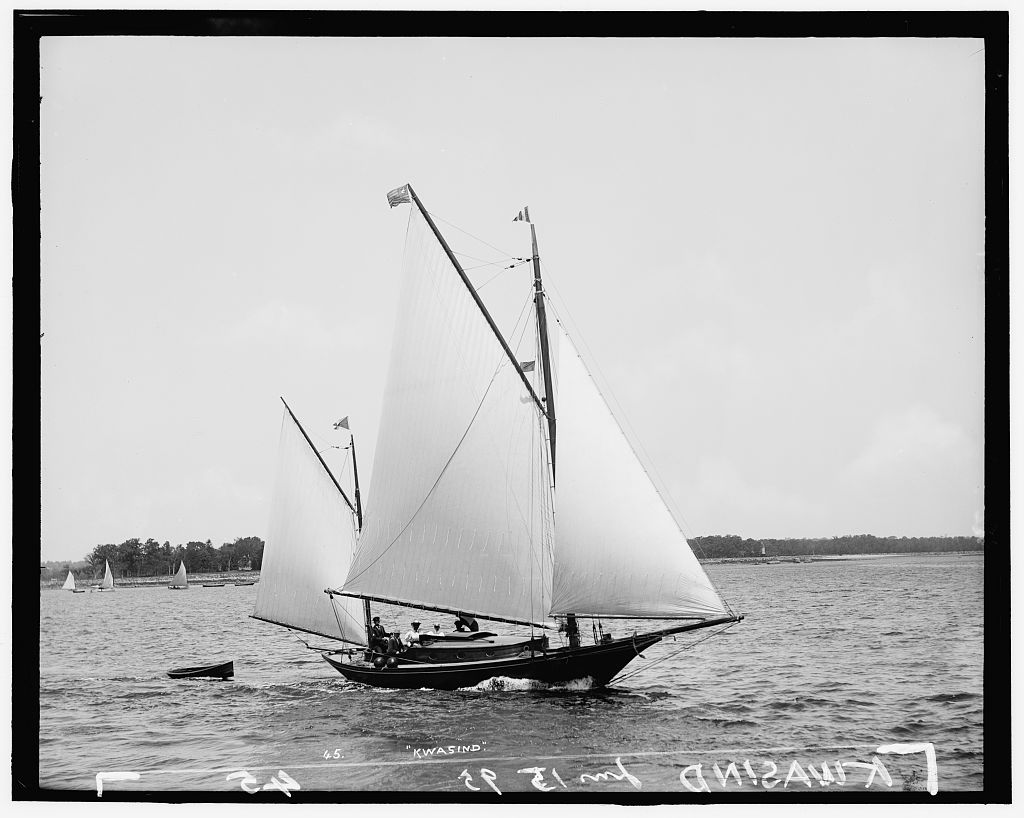
- Pilot boat Elbridge T. Gerry

History

United States
- Name: Elbridge T. Gerry
- Namesake: Elbridge Thomas Gerry
- Owner: Captain B. J. Guiness; Hiram Treat; John Reardon; Edward Earl; Charles Foster; William Hurrall
- Cost: $13,000
- Launched: August 24, 1888
- Out of service: December 13, 1896
- Renamed: Kwasind
- Homeport: Port of New York
- Fate: Sold

General characteristics
- Tons burthen: 62-tons
- Length: 80 ft 0 in (24.38 m)
- Beam: 21 ft 8 in (6.60 m)
- Propulsion: schooner sail
- Sail plan: Schooner-rigged; 70 ft 0 in (21.34 m)foremast; 71 ft 0 in (21.64 m) mainmast

Elbridge T. Gerry was a 19th-century New York Sandy Hook pilot boat built in 1888 at the Robinson & Waterhouse shipyard in City Island, Bronx. She was named in honor of Elbridge Thomas Gerry, a commodore of the New York Yacht Club. She served as a pilot boat from 1888 to 1896, when she was sold for offshore yachting cruises. Her name was changed to Kwasind, after the strongman in Henry Wadsworth Longfellow's Song of Hiawatha.

== Construction and service ==
Elbridge T. Gerry was launched on August 24, 1888, from the shipyard of Robinson & Waterhouse, City Island, Bronx. The launch was witnessed many invited quests. She was owned by pilots Captain B. J. Guiness, Hiram Treat, John Reardon, Edward Earl, Charles Foster and William Hurrall. She was christened by Amelia Guinness, the captain's daughter. She was named in honor of Elbridge Thomas Gerry, a commodore of the New York Yacht Club. The Gerry became a pilot boat of the Sandy Hook pilot fleet. She took the place of the pilot boat Ezra Nye, which on March 12, 1888, drifted and went ashore near the southern end of the Manhattan Beach Railroad pier in the Great Blizzard of 1888. Her dimensions were 80 ft. in length; 21.8 ft. breadth of beam and carried 25-tons of ballast and 62-tons. Her foremast was 70-ft and her mainmast 71-ft high. She cost $13,000.

On October 15, 1893, the pilot boat Elbridge T. Gerry, dragged her anchors and started to drift ashore off Staten Island. She was rescued by a tugboat and brought into port.

On January 27, 1894, the pilot boats Thomas D. Harrison, No. 3, and Elbridge T. Gerry, No. 2, were in a race to see who could reach the steamship Caracas first, which was fifteen miles off Sandy Hook. Pilot Cooper came to the Caracas first and climbed aboard to bring the steamship into port.

The Elbridge T. Gerry was listed as one of the eight New Jersey Sandy Hook pilot boats in 1891 before the age of steamboats, which reduced the number of sailboat pilot schooners.

== End of service ==
On December 13, 1896, the 60-ton New York pilot boat Elbridge T. Gerry was purchased by Edgar Harding of Boston and went to Lawley's shipyard in Boston to be fitted for offshore yachting cruises.

On Jan 31, 1897, the New York pilot boat Elbridge T. Gerry changed her name to Kwasind, after the strongman in Henry Wadsworth Longfellow's Song of Hiawatha. Captain William K. Nickerson of Provincetown, Massachusetts, was in command of the schooner-yacht in preparation for a West Indies cruise and then to Labrador.

On April 16, 1901, Captain Frederick T. Horton and Captain Charles W. Henderson of the schooner Kwasind, sailed past Bermuda down to Fernando de Noronha, off the Brazilian coast. They were on a treasure hunt for gold but did not find the gold treasure that was supposed to be on the island.

== See also ==
- List of Northeastern U. S. Pilot Boats
