= Columbia (pilot boat) =

Sandy Hook Pilot boat

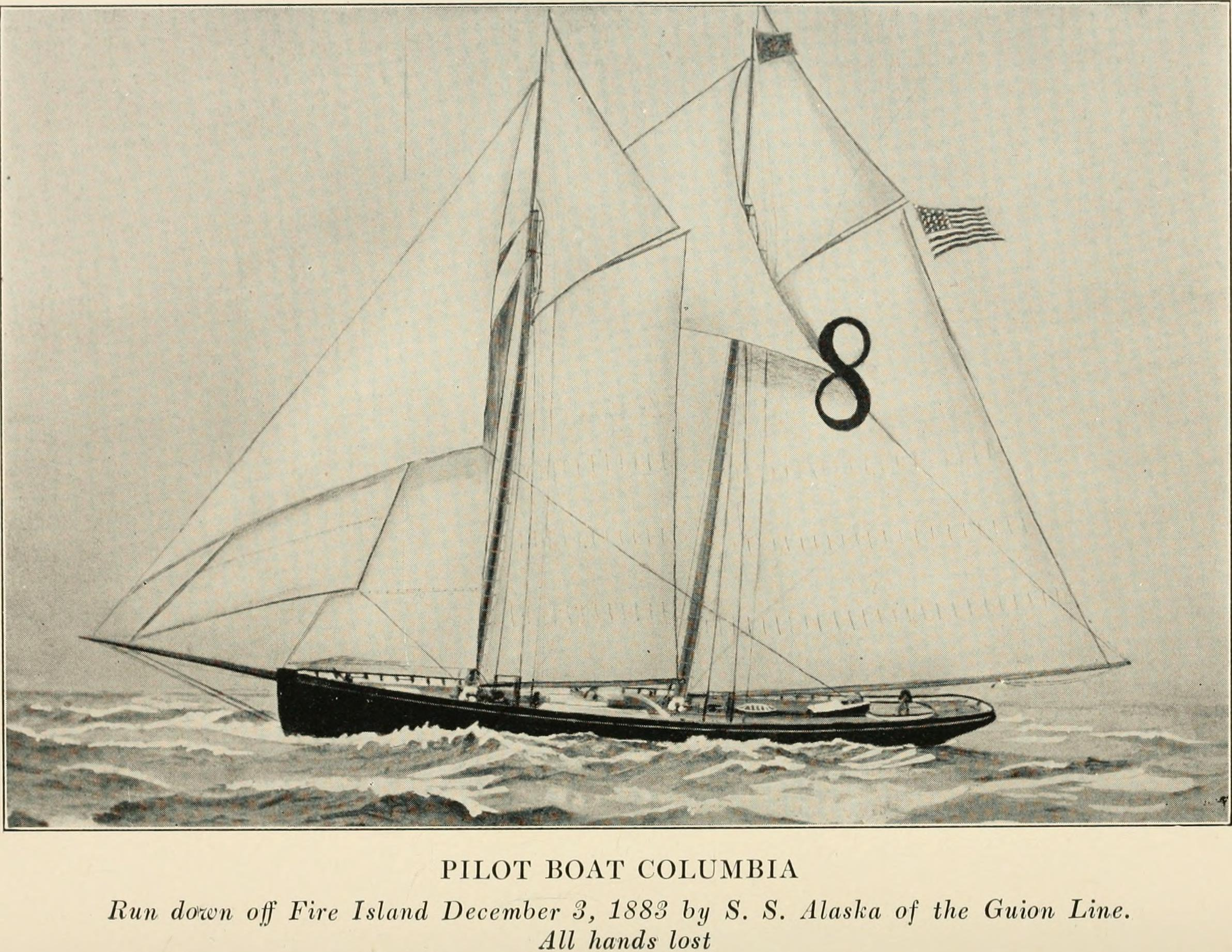
- Pilot Boat Columbia

History

United States
- Name: Columbia
- Owner: Augustus Van Pelt; Benjamin Simonson; Henry Seguine; Stephen H. Jones; Christopher M. Wolf; Daniel V. Jones
- Operator: Henry Seguine
- Builder: C. & R. Poillon, Brooklyn, New York
- Cost: $16,000
- Launched: November 15, 1879
- Out of service: December 3, 1883
- Fate: Sank

General characteristics 1st Columbia
- Class & type: schooner
- Tonnage: 90 TM
- Length: 87 ft 0 in (26.52 m)
- Beam: 21 ft 4 in (6.50 m)
- Draft: 82 ft 0 in (24.99 m)
- Depth: 8 ft 6 in (2.59 m)
- Propulsion: Sail
- Sail plan: 75 ft 0 in (22.86 m)
- Notes: Maryland oak with Locust Stanchions

History

United States
- Name: Columbia
- Owner: Captain Thomas Cooper
- Operator: Thomas Cooper, E. G. Martin, John C. Fawcett and Joseph Fawcett
- Builder: Ambrose A. Martin
- Cost: $16,000
- Launched: May 17, 1894
- Out of service: November 26, 1898
- Fate: Sank

General characteristics 2nd Columbia
- Class & type: schooner
- Tonnage: 89 TM
- Length: 95 ft 0 in (28.96 m)
- Beam: 21 ft 4 in (6.50 m)
- Depth: 12 ft 0 in (3.66 m)
- Propulsion: Sail
- Speed: 14 knots
- Notes: Painted black, Spars by Henry Pigeon

The Columbia was a 19th-century pilot boat built C. & R. Poillon shipyard in 1879 for Sandy Hook and New York pilots that owned the Isaac Webb, which was lost off Quonochontaug Beach, Long Island in July 1879. She was run down by the Guion Line steamer SS Alaska in 1883. A second pilot-boat, also named Columbia, was built by Ambrose A. Martin at East Boston in 1894 that had a unique spoon bow and was extremely fast. She was thrown ashore in the great Portland Gale, and remained on the Sand Hills beach in Scituate, Massachusetts for over thirty years as a marine curiosity. The Louise No. 2 replaced the ill-fated Columbia.

== First Columbia pilot boat ==
=== Construction and service ===
The original Columbia, was launched on November 15, 1879, by the C. & R. Poillon shipyard at the foot of Bridge Street, Brooklyn, New York. The boat was built for Captain Augustus Van Pelt and other New York pilots, to take the place of the Isaac Webb, pilot-boat No. 8. The Web, went ashore in a dense fog off Point Judith, Rhode Island in July 1879.

At the launch, the christening was performed by Augustus Van Pelt's daughter, Mary Louis Van Pelt, who broke the customary bottle of champagne over the bow of the vessel. The company of captains that owned the Columbia were: Augustus Van Pelt, Benjamin Simonson, Henry Seguine, Stephen H. Jones, Christopher M. Wolf, and Daniel V. Jones.

The Columbia was in several accidents. On February 3, 1880, during a winter storm, the Columbia No. 8 placed a pilot on board the inbound Guion Line steamship Arizona, twenty-five miles from Sandy Hook. Several pilots from the Columbia were thrown into the sea. The Arizona was able to rescue the pilots and bring them on board. The Columbia managed to make it to Newport, Rhode Island with her flags flying half mast.

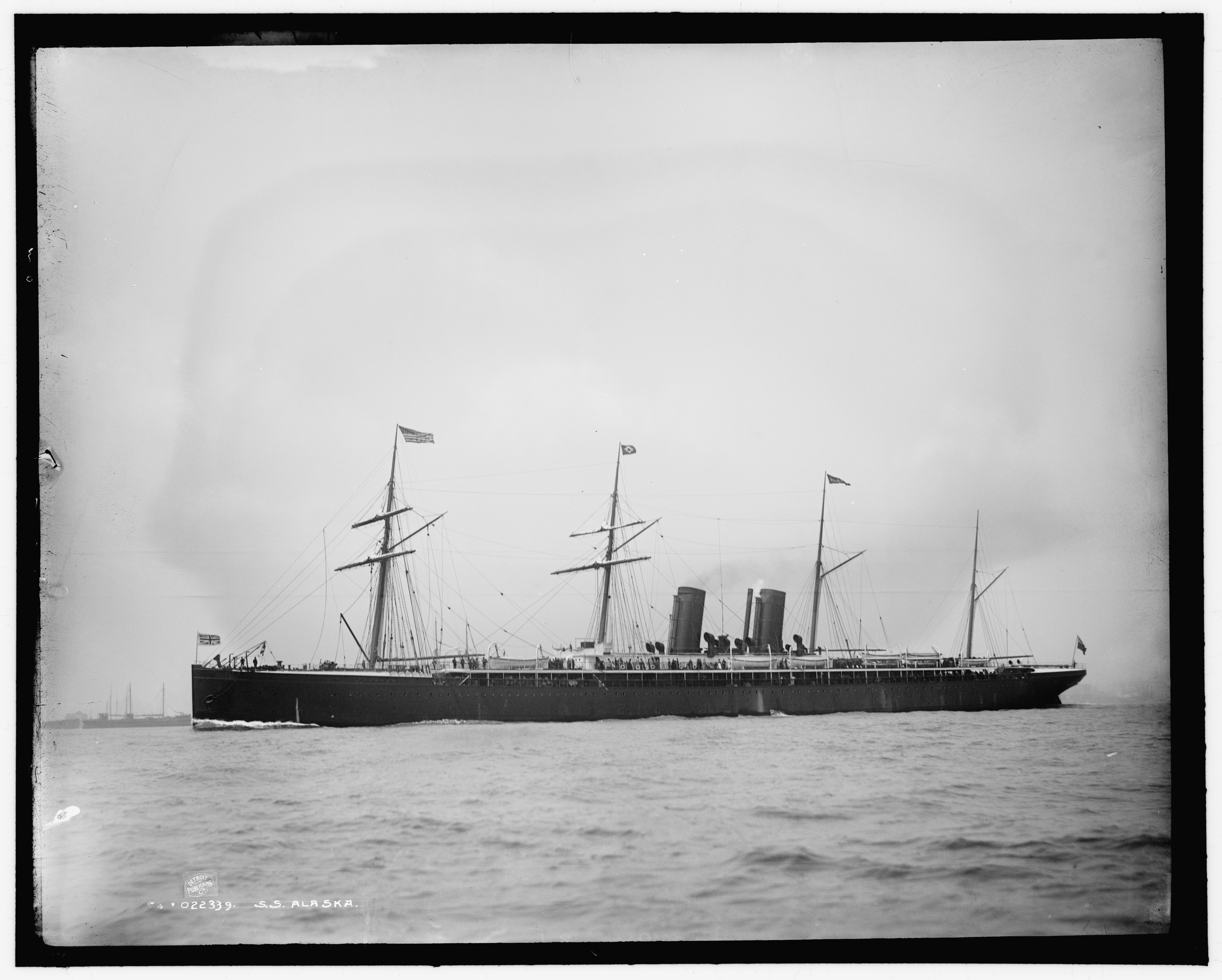
Guion Line ocean liner SS Alaska (1881).

On March 27, 1883, the Columbia was struck 45 miles southeast of Sandy Hook, by the Holland America Line Rotterdam of the Netherlands Mall Line. She was able to be towed into New York City for repairs.

On December 2, 1883, the Columbia, No. 8, was run down and sank off Fire Island to the south shore of Long Island, New York, by the Guion Line steamer SS Alaska. The Alaska smashed into the Columbia and split her in two. the All hands were lost in this disaster. The report of the loss of the Columbia showed the danger that pilots encountered when trying to board a steamship in rough weather. The names of the six pilots that perished were: Christian Wolf, Thomas H. Metcalf, Ralph Noble, Charles Arnold, William White, and Abraham Jones. Henry Seguine, one of the surviving owners, said that Captain Murray of the Alaska should have let his engines remain quiet to avoid the accident and allow the pilot to board the vessel.

== Second Columbia pilot boat ==
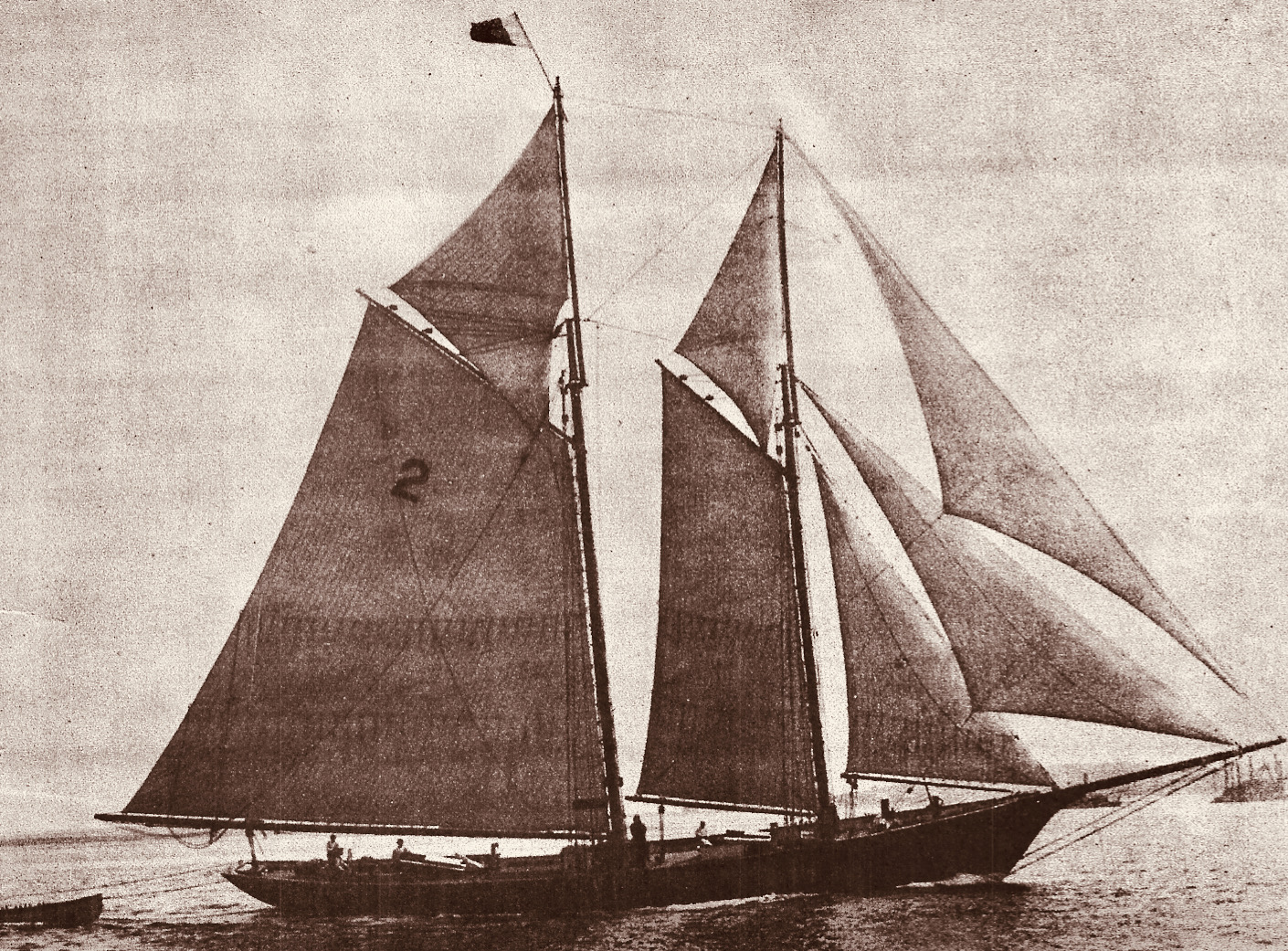
Pilot boat Columbia, No. 2.

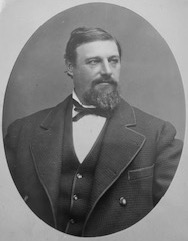
Captain Thomas Cooper.

On May 17, 1894, a new, bigger 95-feet pilot-boat Columbia, was launched from the Ambrose A. Martin's East Boston, Massachusetts shipyard. She was built for pilot service for Captain Thomas Cooper E. G. Martin, John C. Fawcett and Joseph Fawcett, to replace the pilot-boat Friend, No. 7. They wanted a more up-to-date vessel to challenge the Hesper, Varuna, and other faster boats of the Boston fleet. She was the first pilot boat to be built with a modified spoon bow. She was registered as Number 2, for the Boston Pilots under command of Captain Cooper. After her launch she was towed to Battery Wharf, where she took on ballast. She was rigged by Francis Lowe & Sons.

After being in service for only three months, the Columbia, was struck by the John B. Manning, of New York, a four-masted schooner on September 26, 1894. The schooner struck the Columbia on the port bow. She was damaged but made it back into port at East Boston. Captain Thomas Cooper was the pilot on the Columbia.

On December 5, 1897, the Columbia, No. 2, was struck by the ocean liner City of Macon, when she was preparing to leave port. Captain Cooper was on board at the time of the accident.

On April 3, 1898, Charles I. Lampee, during spring vacation, went on a cruise with his grandfather skipper Thomas Cooper. They went three hundred miles from Boston when they came across the steamer Warren Line Norseman. The pilot flag was set and pilot John Fawcett rowed a yawl to the steamer to climb on board. Pilot William Abbott boarded another Warren Line steamship, the Otoman.

== End of service ==
On November 26, 1898, while returning to Boston from the outer station, after putting Thomas Cooper, William Abbott, John Fawcett, Joseph Fawcett and Axel Olsen aboard incoming vessels, the Columbia was driven ashore at the notorious Sand Hills beach in Scituate in the great Portland Gale with the loss of all five men aboard. She was designed for rough weather and was only four years old. Other vessels were wrecked and homes were smashed in the winter storm. The giant seas tossed the Columbia into a seaside cottage. When the railroad line was open, Captain Cooper went to see the wreck, and realizing she could not be salvaged, sold her to a marine junk dealer for $300. She originally cost $12,00 to build. The shell of her remained on the beach at Sand Hills for over thirty years as a marine curiosity. For two days, patrolmen of the North Scituate Station picked their way through the wreckage during a snowstorm. Captain Cooper, who was not on board the Columbia, was transferred to the pilot-boat Varuna, No. 6, that he had ownership with. Cooper was never the same after the loss of the Columbia and the men that served with him for a number of years.

The Louise No. 2 replaced the ill-fated Columbia.

== See also ==
- List of Northeastern U. S. Pilot Boats
