= Isaac Webb (pilot boat) =

Sandy Hook Pilot boat

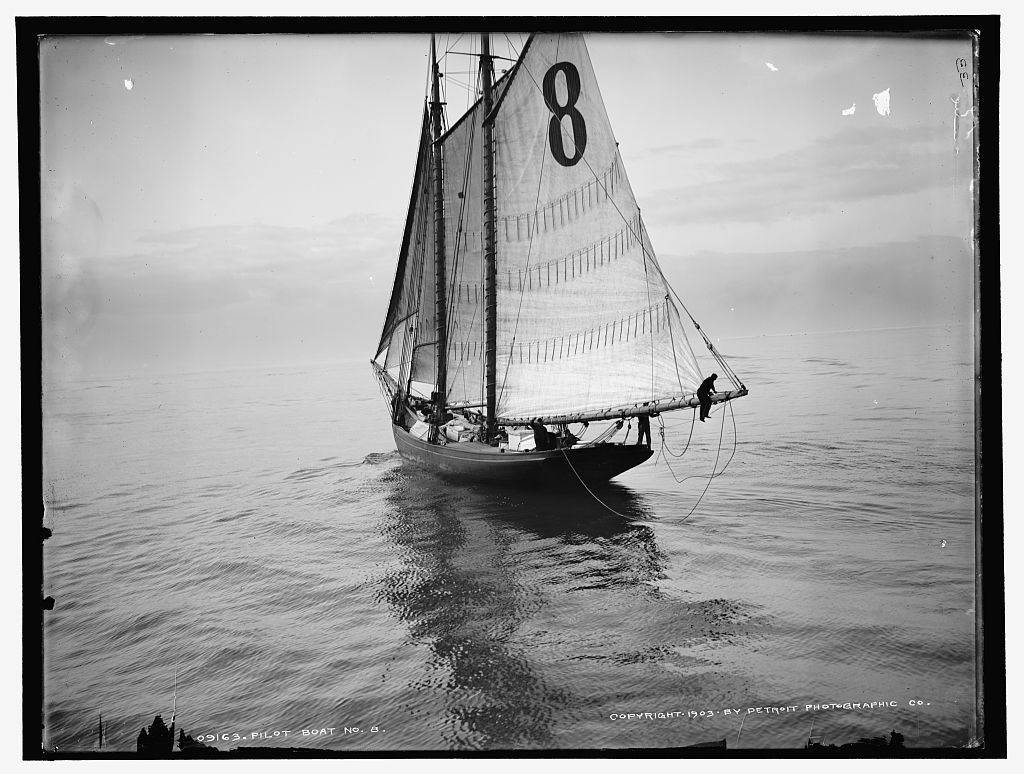
- Pilot Boat, No. 8

History

United States
- Name: Isaac Webb
- Namesake: Isaac Webb, shipbuilder
- Owner: N. Y. Pilots
- Operator: Augustus Van Pelt; Henry Seguine; Stephen H. Jones
- Builder: Webb & Bell shipyard, Brooklyn, New York
- Cost: $8,500
- Launched: October 31, 1860
- Out of service: July 27, 1879
- Fate: Sank

General characteristics
- Class & type: schooner
- Tonnage: 96 TM
- Length: 70 ft 0 in (21.34 m)
- Beam: 20 ft 0 in (6.10 m)
- Depth: 7 ft 6 in (2.29 m)
- Propulsion: Sail

Isaac Webb was a 19th-century Sandy Hook pilot boat built in 1860 by Webb & Bell for the New York and Sandy Hook pilots. She received a reward by the Board of Pilot Commissioners of New York for saving three sailors from the wreck of the bark Sarah, that was caught up in a hurricane. Isaac Webb was shipwrecked in a dense fog at Quonochontaug Beach, Long Island in 1879. She was replaced by pilot boat Columbia.

== Construction and service ==
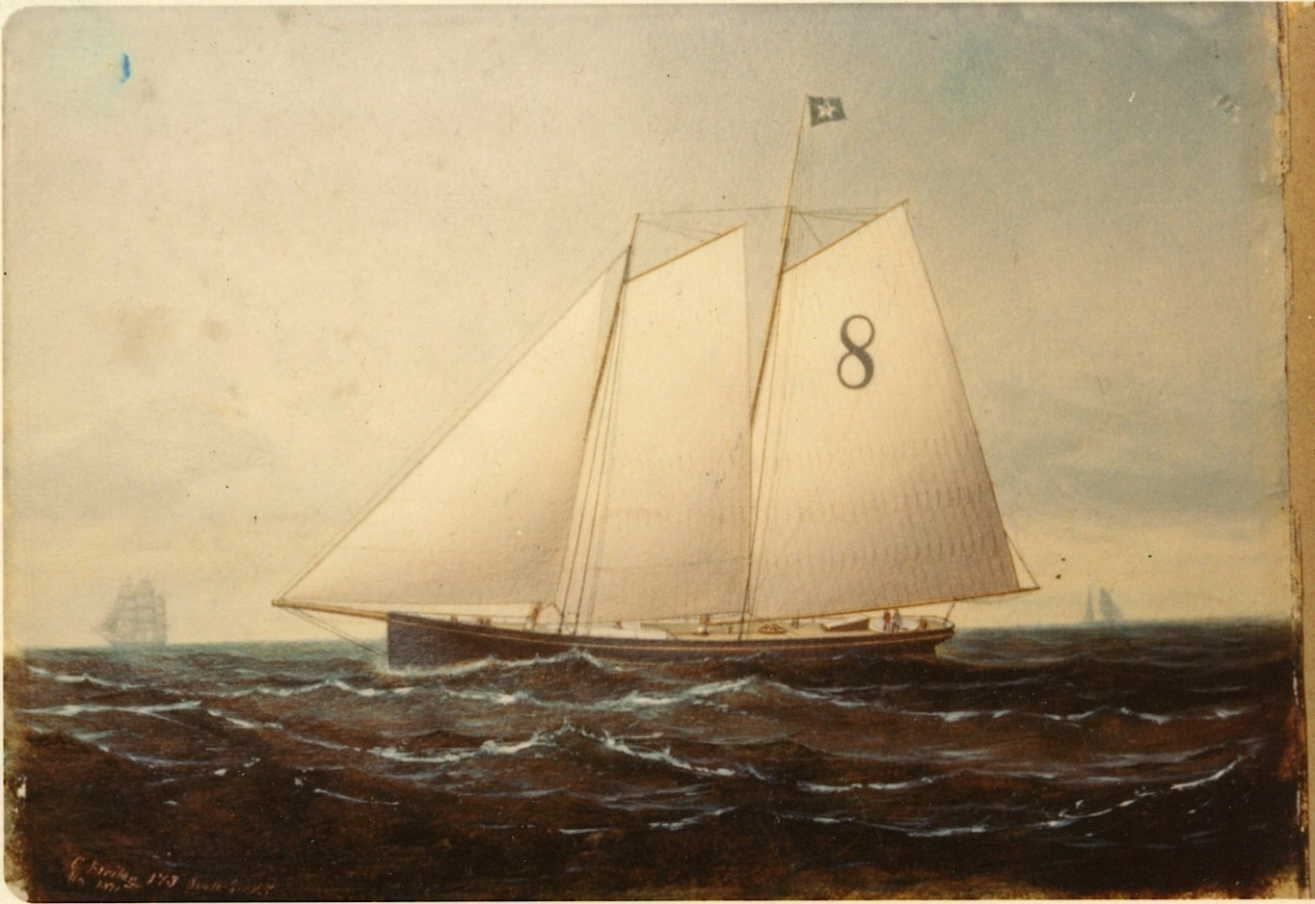
Pilot boat Isaac Webb No. 8.

Eckford Webb, son of Isaac Webb teamed up with George W. Bell and created the Webb & Bell shipyard at Milton Street in Greenpoint, Brooklyn. The shipyard launched the 96-ton pilot-boat Isaac Webb, for the New York and Sandy Hook pilots on October 31, 1860. Captain Augustus Van Pelt was in command of the boat.

In 1860, Isaac Webb, No. 8, was one of only twenty-one New York pilot boats in the Sandy Hook fleet. On October 10, 1860, New York Sandy Hook Pilot Augustus Van Pelt, of the pilot boat Isaac Webb, No. 1, signed a statement along with other pilots, that he was satisfied with the representation he had received from the New York Board of Commissioners of Pilots.

The Isaac Webb is listed in the Index to Ship Registers from 1861 to 1879 with Captain Augustus Van Pelt and Captain Freeman as masters of the boat. The N. Y. Pilots were listed as the owner.

On January 17, 1866, pilots Henry Seguine and Stephen H. Jones were on Isaac Webb when he encountered Mary A. Boardman, from Morehead City bound to New York that was grounded on the Romer Shoals. The pilots were able to save the twenty-three passengers on board. Captain Jourdan, of the Boardman, presented the ensign of his vessel to Pilot Seguine as a memento for heroic efforts.

On August 5, 1867, Henry Seguine from the pilot-boat Isaac Webb, No. 8, wrote a letter of thanks to the American Seamen's Friend Society, for use of a library that was placed on board the vessel for the benefit of the crew.

On September 18, 1870, Henry Seguine on the pilot-boat Isaac Webb, encountered a hurricane and came across the bark Edward of Maitland, Nova Scotia, which was leaking with nine feet of water in her hold. She was abandoned by her captain and crew. The pilot boat Hope, No. 1 had already arrived and tried to pump out the water. Through the night, the bark gained more water, but Hope did not want Isaac Webb to help because they thought she would sink. Seguine believed they could have saved her with the assistance of both boats.

On October 14, 1871, the pilot-boat Isaac Webb, while cruising discovered the British brig Wexford in distress. She towed the brig for nine days and brought her into the New York harbor. She was promised $2,500 for the services for towing the brig to port safely. The amount was contested and a settlement was reached for $1,000.

Isaac Webb rescued the crew of the whaling bark Sarah, of New Bedford, Massachusetts, on October 16, 1878, forty miles south of Block Island with three survivors. Twenty-two of the crew perished. The Sarah had been caught up in a hurricane and was lying on its side, a floating wreck. The Web transferred the survivors to the F. S. Negus, No. 1 that carried them to Stonington, Connecticut. The Board of Pilot Commissioners of New York, voted to give a reward of $150.00 to the pilot-boat Isaac Webb for saving the three sailors from the wreck of the bark Sarah.

== End of service ==
On July 23, 1879, the pilot-boat Isaac Webb, No. 8 was reported as being on a cruise with Captain Van Pelt on board. In late July 27, Isaac Webb went ashore in a dense fog at Quonochontaug Beach, Long Island. The Coast Wrecking Company was sent to assist her. She was shipwrecked and was a total loss. She was valued at $8,000 and was covered by insurance. The Pilot Boat Columbia, was built to replace Isaac Webb.

== See also ==
- List of Northeastern U. S. Pilot Boats
