= John C. Fawcett =

Boston Pilot

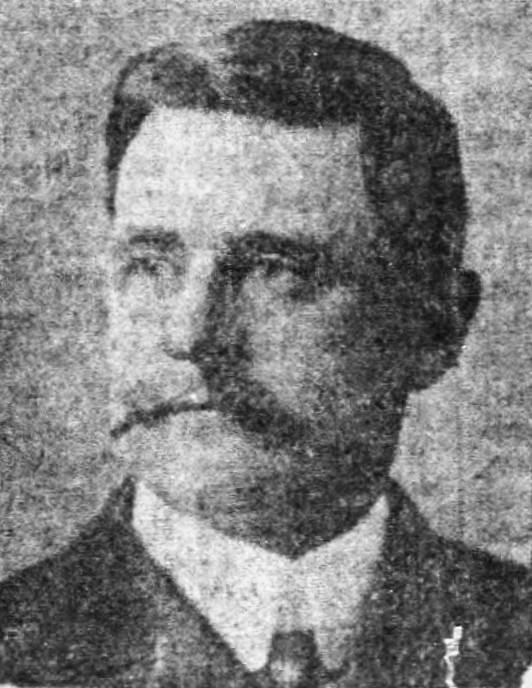
- John C. Fawcett (Boston Pilot).
- Born: January 1, 1859; Yorkshire, Northern England US
- Died: July 7, 1909 (aged 50); Everett, Massachusetts, US
- Occupation: harbor pilot
- Known for: 20 years in Boston Pilots' Association

John Crossland Fawcett (1859 – 7 July 1908) was a 19th-century American Boston harbor pilot. He is best known for being a member of the Boston Pilots' Association for 19 years. He was an owner and pilot on the pilot boats Columbia and Louise. He died by suicide in his cabin on the pilot boat Louise in 1908 off Half Way Rock.

== Early life ==
John C. Fawcett was born in England in 1859.

== Career ==
=== Columbia ===
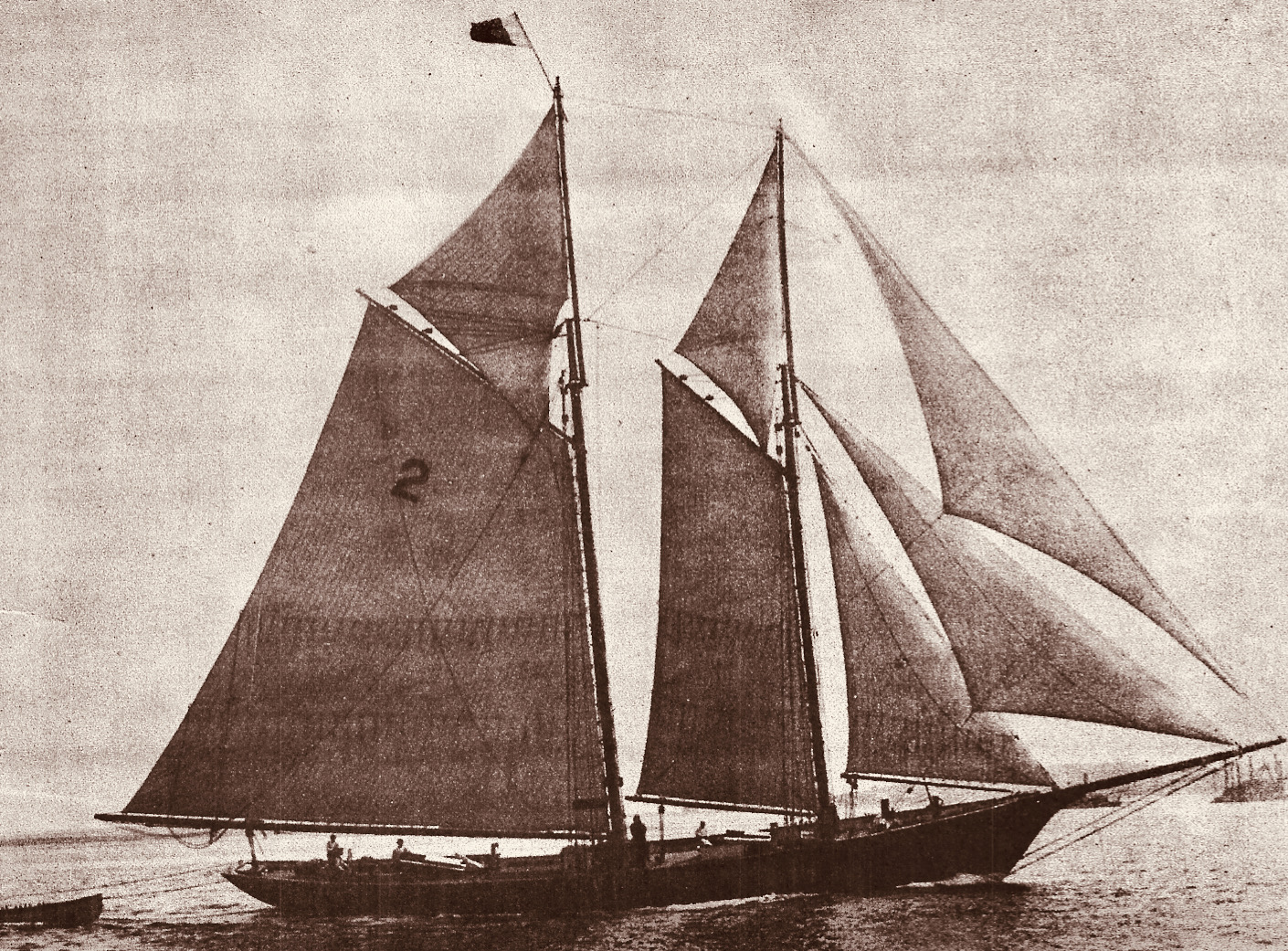
Columbia pilot boat.

The Boston pilot boat Columbia was built in 1894 for John Fawcett, Joseph Fawcett, Captain Thomas Cooper and E. G. Martin to replace the pilot-boat Friend, No. 7. On November 26, 1898, while returning to Boston from the outer station, after putting John Fawcett, Joseph Fawcett, Thomas Cooper, William Abbott and Axel Olsen aboard incoming vessels, the Columbia was driven ashore at the Sand Hills beach in Scituate in the great Portland Gale with the loss of all five men aboard. When access to the beach became available, Captain John and Joseph Fawcett arrived at the scene to witness the destruction of their boat.

=== Louise ===
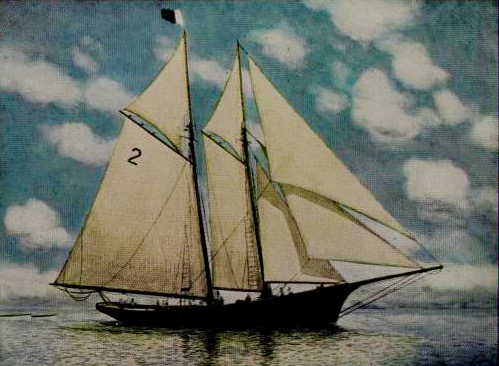
Louise pilot boat.

The Louise, No. 2, replaced the ill-fated Columbia. John Fawcett was an owner and pilot on the Louise, along with pilots, Watson S. Dolliver, William V. Abbott, Joseph Fawcett, were the assigned to the Louise. The Louise was christened by Louise Fawcett, daughter of John C. Fawcett. Her portrait was on the wall of the pilot's cabin.

On October 17, 1900, Dolliver was on the Louise when he boarded the Cunard Line steamship Saxonia, with two pilots, Erick Ahlquist and William Weaver. On return to the pilot boat, the two pilots almost drowned when a wave filled the yawl with water and overturned it. The steamer was able to rescue the men and take them on board the Saxonia. Pilots John C. Fawcett, Joseph Fawcett, William V. Abbott and Watson S. Dolliver sent a letter, that was posted in the Boston Globe, thanking Captain Pritchard and his officers and crew of the Saxonia for their heroic and successful efforts.

On March 28, 1904, Fawcett was taken on board the British White Star Line SS Cretic to bring the ship to the dock at Charlestown, Boston, without touching the Boston Navy Yard side, which was a difficult feat.

Fawcett was in poor health and suffered from locomotor ataxia and depression.

== Death ==
On July 7, 1908, Fawcett, age 49, of Everett, Massachusetts, committed suicide in his cabin on the pilot boat Louise near Half Way Rock, in Marblehead, Massachusetts. The flags were lowered to half-mast at the pilots' office at Lewis Wharf and at the Boston Towboat Company. He was survived by his wife and four children. Funeral services were held at the family home in Everett. Rev. R. W. Davis conducted the services.

== See also ==
- List of Northeastern U. S. Pilot Boats
