= Joseph F. Loubat =

Sandy Hook Pilot boat

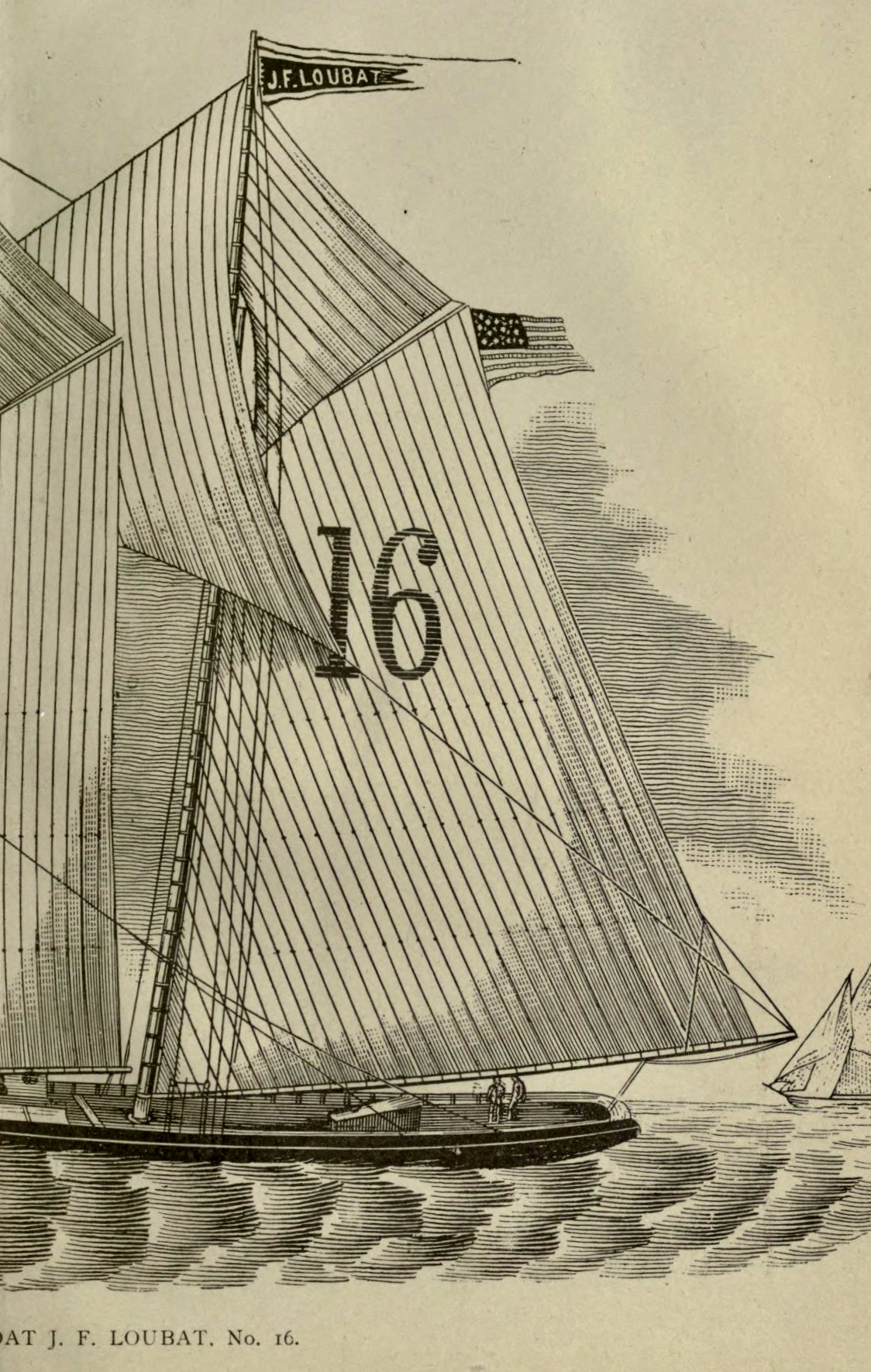
- The New York Pilot Boat Joseph F. Loubat No. 16.

History

United States
- Name: Joseph F. Loubat
- Namesake: Joseph Florimond Loubat, yachtsman and author
- Owner: N. Y. Pilots: Electus Comfort, William J. Barry, James McCarthy, and Maurice J. Mariga
- Builder: Jacob S. Ellis's shipyard in Tottenville, Staten Island
- Cost: $13,000
- Launched: 18 December 1880
- Out of service: 1 February 1896
- Fate: Sold

General characteristics
- Class & type: schooner
- Tonnage: 150 Thames Measurement
- Length: 88 ft 0 in (26.82 m)
- Beam: 21 ft 0 in (6.40 m)
- Draft: 10 ft 0 in (3.05 m)
- Depth: 9 ft 0 in (2.74 m)
- Propulsion: Sail
- Sail plan: 75 ft 6 in (23.01 m)
- Notes: Her cabins and state rooms were finished with hardwood

The Joseph F. Loubat was a 19th-century Sandy Hook pilot boat built in 1880 at the Jacob S. Ellis shipyard in Tottenville, Staten Island. She was the largest of the pilot-boats in the Sandy Hook service. In 1896 she was one of the last pilot-boats that were sold in an age of steam and electricity.

== Construction and service ==
On Saturday, December 18, 1880, the Joseph F. Loubat was launched from the Jacob S. Ellis's shipyard in Tottenville, Staten Island. A large number of pilots and their families came to the shipyard to observe the launch of the new pilot-boat.

She was built by Jacob S. Ellis at an expense of $13,000, for co-ownership with Electus Comfort, W. J. Barry, James McCarthy, and Maurice J. Mariga. Her length was 88 feet, breadth of beam 21 feet, depth of hold is 9 feet and 150 tones. The name of the boat was chosen for Joseph Florimond Loubat, who was a yachtsman and author of one of the earliest American yachting memoir: A Yachtsman’s Scrap Book, or the Ups and Downs of Yacht Racing. Captain Electus Comfort was master of the boat. The Joseph F. Loubat was registered with the Record of American and Foreign Shipping from 1882 to 1888.

== Boat accidents ==
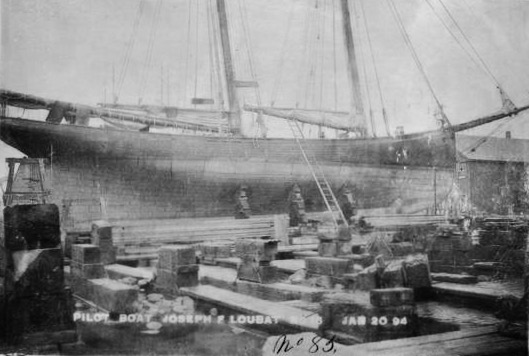
Joseph F. Loubat, hauled out, after running ashore in fog off Amagansett, NY, January 1, 1894.

On April 27, 1888, the Ward Line steamer Santiago, hit the Loubat, pilot-boat when she was at anchor at the Sandy Hook bar. Captain, Frank P. Van Pelt and other pilots were rescued from the boat.

Another accident occurred on January 1, 1894, when the Loubat, went ashore two miles east of the Amagansett Life Saving Station. The crew on the pilot-boat were saved by the men from the lifesaving station. The four pilots on board were C. J. Madigan, Thomas Shields, William Ferrie, and Frank P. Van Pelt.

== Out of service ==
On February 1, 1896, the New York Pilots discarded the Loubat, along with fifteen other sailboats and moved them to the Erie Basin in Brooklyn. They were replaced with new up-to-date steam pilot-boats. The Joseph F. Loubat, was sold cheap for $4,000. Other pilot boats that were sold were the William H. Starbuck, Richard K. Fox, and the Edmund Blunt.

== See also ==
- List of Northeastern U. S. Pilot Boats
