= Ezra Nye =

New York Pilot boat

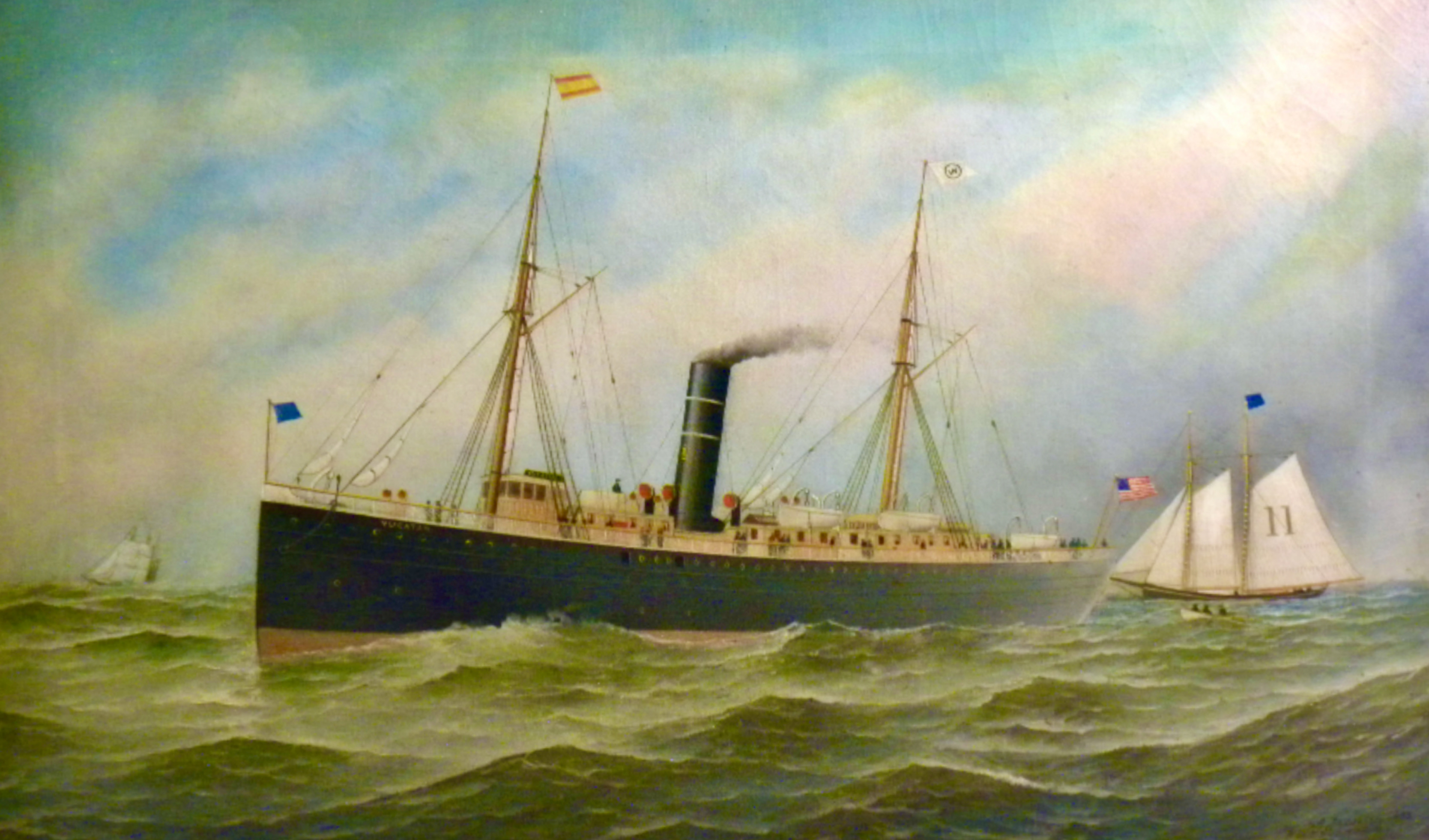
- Yucatan and pilot boat Ezra Nye, No. 11, by Antonio Jacobsen.

History

United States
- Name: Ezra Nye
- Namesake: Ezra Nye, steamship captain of the Collins Line, SS Pacific (1849)
- Owner: New Jersey Pilots
- Operator: J. T. Watson; Benjamin J. Guinness
- Builder: Wells & Webb
- Launched: 8 March 1859
- Christened: 8 March 1859
- Out of service: 1 February 1896
- Fate: Sold

General characteristics
- Class & type: schooner
- Tonnage: 44-tons TM
- Length: 70 ft 5 in (21.46 m)
- Beam: 19 ft 5 in (5.92 m)
- Draft: 9 ft 0 in (2.74 m)
- Depth: 7 ft 5 in (2.26 m)
- Propulsion: Sail

The Ezra Nye was a 19th-century pilot boat, built in 1859 by the Wells & Webb shipyard in Greenpoint, Brooklyn for a group of New Jersey and Sandy Hook Pilots. She was one of the pilot-boats that was in the Great Blizzard of 1888, that was one of the most severe blizzards in American history. In 1896, in the age of steam, the Ezra Nye along with other pilot boats, were replaced with steamboats.

== Construction and service ==
The new pilot boat Ezra Nye was launched on 8 March 1859 from Wells & Webb shipyard in Greenpoint, Brooklyn. Ezra Nye, was the name of a steamship captain of the Collins Line, SS Pacific (1849), who died in 1866 of Newark, New Jersey. She was known as pilot-boat Ezra Nye No, 2, for the New Jersey Pilots' Association.

The Ezra Nye was registered as a New Jersey Pilot Schooner with the Record of American and Foreign Shipping, from 1861 to 1885. She was 70.5 ft. in length, 19.5 ft. breadth of beam, 7.5 ft. depth, 9 ft. draft, and 44-tons. J. T. Watson and Benjamin J. Guinness were the ship masters. She was registered as owned by the New Jersey Pilots.

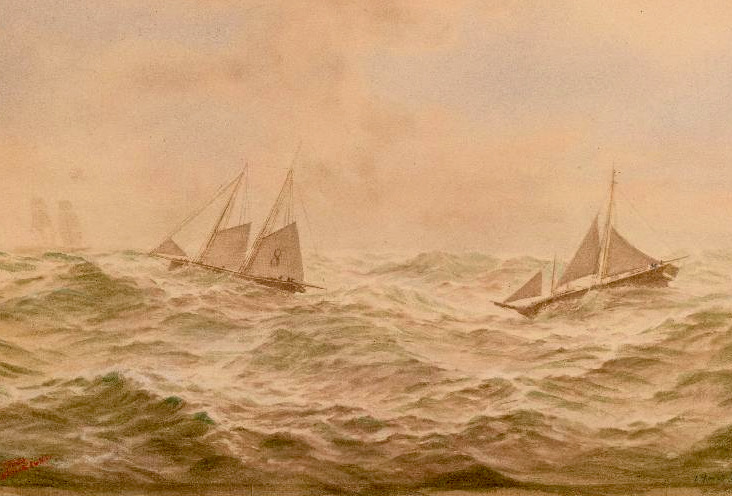
Painting of Pilot boat Ezra Nye (1862) towing a disabled schooner into Newport, Rhode Island, by Conrad Freitag.

On March 12, 1888, in the Great Blizzard of 1888, the New Jersey pilot-boat Ezra Nye, along with other pilot-boats, was caught up in one of the most severe blizzards in American history. She left Tompkinsville bound for a cruise. She stayed close to Sandy Hook, but when the storm hit the pilots decided to sail through the Narrows to the Bay Ridge, where they thought she would be safe. However, the storm turned into a hurricane and she drifted and struck near the southern end of the Manhattan Beach Railroad pier. All her crew were able to escape to land. The pilot boat Elbridge T. Gerry was launched on August 24, 1888, to take the place of the Ezra Nye that was wrecked in the blizzard. She was salvaged and sold to the New York Sandy Hook Pilots. The boat number "11" was painted as a large number on her mainsail, that identified the boat as belonging to the New New York and Sandy Hook Pilots.

== End of service ==
On 1 February 1896, the New York Pilots discarded sixteen sailboats and moved them to the Erie Basin in Brooklyn. They were replaced with steam pilot boats. The Ezra Nye, was sold for $1,500.

On May 29, 1896, the Ezra Nye, was made into a cruising yacht and sailed to the Sorrento, Southern Italy on the Bay of Naples for the American novelist, Francis Marion Crawford. She was renamed the Alda, which is Icelandic for Ocean Wave.

== See also ==
- List of Northeastern U. S. Pilot Boats
