= Eben D. Jordan (pilot boat) =

Sandy Hook Pilot boat

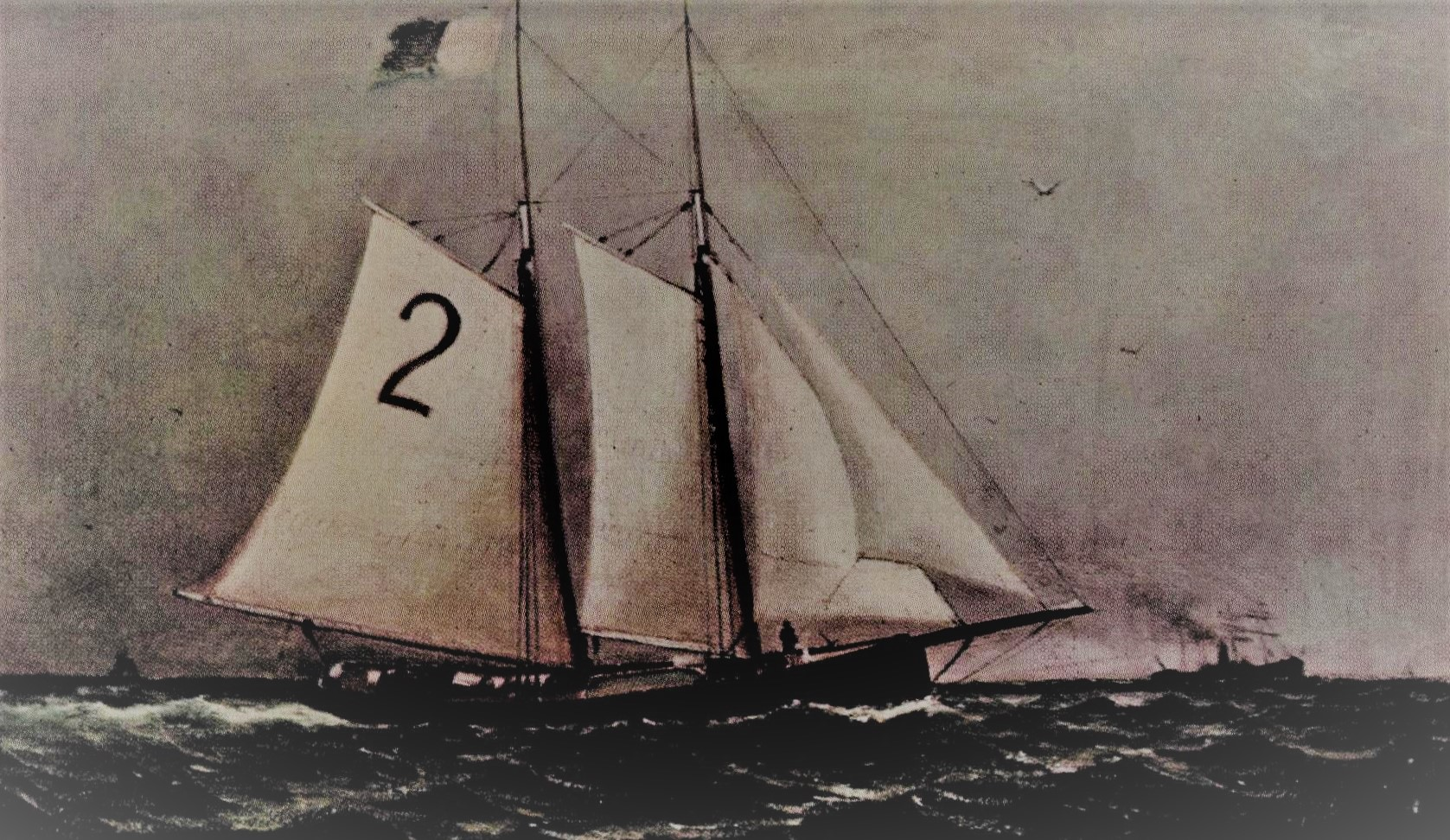
- Pilot Boat Eben D. Jordan, No. 2; painting by Hendricks A. Hallett of Boston.

History

United States
- Name: Eben D. Jordan
- Namesake: Eben Dyer Jordan
- Owner: Thomas Cooper, Gideon L. Mapes
- Operator: Thomas Cooper, John Henry Low
- Builder: Ambrose A. Martin
- Launched: 1883
- Out of service: February 1, 1896
- Fate: Sold

General characteristics
- Class & type: schooner
- Tonnage: 65-tons TM
- Length: 73 ft 2 in (22.30 m)
- Beam: 21 ft 2 in (6.45 m)
- Depth: 9 ft 8 in (2.95 m)
- Propulsion: Sail

The Eben D. Jordan was a 19th-century Boston pilot boat built in 1883 by Ambrose A. Martin in East Boston for Captain Thomas Cooper. Her namesake was Eben Dyer Jordan, the founder of the Jordan Marsh department stores. In 1892, she was sold to the New York Sandy Hook pilots. She was one of the last of the pilot-boats that were discarded in an age of steam and electricity in 1896.

== Construction and service ==
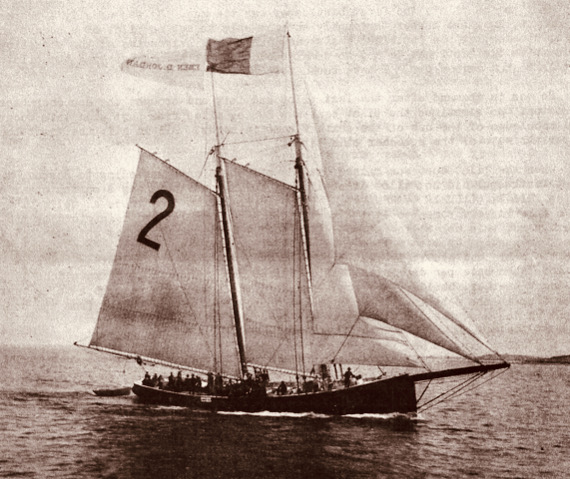
Eben D. Jordan flying a pilot flag, a flag displaying her name and boat number.

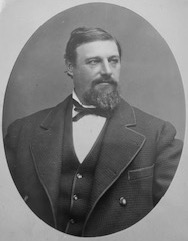
Captain Thomas Cooper.

In 1883, the Eben D. Jordan, No. 2, was built by Ambrose A. Martin in East Boston. Her lines were based on the Dennison J. Lawlor design. Her namesake was Eben Dyer Jordan, the founder of the Jordan Marsh department stores.

Eben Jordan gave Captain Thomas Cooper a set of signal flags for use on his pilot-boat. The boat was flying a blue and white pilot flag at the fore and a large white flag displaying her name along with the boat number "2" painted as a large number on her mainsail.

In the Record of American and Foreign Shipping, from 1884 to 1900, she was listed as: 65-tons; built in 1883, owned and mastered by Captain Thomas Cooper, built in East Boston, her hailing port was Boston; Length was 73.2 feet; Breadth was 21.2 feet; and Depth was 9.8 feet.

On February 24, 1886, pilot-boat Eben D. Jordan left Boston for her station. Two days later she was caught up in a heavy winter storm. She lost her main boom and staysail. She drifted to Block Island, then to Vineyard Haven, Massachusetts, and then returned safely into the Boston harbor.

In November 1888, during a heavy winter storm, the Eben D. Jordan came into the Boston harbor. Captain Reed reported seeing three boats going ashore between Freshwater Cove and Magnolia, Massachusetts.

Boston pilot Watson Shields Dolliver received his commission out of the E. D. Jordan in 1890.

=== Sold to New York pilots ===
In 1892, Cooper sold the Eben D. Jordan, to the New York Harbor pilot group led by George Washington Beebe. At that time the number on her mainsail changed from No. 2 to No. 9. Gideon L. Mapes was one of the pilots on the Jordan.

In 1893, while on station offshore off Barnegat, New Jersey, she was run down when struck by the steamship SS. Saginaw during a gale. She survived the collision, was salvaged, and placed back into service.

In February 1895, the Jordan was carried 75 miles beyond the Highlands in a winter storm. A wave of 30 feet washed over her smashing her yawl, her boom and flooding the cabin. Her trysail was carried away. She arrived at Stapleton, Staten Island in tow with the help of Pilot Andrew Jackson.

== End of service ==
On February 1, 1896, the New York Pilots discarded sixteen sailboats and moved them to the Erie Basin in Brooklyn. They were replaced with steam pilot boats. The Eben D. Jordan, was sold for $5,500.

In 1898, the Eben D. Jordan was sold to the Brunswick, Georgia pilots. The Mobile, Alabama Bar and Bay Pilots' Association acquired her in December 1906 as a replacement for the pilot-boat Louise F. Harper, which was lost in a September storm.

On April 8, 1912, the Eben D. Jordan went to Havana where she was sold to a Cuban owner.

== See also ==
- List of Northeastern U. S. Pilot Boats
