= Friend (pilot boat) =

Sandy Hook Pilot boat

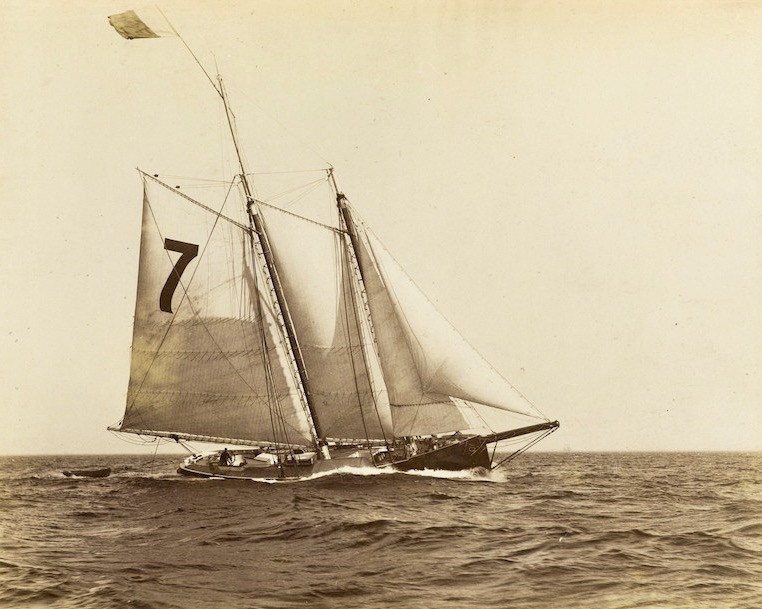
- Pilot Boat Friend No. 7; photograph by Nathaniel Stebbins, c. 1888.

History

United States
- Name: Friend
- Owner: Thomas Cooper; James Lawrence Fowler
- Operator: John Sherman (1845-1866); Franklin B. Wellock (1855); Joe Fossett (1858); William Abbott (1858); James M. Dolliver (1845-1866)
- Builder: Kelley & Holmes (1848); Dennison J. Lawlor (1887)
- Cost: $8,000 (1887)
- Launched: 1848 (1st pilot boat); November 15, 1887 (2nd pilot boat))
- Out of service: November 20, 1868 (1st pilot boat); November 1896 (2nd pilot boat))
- Fate: Sold

General characteristics
- Class & type: schooner
- Tonnage: 68 TM
- Length: 60 ft 9 in (18.52 m)
- Beam: 17 ft 9 in (5.41 m)
- Depth: 7 ft 4 in (2.24 m)
- Propulsion: Sail

The Friend was a 19th-century pilot boat built by Daniel D. Kelley & Holmes East Boston shipyard in 1848 for Boston pilots. She helped transport Boston maritime pilots between inbound or outbound ships coming into the Boston Harbor. The Friend was one of the last of the low sided, straight sheared schooners built in the 1840s for Boston pilots. The second Boston pilot boat Friend was built in 1887. Her name came from the older Friend that was in the service in the late 1840s. Captain Thomas Cooper sold the Friend to New York pilots in 1893. Cooper replaced the Friend with the pilot-boat Columbia in 1894.

== Construction and service ==
Boston pilot-boat Friend was built in January 1847 by Daniel D. Kelley of the Daniel D. Kelley & Holmes East Boston shipyard. She was launched on May 5, 1847. Her dimensions were 60.9 ft. in length; 17.9 ft. breadth of beam; 7.4 ft. depth of hold; and 68-tons Tonnage. The Friend was one of the last of the low sided, straight sheared schooners built in the 1840s for Boston pilots.

Captain John Sherman was on the Friend from 1847 to 1866. Captain William Abbott was a boat keeper on the Friend in 1858. The Friend was low sided, which made it easier to launch a yawl without hoisting it.

Franklin B. Wellock was a Boston pilot for more than 55 years. In 1855, he began his career as a pilot on the pilot-boat Friend.

James Lawrence Fowler was one of the owners of the Friend. She was sometimes hired for a pleasure cruises. She was used by Daniel Webster and his associates for outings down the Boston Harbor, where Webster made them fish chowder.

One of the pilots who served on the Friend was Captain James M. Dolliver. On February 2, 1859, Dolliver and Patrick Henry Chandler launched a yawl from the Friend to rescue the captain of the British schooner Caroline that went ashore on the rocks near the Boston Light in heavy weather approaching Boston. They received a silver medal from the Massachusetts Humane Society for their brave efforts.

Artist Alfred Waud did a marine pencil drawing of the Boston Pilot Boat Fleet in 1859, which appeared in the Ballou's Pictorial of 1859. The story in the Ballou's Pictorial said:

These boats are all well-built, of exquisite model and crack sailors, and manned by as fine a set of men as ever trod a deck or handled a sheet. They ride the waves like sea-ducks, and with their hardy crews are constantly exposed to the roughest weather.

— Ballou's Pictorial, 1859, Vol. XVI, No. 14.

The drawing lists the schooner-rigged boats with their number on the mainsail. They included the Phantom, No. 5; Syren, No. 1; William Starkey, No 6; the Coquette and the Friend, No. 7.

On March 31, 1860, one of her pilots boarded the bark St. Jago, off Cape Cod coming from Matanzas for Portland.

On January 15, 1861, Captain James M. Dolliver was on the Friend when he met up with the ship Flying Dragon, which was going from New Orleans to Boston. As Dolliver was hailing the ship, the foresail struck him throwing him into the water. He was rescued by a yawl that was lowered from the pilot boat.

The pilot boat Friend from Boston was reported as lost on the beach of Santa Rosa, Florida on November 20, 1868.

=== New pilot boat Friend ===
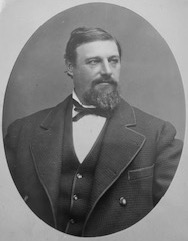
Captain Thomas Cooper.

The new pilot boat Friend was built at the Dennison J. Lawlor's shipyard on Condor street in East Boston in early 1887 for Captain William R. Lampee and Captain Thomas Cooper. She was designed by Ambrose Martin and built at a cost of $8,000. Her name comes from the older pilot boat that was in the service in the late 1840s. The Friend, No. 7, was launched on November 15, 1887. After the launch, she was taken to Fisk wharf to be fitted with masts and rigging. Her dimensions were 67 ft. length on deck; and 48.84-tons Tonnage.

The trial trip of the new pilot boat Friend, No. 7, was on January 12, 1888. Captain William R. Lampee was in command during the trip. There were a dozen friends aboard the boat during the trip down as far as the middle ground.

In May 1888, the pilot boat Friend, began her pilot service at the port of Provincetown, Massachusetts. At Provincetown, she boarded the bark Benjamin Dickerman, 12 miles from the Highland Light, headed for Portland.

After Captain Lampee died in 1892 and Cooper sold the Eben D. Jordan, Cooper became the new Captain of the Friend and used her on cruises from 1892 through 1893.

On May 15, 1893, pilot-boat Friend, with pilot Joe Fossett, picked up the two-masted schooner Modesty of Bangor, Maine, that was full of water. They were able to bring the vessel into East Boston with the help of the tugboat Piscataqua.

=== Sold to New Jersey pilots ===
On October 21, 1893, Captain Thomas Cooper sold the Friend, No. 7, to the New York Pilots. Cooper wanted a more up-to-date vessel to challenge the Hesper, Varuna, and other boats in the Boston fleet. In 1894, Cooper replaced the Friend, with the pilot-boat Columbia built by Ambrose D. Martin at East Boston for Thomas Cooper.

As a New York pilot boat, the Friend's boat number changed to No. 4. On June 5, 1894, Pilot Robert Sylvester, of the pilot-boat Friend, No. 4, was out on a cruise when he sighted George Gould's steam yacht Atlanta.

On November 16, 1895, Captain John Ashcraft of the pilot boat Friend, was reported looking for a steamboat for the now consolidated pilots' association of New York and New Jersey pilots, which was merged on December 1, 1894.

== End of service ==
On November 15, 1896, the pilot-boat Friend ended her service as a pilot boat and was altered to be a pleasure boat.

== See also ==
- List of Northeastern U. S. Pilot Boats
