= Jacob S. Ellis =

Early American shipbuilder

Jacob S Ellis
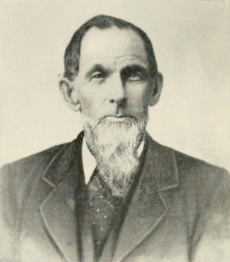
- Jacob S. Ellis
- Born: October 25, 1820; Rossville, Staten Island, New York City, US
- Died: August 28, 1902 (aged 81); Tottenville, Staten Island, US
- Occupation: Shipbuilder
- Spouse: Sarah R. Hazen
- Children: 3

Jacob Samson Ellis (October 25, 1820 – July 8, 1902), was a 19th-century shipbuilder in Tottenville, Staten Island. He had a shipyard business for over thirty years designing vessels. Ellis died in Tottenville in 1902. His son, Hampton C. Ellis, continued with the shipyard constructing boats through the 1920s.

== Career ==
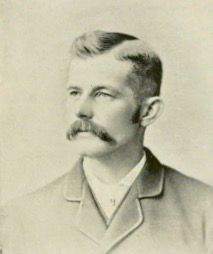
Jacob's son Hampton C. Ellis

He learned the shipbuilding trade of at Webb's shipyard in New York. In 1850, he moved to Belleville, New Jersey where he built freight schooners until 1861 when he returned to Staten Island and purchased the shipyard that became known as "J. S. Ellis & Son". He had a large successful business for over thirty years. His son, Hampton C. Ellis (1856-1928), went into partnership with his father when he was twenty-five years old and became a junior member of the firm.

It was called the Jacob S. Ellis & Son or just "J. S. Ellis" shipyard. At this shipyard, he built most of his vessels including ships, steamships, brigs and pilot boats (see list below). By 1912, the shipyard employed 18 men. The shipyard had a reputation for the designing fine vessels.

=== William H. Starbuck ===
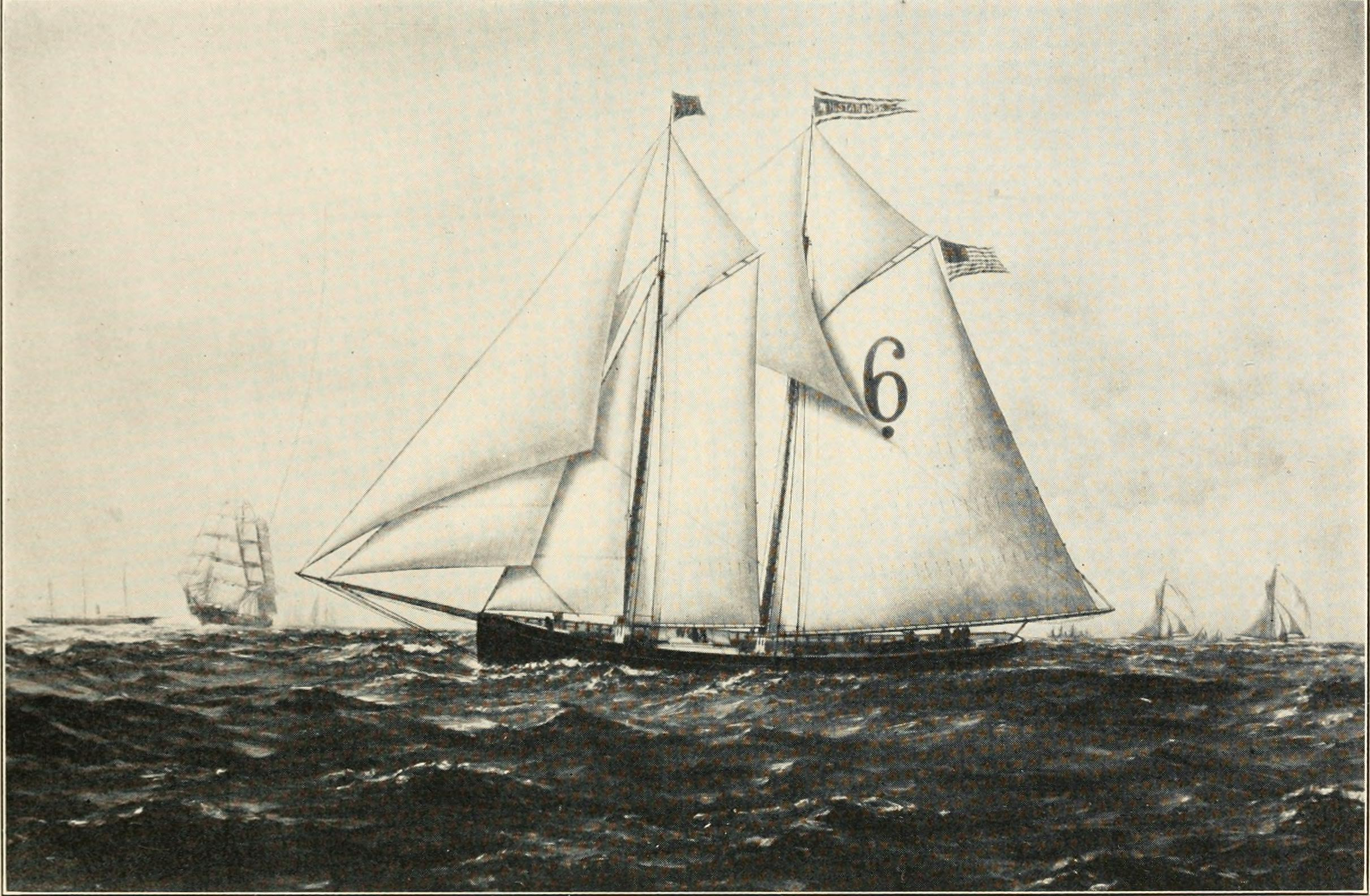
Pilot boat William H. Starbuck.

The pilot boat William H. Starbuck was launched from the J. S. Ellis & Son shipyard on May 30, 1886. About a thousand people witnessed the launching, including William H. Starbuck, Captain Josiah Johnson of the Edmund Blunt, No. 2, James Hawkins of pilot-boat No. 4, as well as others. She was named after William H. Starbuck, a railroad financier, who paid for the cabin and presented the colours, including the signal flags. The Starbuck was modelled after Hempton Ellis and her lines were drawn by Howard I. Chapelle.

=== Joseph F. Loubat ===
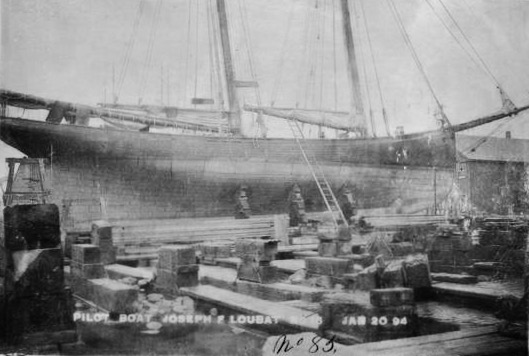
Pilot schooner Joseph F. Loubat off Amagansett, New York.

The Sandy Hook pilot boat Joseph F. Loubat (1880) was built and launched from the Jacob S. Ellis's shipyard. The Staten Island Railway brought a large number of pilots and their families to Tottenville to participate in the launch. Ellis supervised the launch. She was built at an expense of $13,000, for co-ownership with Electus Comfort, W. J. Barry, James McCarthy, and Maurice J. Mariga. Her length was 88 feet, breadth of beam 21 feet, depth of hold is 9 feet and 150 tones.

The schooner Harry Knowlton was built in 1890 by the Jacob Ellis & Son shipyard. She hit the steamboat Larchmont on February 11, 1907 near Providence, Rhode Island. After being blown ashore, the crew of the Knowlton abandoned the wrecked boat.

== Death ==
After Jacob's death, his son, Hampton C. Ellis, continued with the shipyard constructing boats through the 1920s.

== See also ==
- List of Northeastern U. S. Pilot Boats
