= Jeffries Yacht Club =

Yacht club in Boston, Massachusetts

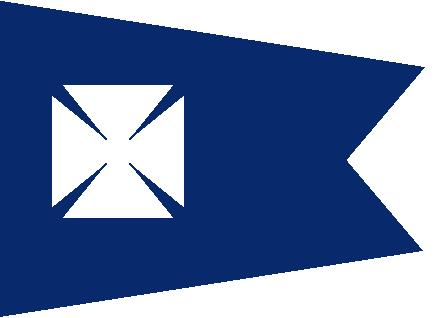
- Burgee
- Short name: GLPYC
- Founded: 1876
- Location: 565 Sumner St, Boston, Massachusetts 02128; United States
- Website: www.jeffriesyachtclub.com

The Jeffries Yacht Club is located along the Massachusetts Bay in Boston, Massachusetts. The club was chartered in 1876, is one of the older yacht clubs in the Boston area. However, the Boston Yacht Club (founded in 1866) is actually the oldest yacht club in Massachusetts as well as in New England, as documented by its incorporation charter granted by the Massachusetts State Assembly in 1866.
