= James Stafford (pilot boat) =

Sandy Hook Pilot boat

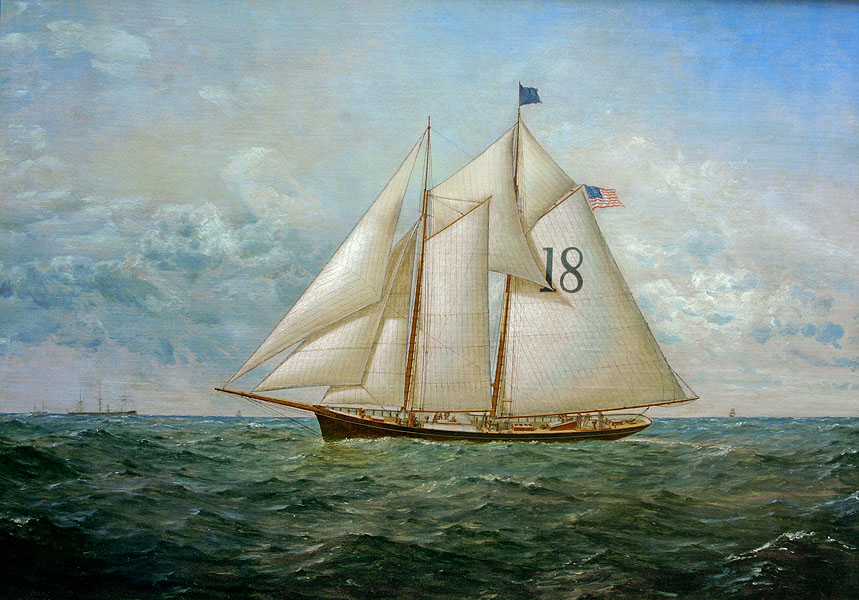
- New York Pilot-Boat No. 18, James Stafford, by Conrad Freitag, c. 1889.

History

United States
- Name: James Stafford
- Owner: Joseph Nelson, Frederick Ryerson, Charles Anderson, James Mitchell, Oscar Stoffrelden
- Launched: 3 Nov 1888
- Christened: Flora P. Stafford on 3 Nov 1888
- Out of service: 1898

General characteristics
- Class & type: schooner
- Tonnage: 56-tons TM
- Length: 81 ft 0 in (24.69 m)
- Beam: 21 ft 2 in (6.45 m)
- Depth: 9 ft 0 in (2.74 m)
- Propulsion: Sail
- Notes: Hull is black with a golden stripe

The James Stafford was a 19th-century Sandy Hook pilot boat built in 1888 for the New York Pilots. She took the place of the pilot boat Enchantress, that was lost in the Great Blizzard of 1888. She was named after James Stafford, one of the oldest and prominent shipping men of Brooklyn. She sank near Sandy Hook in 1898 when she ran into the Dry Romer shoal. At that time, the Stafford was one of the oldest pilot-boats still in service in a time when they were being replaced with steam pilot boats.

== Construction and service ==
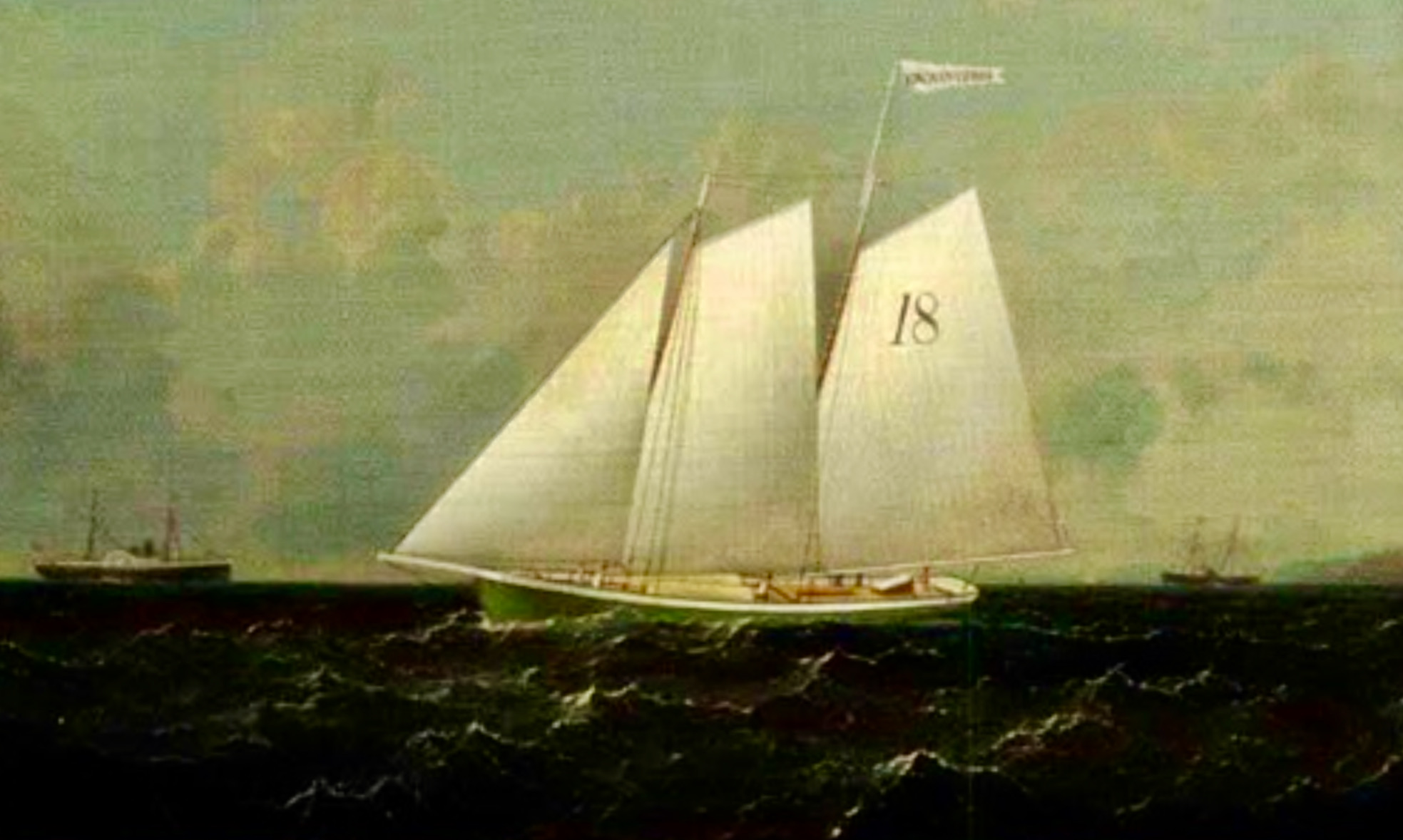
Pilot Boat Enchantress.

The New York pilot-boat James Stafford, No. 18, was launched on November 3, 1888, in Noank, Connecticut. She was christened by Flora P. Stafford, daughter of Frank Stafford of Brooklyn, New York. The boat was named after James Stafford, one of the oldest and prominent shipping men of Brooklyn. Two thousand people witnessed the launch including many prominent shipping merchants from the city.

She took a trial trip to the Sandy Hook lightship. On return, a race took place between the new boat and the pilot-boat Hope, No. 1. Afterwards, she then arrived at her berth at Pier 8 in East River, New York City. The James Stafford took the place of the Enchantress, No. 18, that was lost in the Great Blizzard of 1888. The pilot boat is ownd by Joseph Nelson, Frederick Ryerson, Charles Anderson, James Mitchell, Oscar Stoffrelden. Nelson was one of the owners of the Enchantress. The Stafford, then took a position on the pilot station at Sandy Hook.

The James Stafford was registered with the Record of American and Foreign Shipping from 1890 to 1900 to the port of New York.

On February 10, 1895, Pilot-bat Stafford, No. 18, while acting as a station boat outside Sandy Hook, was blown out to sea because of a blizzard. Pilot Gus Peterson and six crewmen were on board. She was missing for several days and arrived at Stapleton, Staten Island in tow by a tugboat. She was not damaged in the storm.

On February 1, 1896, the New York Pilots discarded James Stafford, along with other pilot-boats and moved them to the Erie Basin in Brooklyn. They were replaced with steam pilot boats. The James Stafford, was sold for $5,500.

== End of service ==
On February 5, 1898, the pilot-boat James Stafford, No. 18, sank near Sandy Hook when she was sailing into port in the fog after bringing in the steamship Fallodon Hall. She ran into the Dry Romer shoal, a sandy area near the Beacon, causing her to fill with water. The crew escaped in a yawl. The Stafford was one of the few pilot-boats still in service.

== See also ==
- List of Northeastern U. S. Pilot Boats
