= Frank P. Van Pelt =

President of the New York Sandy Hook Pilots' Association

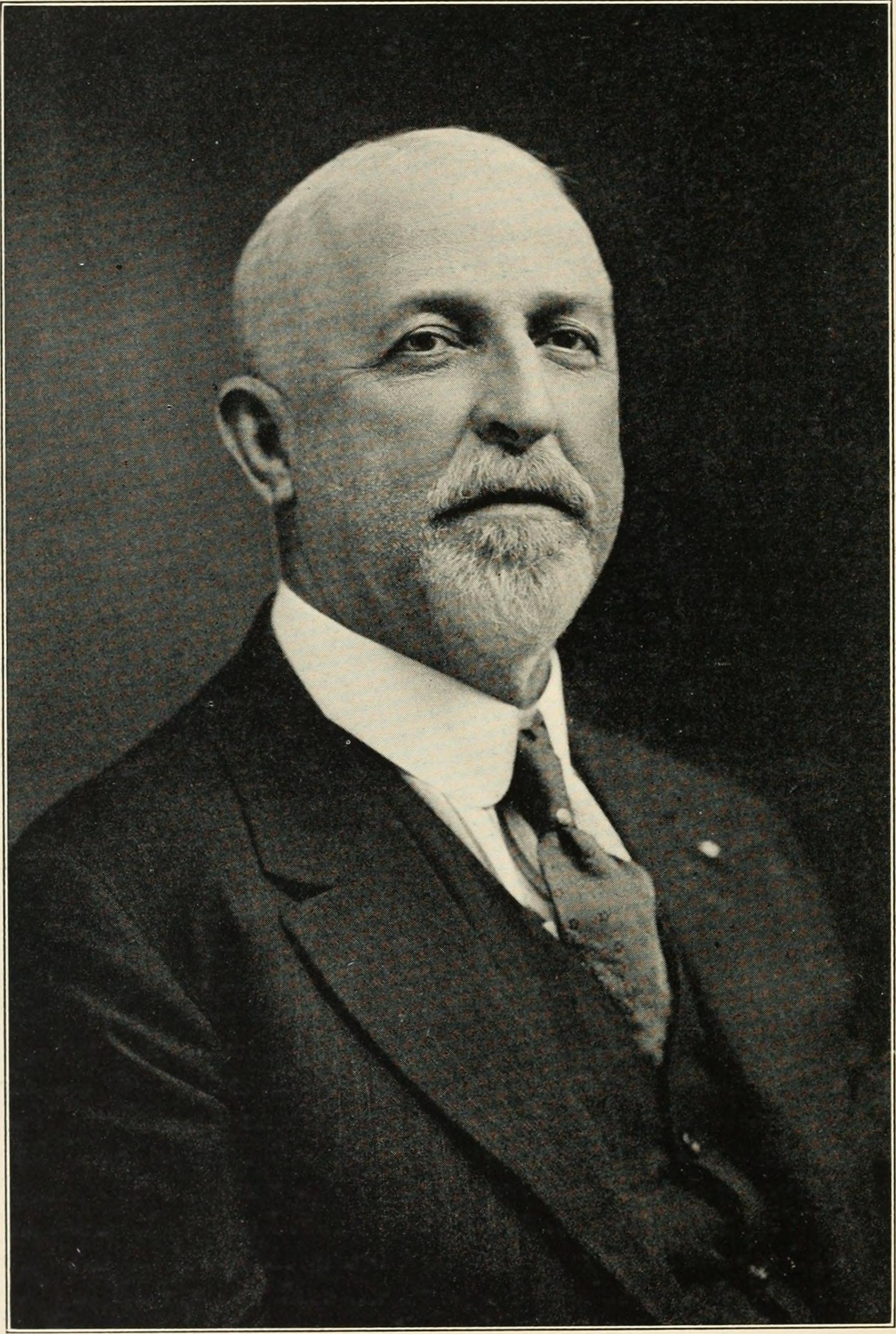
- Frank P. Van Pelt
- Born: 1861
- Died: July 20, 1942 (aged 80–81); New York City
- Occupation: harbor pilot
- Spouse(s): Annie Elizabeth Van Nostrand (1885), Clara Hanson (1819)
- Children: 2

Francis Perkins Van Pelt (1861 – July 20, 1942) was a 19th-century Sandy Hook Pilot. He is best known for being the President of the New York Sandy Hook Pilots Association and chairman of the executive committee of the New York and New Jersey Pilots' Associations. His father was Augustus Van Pelt a Sandy Hook pilot.

== Career ==
Van Pelt was the subject of a book about Sandy Hook pilots that listed him as a New York Pilot in 1922 and wrote about his experienced in a number of accidents and disasters. Van Pelt was on board the pilot boat Joseph F. Loubat, No. 16, which was struck by the Ward Line steamer Santiago on April 27, 1888. He and his brother John Van Pelt were among seven men taken off the pilot-boat by the Santiago before it sank. It was reported that as president of the New York-Sandy Hook Pilots' Association, Van Pelt was listed among 35 percent of pilots that follow in the footsteps of their fathers.

On September 19, 1915, his cousin, James H. Van Pelt, a Sandy Hook Pilot, died while boarding a Standard Oil tanker outside Sandy Hook.

On June 19, 1935, when Van Pelt retired, he received the Grand Lodge fifty-year medal as a member of Tompkins Lodge at the Masonic Temple in Stapleton, Staten Island.

== Death ==
Frank Van Pelt died on July 20, 1942, at age 81, in Staten Island, New York City. He was buried at the Moravian Cemetery in New Dorp, Staten Island.

== See also ==
- List of pilot boats and pilots.
