= Edward F. Williams (pilot boat) =

New York Pilot boat

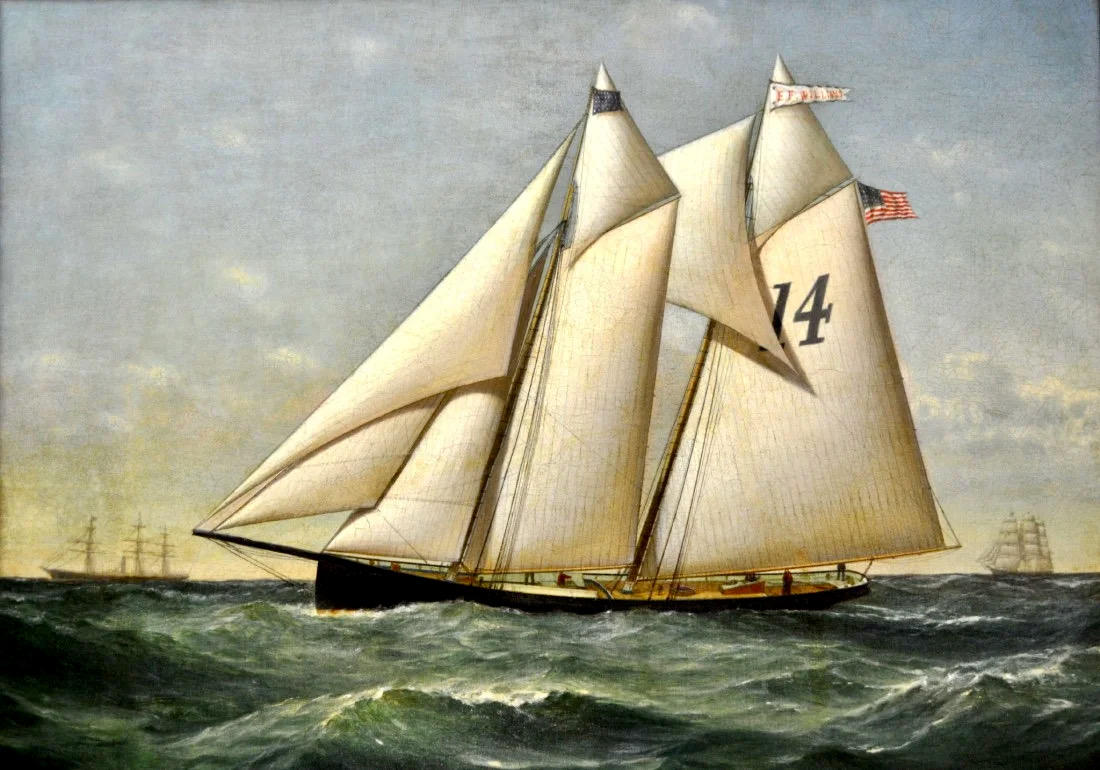
- New York pilot boat Edward F. Williams, No. 14. by Conrad Freitag.

History

United States
- Name: Edward F. Williams
- Namesake: Edward F. Williams, shipbuilder
- Owner: New York Pilots' Association
- Operator: George H. Berry
- Builder: Edward F. Williams shipyard
- Launched: April 28, 1863
- Out of service: 1 February 1896
- Fate: Sold

General characteristics
- Class & type: schooner
- Tonnage: 50-tons TM
- Length: 76 ft 0 in (23.16 m)
- Beam: 21 ft 0 in (6.40 m)
- Depth: 7 ft 0 in (2.13 m)
- Propulsion: Sail

The Edward F. Williams was a 19th-century Sandy Hook pilot boat, built in 1863 at the Edward F. Williams shipyard in Greenpoint, Brooklyn for a group of New York Pilots. She survived the Great Blizzard of 1888. In the age of steam, the Williams was sold in 1896.

== Construction and service ==
New York pilot-boat Edward F. Williams No. 14 was built 1863 at the Edward F. Williams shipyard in Greenpoint, Brooklyn. The boat number "14" was painted as a large number on her mainsail, that identified the boat as belonging to the Sandy Hook Pilots. She was launched on April 28, 1863, from the Edward F. Williams yard for the Sandy Hook pilots. She was built for company of pilots that owned the Forrest, No. 14, which was wrecked on Long Island in 1862.

The Edward F. Williams was registered with the Record of American and Foreign Shipping from 1877 to 1900, as a Pilot Schooner, with the New York Pilots as owners and Geo. H. Berry as the Master. She was 76 in length, 21 in breadth of beam, 7 in depth of hold, 50-tons and built in 1863.

In the March Great Blizzard of 1888, Pilot Boat Edward F. Williams No. 14, was one of 17 vessels out on pilot duty at the time of the storm. She went ashore in the Sandy Hook horseshoe along with Edmund Blunt and W. W. Story. Pilot Marshal P. White was in command at the time of the storm and was able to seek shelter inside Sandy Hook. The anchors did not hold and she was dragged towards the shore where she hit sand, that caused her keel to break off. She then started to leak and sank. Eleven men aboard had to escape in two small boats. The Williams was raised, repaired and served 12 more years as a pilot schooner.

In 1901 she went to the West Indies as a trading vessel. On December 3, 1913, after 52 years, she was wrecked at Galveston harbor.

In the summer of 1888, author and New York newspaper editor Charles Edward Russell talked about being on the pilot boat Edward F. Williams and racing with the pilot boat Jesse Carll, No. 10. When they saw a streamliner that needed a pilot, they raced to see which pilot boat could reacher her first. The pilots from both boats took yawls and rowed them to the steamer to reach the ladder. As both yawls came to the ladder, pilot Moller from the Williams went up the side of the steamer to salute the captain.

On September 9, 1891, the Red Star Line Westland that was hit by a cyclone three hundred miles east of Sandy Hook, was helping the pilot boat Washington, No. 22, that was in tow by the pilot boat, Edward F. Williams, No. 24. The Westland threw her a hawser, which was attached to the Washington's bow. The Westland tried to tow her to port, but the strain on the chain was too great so she dropped it. The pilot Robert Sylvester of the pilot boat David Carll, No. 4, brought in the Westland. The Washington was able to arrive safely back into port with damages to her masts.

== End of service ==
In the age of steam, the E. F. Williams and four other pilot-boats were retained temporarily. On 1 February 1896, the New York Pilots discarded sixteen sailboats and moved them to the Erie Basin in Brooklyn. They were replaced with steam pilot boats. The Edward F. Williams was sold for $4,000.

== See also ==
- List of Northeastern U. S. Pilot Boats
