= Fannie (pilot boat) =

Sandy Hook pilot boat

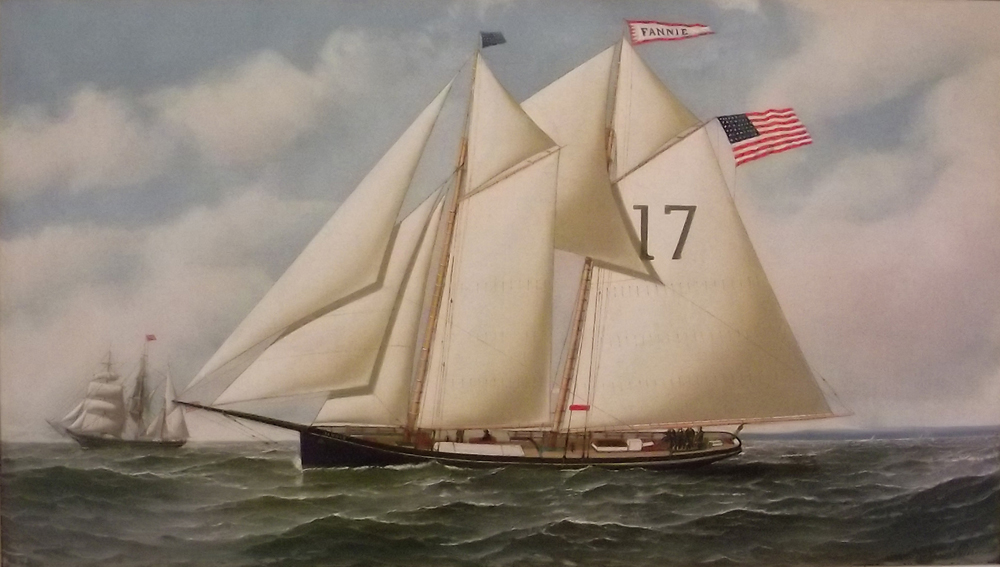
- New York Pilot Boat Fannie, No. 17 in the collection at The Mariners' Museum.

History

United States
- Name: Fannie
- Owner: N. Y. Pilots: Edward Mersenee
- Operator: C. H. Wolsey, William L. Wilson
- Builder: Edward F. Williams
- Cost: $4,000
- Launched: 1860
- Out of service: 1896
- Fate: Sold

General characteristics
- Class & type: schooner
- Tonnage: 51-tons TM
- Length: 76 ft 1 in (23.19 m)
- Beam: 19 ft 0 in (5.79 m)
- Draft: 9 ft 0 in (2.74 m)
- Depth: 8 ft 1 in (2.46 m)
- Propulsion: Sail

The Fannie was a 19th-century Sandy Hook pilot boat built in 1860 by Edward F. Williams at his shipyard in Greenpoint, Brooklyn for New York City pilots. She was in the pilot service during the American Civil War. In an age of steam, she was sold in 1896.

== Construction and service ==
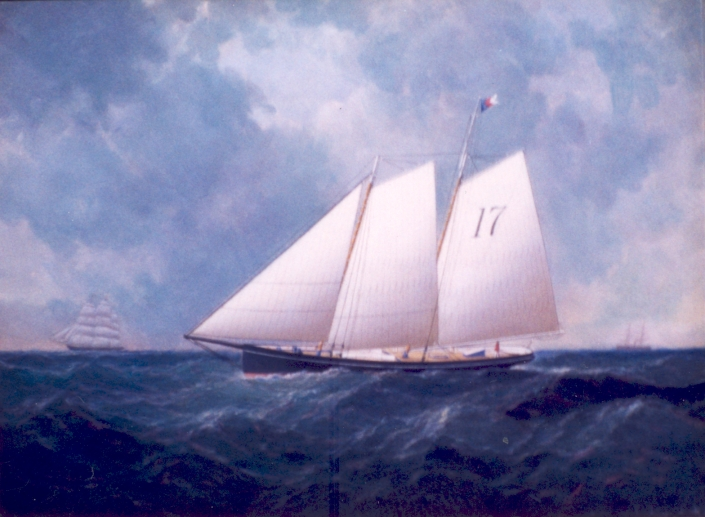
New York Pilot Schooner Fannie, No. 17, painting by Conrad Freitag.

The pilot-boat Fannie, was built in 1860 and launched on July 12, 1860, at the Edward F. Williams shipyard, in Greenpoint, Brooklyn, for the New York and Sandy Hook Pilots. She was owned by Captain Edward Mersenee of New York.

When Captain Edward Mersenee died in January 1864, the pilot boats in the port of New York flew their flags at half-mast, as a token of respect to the late captain.

On August 11, 1864, during the American Civil War, the pilots on the Fannie, No. 17 reported that they saw a vessel burning off Montauk, New York. The pilots believed that the CSS Tallahassee was working her way toward the Nantucket Shoals in the Atlantic Ocean.

The Fannie was registered with the Record of American and Foreign Shipping from 1877 to 1885 to Captain C. H. Wolsey as Master and to the New York Pilots as owners. She belonged to the port of New York. John Hobbs was captain and half owner of the pilot-boat Fannie, No. 17. She was one of only twenty-one New York pilot-boats in 1860.

On October 13, 1869, the pilot-boat Fannie, No. 17, was out at sea and reported a sunken brig laying south of the Highlands, New Jersey. Captain Wolsey was in command and reported that the brig is in the path of inward and outward bound vessels.

On March 27, 1872, pilot-boat Fannie, No. 17 came across the schooner Franklin, which had been in bad weather for twenty four days, coming from Boston. Captain Wolsey of the Fannie was able to tow her safely into the New York harbor.

On November 25, 1881, the pilot-boat Fannie, No. 17, picked up the Barque Aberdeen, out at sea and had the tugboat Walcott tow her to Staten Island. The tugboat got $250 for efforts and the pilots got $4,000.

On July 26, 1893, the pilot-boat Fannie, ran into the side of the fruit steamship Banan, causing the pilot-boat's main rigging to be torn and twisted. The Fannie asked for $100 in damages.

On April 13, 1894, Pilot Henry A. DeVere was lost while boarding the Norwegian steamer Banan from the pilot-boat Fannie, No. 17, while off Cape May. The weather was bad with gales and high seas, which capsized a yawl with DeVere and two other men. DeVere had been a pilot for ten years. His father had been a pilot for thirty years.

== End of service ==
On February 1, 1896, the New York Pilots discarded sixteen sailboats and moved them to the Erie Basin in Brooklyn. They were replaced with steam pilot-boats. The Fannie, was sold for $4,000.

== See also ==
- List of Northeastern U. S. Pilot Boats
