= Edmund Driggs (pilot boat) =

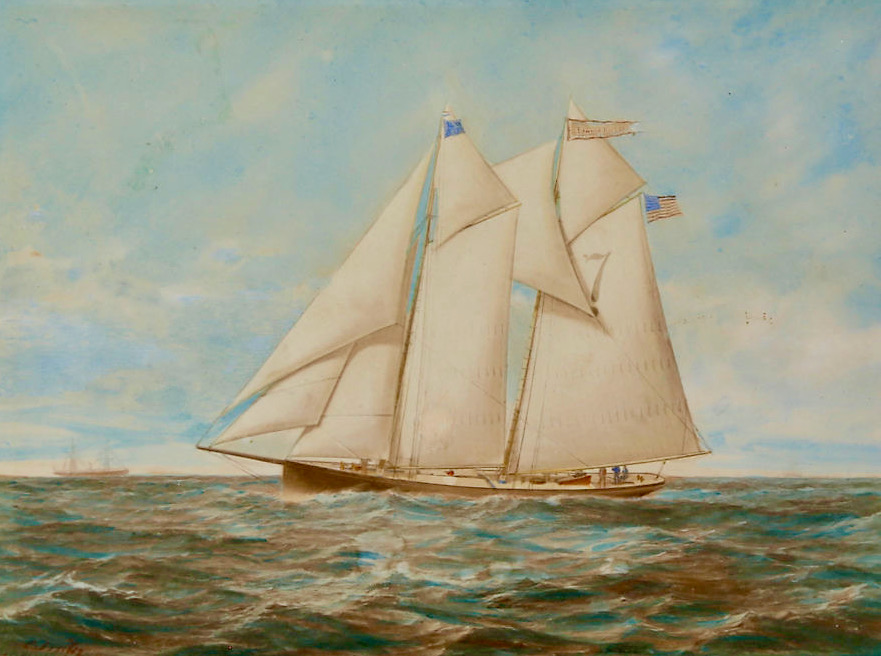
- Pilot boat Edmund Driggs, painting by Conrad Freitag.

History

United States
- Name: Edmund Driggs
- Namesake: Edmund Smith Driggs
- Owner: New York Pilots
- Operator: A. Bourne, Richard Bowen, James H. Tenure, Jacob Vanderbilt, Edward Hilliker, John W. Murray, Captain Augustus H. Van Pelt
- Route: New York Harbor
- Builder: Edward F. Williams
- Launched: February 27, 1864
- In service: March 5, 1864
- Out of service: February 1, 1896
- Fate: Sold

General characteristics
- Tonnage: 42-tons TM
- Length: 69 ft 9 in (21.26 m)
- Beam: 18 ft 6 in (5.64 m)
- Depth: 7 ft 6 in (2.29 m)
- Propulsion: schooner sail
- Sail plan: Schooner-rigged
- Complement: not known

The Edmund Driggs was a 19th-century Sandy Hook pilot boat built in 1864 at the Edward F. Williams shipyard in Greenpoint, Brooklyn. She was built to replace the pilot boat Elwood Walter. The schooner was used to pilot vessels to and from the Port of New York. She survived the Great Blizzard of 1888. In the age of steam, she was sold in 1896.

== Construction and service ==
On February 27, 1864, pilot boat Edmund Driggs, No. 7 was launched from the Edward F. Williams shipyard in Greenpoint, Brooklyn as the replacement for the Elwood Walter No. 7. The new pilot boat took her trial trip on March 5, 1864, with Captain Augustus H. Van Pelt in command. He took her down the New York harbor to the Sandy Hook Lightship and back. There were a large number of guests and pilots on board. She was assigned to the following pilots: Richard Bowen, James H. Tenure, Jacob Vanderbilt, Edward Hilliker, John W. Murray, and Captain Augustus H. Van Pelt. The Edmund Driggs was named for Edmund Smith Driggs (1809–1889) an old Williamsburg, Brooklyn resident and president of the village of Williamsburg in 1850. Captain William M. Qualey, was also attached to the Edmund Driggs for many years.

The Edmund Driggs was registered as a pilot Schooner with the Record of American and Foreign Shipping from 1876 to 1900. Her ship master was Captain A. Bourne; her owners were N. Y. Pilots; built in 1864 at New York; and her hailing port was the Port of New York. Her dimensions were 69.9 ft. in length; 18.6 ft. breadth of beam; 7.6 ft. depth of hold; and 42-tons Tonnage.

The Edmund Driggs, No. 7 went ashore near the Upper Bay, in the Great Blizzard of 1888 but survived the storm with no casualties.

On March 27, 1889, the Edmund Driggs brought into Cape May a life boat and wreckage from the gunboat Conserva, which was lost at sea near the coast of Maryland.

On July 27, 1894, a pilot on the Edmund Driggs, No. 7 boarded the French man-of-war Huzzard outside the Sandy Hook bar in New Jersey. She was flying at her bow the blue peter flag, signifying that she wanted a pilot.

== End of service ==
On February 1, 1896, in the age of steam and electricity, the New York Pilots discarded sixteen sailboats and moved them to the Erie Basin in Brooklyn. They were replaced with steam pilot boats. The Edmund Driggs was sold for $3,500.

== See also ==
- List of Northeastern U. S. Pilot Boats
