= Jacob A. Westervelt (pilot boat) =

New York Pilot boat

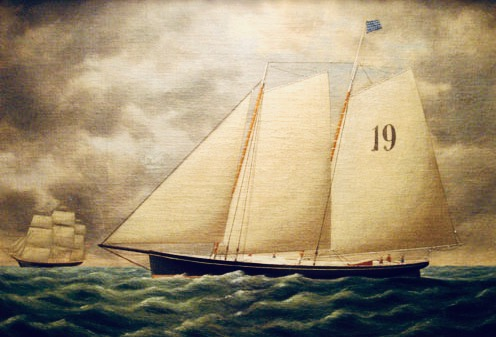
- Pilot Boat Jacob A. Westervelt, No. 19.

History

United States
- Name: Jacob A. Westervelt
- Namesake: Jacob Aaron Westervelt, shipbuilder
- Owner: New York pilots
- Operator: John O'Keefe
- Builder: Daniel Westervelt of New York City
- Cost: $8,000
- Launched: February 4, 1854
- Completed: December 1853
- Out of service: 20 April 1858
- Homeport: New York
- Fate: Sank

General characteristics
- Class & type: Schooner
- Displacement: 100 tons TM
- Length: 87 ft 0 in (26.52 m)
- Propulsion: sails
- Sail plan: Schooner-rigged

Jacob A. Westervelt was a 19th-century Sandy Hook pilot boat designed by naval architect John W. Griffiths and built by Jacob A. Westervelt in 1853. She was one of the fastest pilot-boats in the fleet. In 1858, while attempting to board the British steamer Saxonia she was fatally run into and sank outside of Sandy Hook. The Edmund Blunt, was built to replace her.

== Construction and service ==
The pilot-boat, Jacob A. Westervelt, No. 19, was designed by John W. Griffiths, who wrote a Treatise on Marine and Naval Architecture. In the Westervelt, Griffiths cut out the traditional drag of the keel, that produced a fast shoal-draught boat. She was built in December 1853 by Aaron J. Westervelt, of the Jacob A. Westervelt Sons & Company for Sullivan & Pratt and the New York pilots: John O'Keefe, John E. Johnson, Charles L. McCummisky, Peter McEnany, Eugene Sullivan, Daniel Baker and William Smith. She was launched on February 4, 1854, for a company of New York Pilots.

On May 26, 1857, John L. Roff, boatkeeper on the Jacob A. Westervelt, No. 9, picked up a drowned man at Coney Island and brought the body to the Brooklyn Coroner.

== Out of service ==
The Westervelt spotted the British screw steamer Saxonia on Tuesday morning, April 20, 1858, 270 miles east of Sandy Hook. While attempting to board her, the Westervelt was struck by the steamer. The men on the Westervelt were able to climb the robes thrown over the steamer's bow. Her captain, John O'Keefe, went missing and later reported as drowned. The pilots on board the Westervelt were: John E. Johnson, John Wright, John Hines, Charles L. McCummisky, and Peter McEnany. On, April 21, 1858, Maurice O'Keefe placed an ad giving a reward to any person recovering the body of her husband, John O'Keefe.

New York pilot-boat Edmund Blunt, No. 2, was launched on 18 August 1858, by Edward F. Williams to replace the Jacob L. Westervelt, that was run down by the steamship.

== See also ==
- Pilot boats
- List of Northeastern U. S. Pilot Boats
