= William H. Bateman =

Sandy Hook Pilot boat

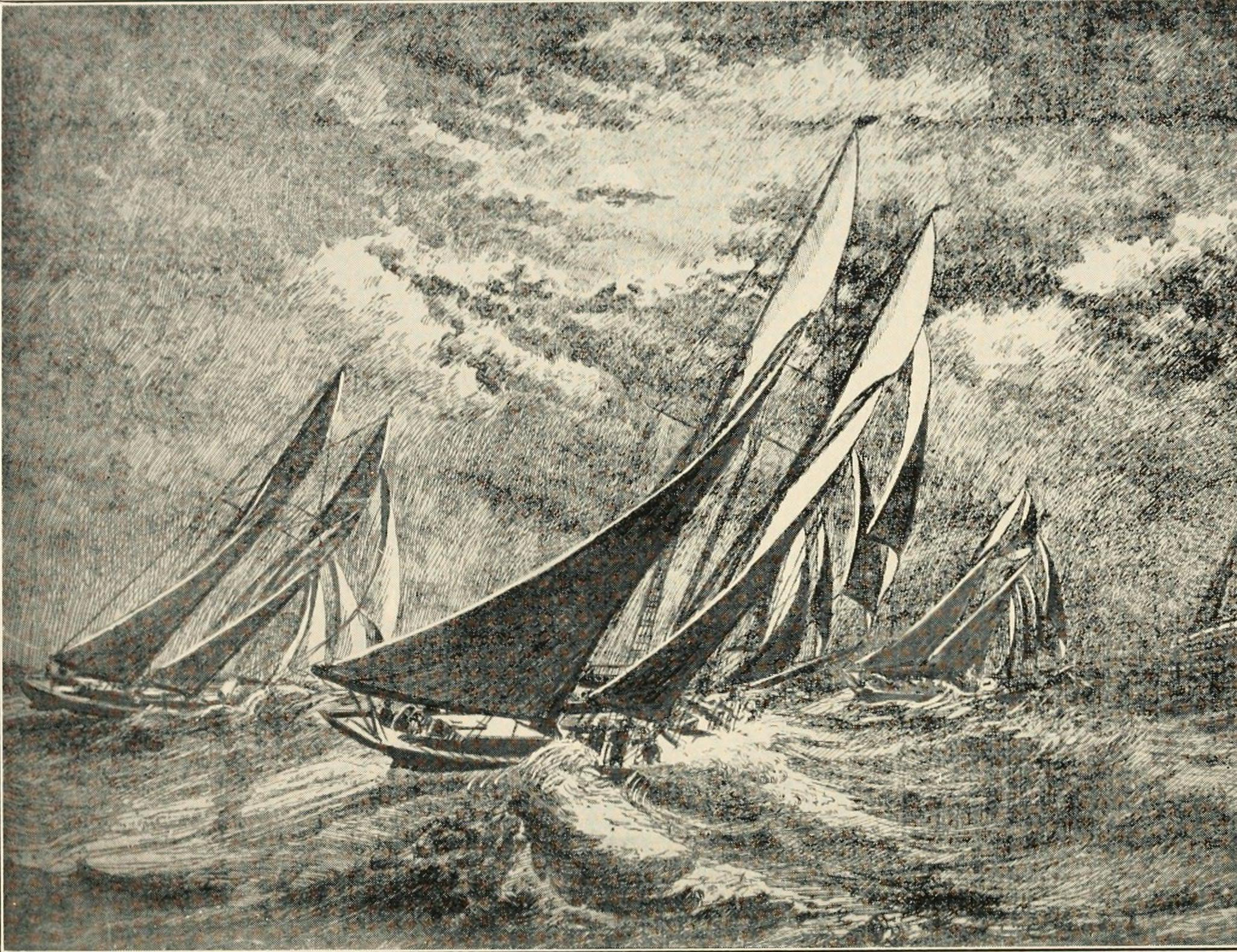
- Pilot boats Williams, Bateman, and Blunt racing for SS Rhein on May Day.

History

United States
- Name: William H. Bateman
- Namesake: Commodore William H. Bateman
- Owner: John Handran
- Operator: John Phelan
- Builder: C. & R. Poillon shipyard
- Cost: $16,000
- Launched: July 18, 1888
- Christened: July 18, 1888
- Out of service: April 13, 1889
- Fate: Sank

General characteristics
- Class & type: schooner
- Tonnage: 75-tons TM
- Length: 92 ft 0 in (28.04 m)
- Beam: 21 ft 9 in (6.63 m)
- Depth: 10 ft 0 in (3.05 m)
- Propulsion: Sail

William H. Bateman, a.k.a. Commodore Bateman, was a 19th-century Sandy Hook pilot boat built in 1888 at the C. & R. Poillon shipyard in south Brooklyn. She was replaced the pilot-boat Phantom that was lost in the Great Blizzard of 1888. She was run down and sank by the Hamburg steamship Suevia in 1889.

== Construction and service ==
The pilot-boat William H. Bateman, No. 11 was launched on July 18, 1888, at the C. & R. Poillon shipyard at the foot of Clinton street, in south Brooklyn. She took the place of the ill-fated pilot-boat Phantom. Captain John Phelan was her commander and part owner, with pilots John Haurahan, Bernard Brady, Thomas F. Murphy, E. W. Turnure, and C. L. Sampson. She was christened the Commodore William H. Bateman. The christening was done by Margie Bateman, the Commodore's 7-year-old daughter, by breaking a sacrificial bottle of champagne over the bows. Captain Ambrose Snow, of the Board of Pilot Commissioners was in attendance. The boat was decked with a new set of bunting, a red and white flag with the name "Commodore Bateman" in large red letters. She was 92 feet long, 21 feet 9 inches beam, 10 feet depth of hold, and 75 tons burden.

On May Day, pilot boats Mary A. Williams, William H. Bateman, and Edmund Blunt raced and competed for honors to reach several ocean liners coming into port off Sandy Hook. The North German Lloyd steamship, Rhein was in reach. The racing pilot boats raced to her side. The Bateman won the race by less than a dozen yards.

== End of service ==
On April 13, 1889, during a dense fog, the Hamburg Line steamship Suevia ran into the pilot-boat Commodore Bateman, No. 11 and sank her off Georges Bank, Cape Cod. Pilot John Handran and the cook Henry Halford were drowned trying to escape the sinking boat. Others on the pilot-boat were saved and taken on board the Suevia. John Handran's son James Handran was lost on the Phantom. The Bateman's original cost was $16,000.

== See also ==
- List of Northeastern U. S. Pilot Boats
