= W. W. Story (pilot boat) =

New Jersey Pilot boat

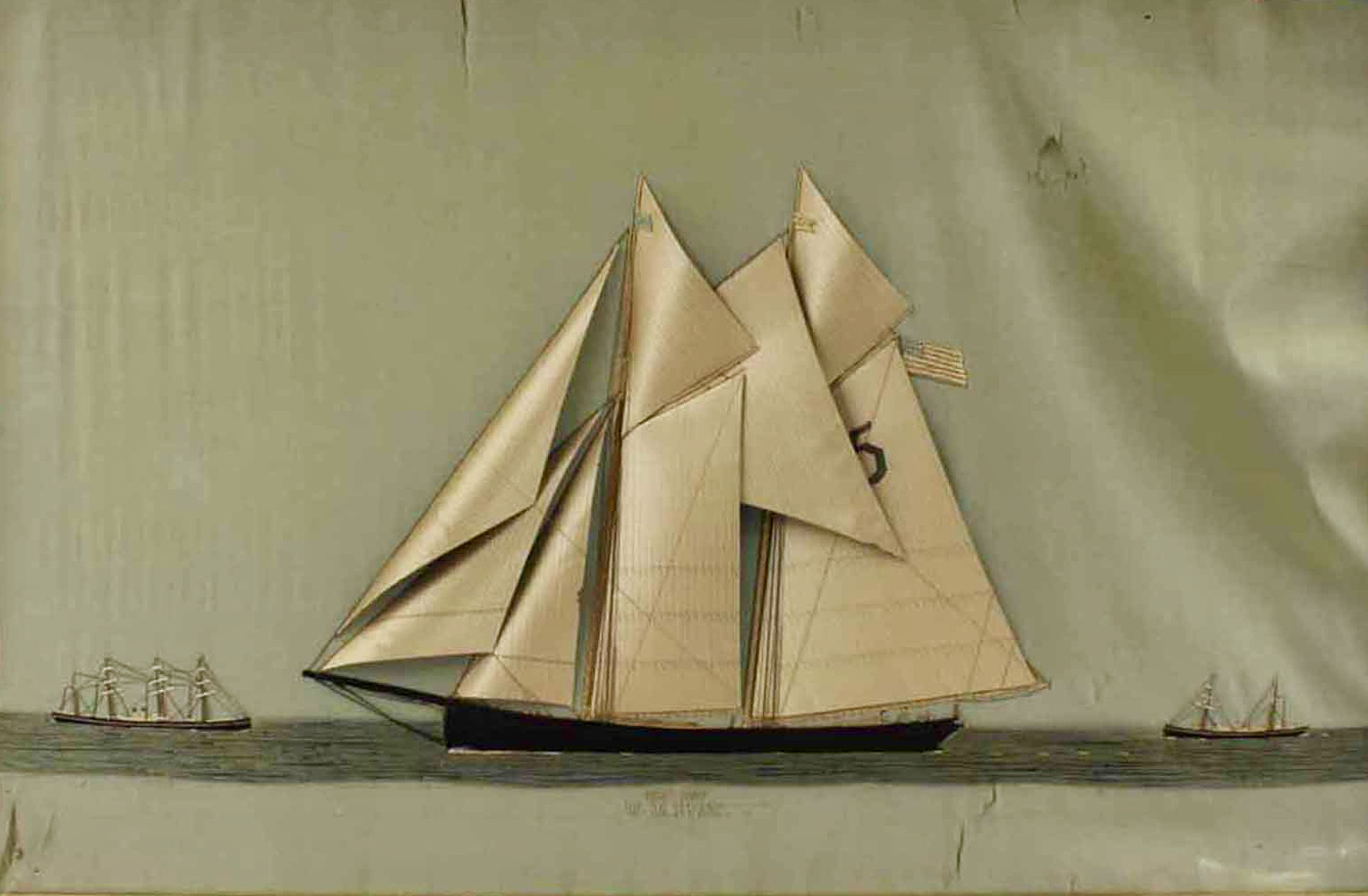
- Pilot Boat, W. W. Story, with two ships in distance.

History

United States
- Name: W. W. Story
- Namesake: Captain William W. Story (1798-1875)
- Owner: Thomas Conley; Alexander Cochrane; Cisco; Cumskey
- Operator: Jerry Reardon; Alexander Cochrane; Thomas Conley (1876-1891); Ludwign Lawson (1893-1900
- Builder: Samuel H. Pine
- Launched: October 2, 1874
- Out of service: April 2, 1888
- Home port: Port of New York
- Fate: Sank in Blizzard of 1888; Sank in October 14, 1896 hurricane

General characteristics
- Tons burthen: 50 Tonnage
- Length: 76 ft 0 in (23.16 m)
- Beam: 20 ft 6 in (6.25 m)
- Depth: 7 ft 3 in (2.21 m)
- Propulsion: schooner sail
- Sail plan: Schooner-rigged; 71 ft 9 in (21.87 m) mainmast; 70 ft 3 in (21.41 m) foremast; 50 ft 3 in (15.32 m) main boom
- Notes: six births and two staterooms

W. W. Story was a 19th-century New Jersey pilot boat built in 1874 at the Samuel H. Pine shipyard in Greenpoint, New York. She sank off Sandy Hook horseshoe during the Blizzard of 1888. She was raised and turned into a fishing smack. On November 13, 1896, she was reported missing along with her crew after being last seen along Absecon, New Jersey when she was caught up in a hurricane.

== Construction and service ==
W. W. Story was a wood pilot boat launched on October 2, 1874, from the Samuel H. Pine shipyard at the foot of Java Street, Greenpoint, New York. Conley, Cisco & Cumskey were owners. She was 77 feet, 2 inches in length; 21 feet breadth of beam; 7 feet 10 inches depth of hold; 71.9 and 70.3 feet height of main mast and foremast and 52-tons.

The W. W. Story was registered as a pilot Schooner with the Record of American and Foreign Shipping, from 1876 to 1900. Her ship master was Thomas Conley; her owners were New Jersey pilots; built in 1874 at Greenpoint, New York; and her hailing port was the Port of New York. Her dimensions were 76 ft. in length; 20.6 ft. breadth of beam; 7.3 ft. depth of hold; and 50-tons Tonnage. Her hailing port was Port of New Jersey from 1876 to 1878.

On August 12, 1875, shipbuilder Edward A. Williams, of the Greenpoint Savings Bank, sailed her for a two-week cruise on the New Jersey pilot boat W. W. Story, No. 5.

On March 12, 1878, Sandy Hook pilot Alexander Cochrane died. He was a pilot and part owner of the W. W. Story.

== End of service ==
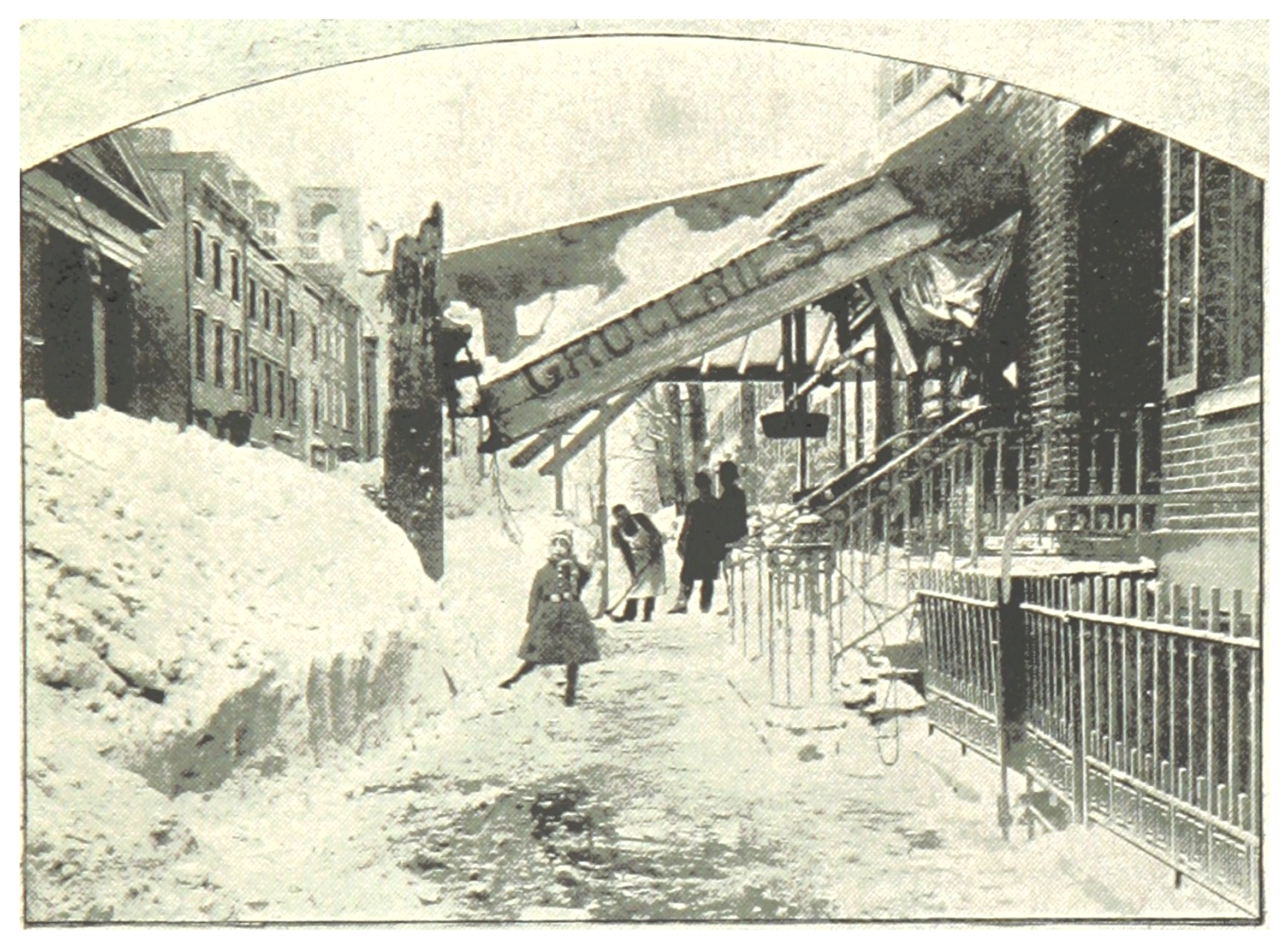
Blizzard of 1888.

On March 14, 1888, the pilot boat W. W. Story, No. 5 of New Jersey, sank off Sandy Hook horseshoe during the Blizzard of 1888 along with Edmund Blunt and Edward F. Williams. She refloated, repaired and returned to service. From 1888 to 1891 she was still registered with Captain Thomas Conley. From 1893 to 1900 she was registered with Captain Ludwig Lawson.

The W. W. Story was later turned into a fishing smack. On November 13, 1896, she was reported off Absecon, New Jersey, having been caught in a hurricane on October 14. Eleven of her crew were given up as lost along with Captain Lovigh.

== See also ==
- List of Northeastern U. S. Pilot Boats
