= Edmund Blunt (pilot boat) =

New York Pilot boat

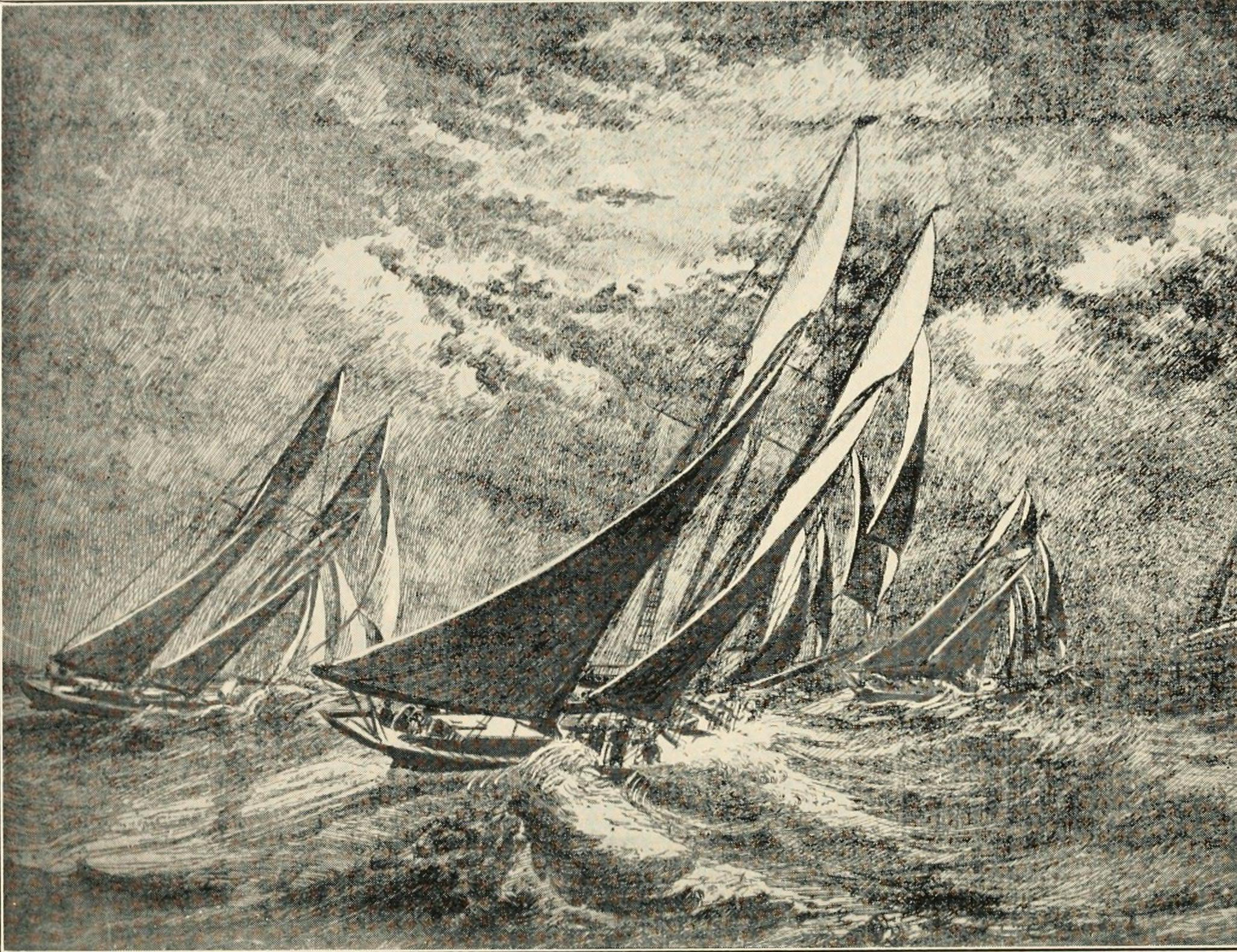
- Pilot boats Williams, Bateman, and Edmund Blunt, c. 1890.

History

United States
- Name: Edmund Blunt
- Namesake: Edmund March Blunt, author, and publisher of nautical magazines
- Owner: New York pilots: Abraham Jones, Josiah Johnson, Jr., Frank Penay, Louis Samson
- Operator: Josiah Johnson, Jr.; Abraham Jones
- Builder: Edward F. Williams
- Launched: August 18, 1858
- Out of service: February 1, 1896
- Home port: New York
- Fate: Sold

General characteristics
- Class & type: Schooner
- Displacement: 56 tons TM
- Length: 84 ft 0 in (25.60 m)
- Beam: 20 ft 0 in (6.10 m)
- Draught: 8 ft 0 in (2.44 m)
- Propulsion: sails
- Sail plan: Schooner-rigged

Edmund Blunt was a 19th-century New York pilot boat built in 1858 by Edward F. Williams for the New York Pilots. She helped transport New York City maritime pilots between inbound or outbound ships coming into the New York Harbor. She survived the Great Blizzard of 1888. In the age of steam, the Blunt along with other pilot boats, were replaced with steamboats. She was built to replace the Jacob L. Westervelt, which sank in 1857.

== Construction and service ==
The New York pilot-boat Edmund Blunt, No. 2, was launched on 18 August 1858, by Edward F. Williams from his Greenpoint, Brooklyn shipyard to replace the Jacob L. Westervelt, that was run down by the Bremen steamer Saxonia on 21 April 1857.

The Edmund Blunt, No. 2, was one of only twenty-one New York and New Jersey pilot boats listed in the year 1860.

The Edmund Blunt was registered as a pilot schooner with the Record of American and Foreign Shipping, from 1876 to 1900. Her ship master was Captain Josiah Johnson Jr.; her owners were the New York Pilots; built in 1861 at New York; and her hailing port was the Port of New York. Her dimensions were 84 ft. in length; 20 ft. breadth of beam; 8 ft. depth of hold; and 56-tons burthen (121-tons carpenter's measurement). The boat number "2" was painted as a large number on her mainsail, that identified her as belonging to the Sandy Hook Pilots.

On October 9, 1873, the Edmund Blunt was one of the boats that participated in the Cap May Regatta, which was a race from Owl's Head Point around to Cape May Lighthouse in New Jersey, and back to the Sandy Hook Lightship. She was listed as No. 2 in the race.

On April 8, 1883, the pilot-boat Edmund Blunt, found the brig Mary Gibbs, beaten by a hurricane and in bad shape. The Blunt towed the brig to the Highlands (of Navesink) and handed her over to the tugboat Indian, which brought her into the port of New York.

In the Great Blizzard of 1888, the Edmund Blunt, No. 2, was one was one of 17 vessels out on pilot duty at the time of the storm. She went ashore on the Long Island coast. Pilot Abraham Jones was in command at the time of the storm. He took cover at a house near the Sandy Hook Lighthouse. Mrs. W. W. Stewart fed the men and allowed them to stay the night. The men from the pilot boats Edward F. Williams, Edward Cooper, W. W. Story and the Centennial joined them.

In May 1890, pilot boats Mary A. Williams, William H. Bateman and Edmund Blunt raced and competed for honors to reach several ocean liners coming into port off Sandy Hook. The North German Lloyd steamship, Rhein, was in reach and the pilot boats raced to her side. The Bateman won the race by less than a dozen yards.

== Out of service ==
On February 1, 1896, the New York Pilots discarded sixteen sailboats and moved them to the Erie Basin in Brooklyn. They were replaced with steam pilot boats. The Edmund Blunt, was sold for $2,000. The Blunt went on to do ferry duty between the islands of the West Indies.

== See also ==
- Pilot boats
- List of Northeastern U. S. Pilot Boats
