= Joseph N. Lord =

New York Pilot boat

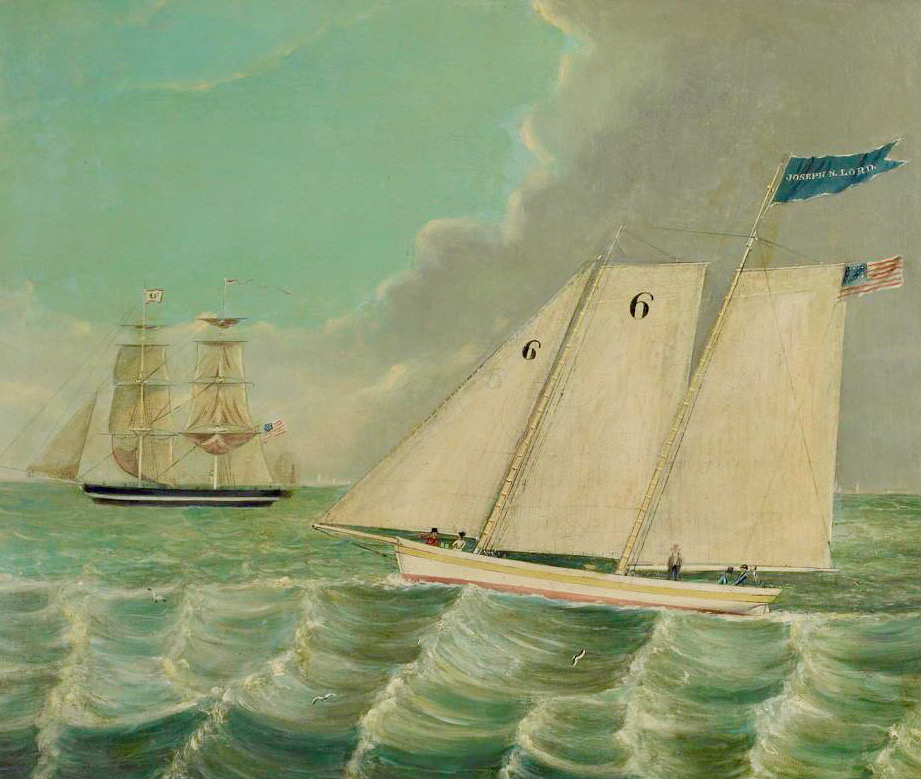
- Pilot boat Joseph N. Lord, No. 6.

History

United States
- Name: Blossom
- Namesake: Joseph Nathan Lord (1785-1857) of the Leather Manufacturers' Bank, New York Fire Insurance Company
- Owner: New York Pilots
- Operator: Jarvis P. Calvert, John J. Canvin Sr.
- Builder: Jabez Williams
- Launched: February 7, 1840
- Out of service: June 28, 1845
- Homeport: New York
- Fate: Sank

General characteristics
- Class & type: Schooner
- Propulsion: sails
- Sail plan: Schooner-rigged

The SHP Joseph N. Lord was a 19th-century Sandy Hook pilot boat built in 1840 at the Jabez Williams shipyard in East River, for New York pilots. She helped transport maritime pilots between inbound or outbound ships coming into the New York Harbor. The Joseph N. Lord was lost at sea in 1845 at Port-au-Platt, Dominican Republic.

== Construction and service ==
The pilot boat Joseph N. Lord was launched on February 7, 1840, from the Jabez Williams shipyard on the East River. She was at first called the Thunderer but changed her name to Joseph N. Lord by her trail trip. She had the number 6 painted on her mainsail and a pennant flag with her name on it. On February 25, 1850, the Joseph N. Lord went on her first cruise past Sandy Hook. Commodore Hammell was on board.

John J. Canvin Sr., started in the pilot service as a pilot on the pilot boat Joseph N. Lord.

On December 14, 1840, Jarvis P. Calvert of the pilot boat Joseph N. Lord, along with other pilots from the port of New York, stated in a public letter to the New York Daily Herald that they had never been employed by J. D. Stevenson as their agent and any services which he may have rendered their delegates at Washington, no compensation has been offered or demanded.

On May 13, 1842, an apprentice Charles Allen, age 20, on the Joseph N. Lord, was lost when the main sheet hit him and knocked him overboard where he sank.

On March 15, 1844, an Admiral of the New York Clipper Boats thanked the pilots of the Charlotte Ann, Jacob Bell, Blossom, and Joseph N. Lord for their service and for the fact that they have often been boarded two hundred miles at sea by New York pilots.

The New York Pilotage reported that pilot boat Joseph N. Lord boarded and brought thirty one vessels safely into port in the past month for August 1844.

== End of service ==
The Joseph N. Lord was cleared to leave the port of New York on December 1, 1844, with Captain Jones for Port-au-Platt, Dominican Republic, now called Haiti. She arrived in the foreign port of Port-au-Platt on April 18, 1845. She was scheduled to leave for New York on May 21. However, on June 28, 1845, the pilot boat Joseph N. Lord, from Port-au-Platt headed for the city of St. Domingo. She was lost on the east side of the island. Captain Fainham of the schooner Orlando, stated that another 100-ton schooner sank a mile to the southwest of the boat.

== See also ==
- Pilot boats.
- List of Northeastern U. S. Pilot Boats
