= USS Fahkee =

Former tugboat of the United States Navy

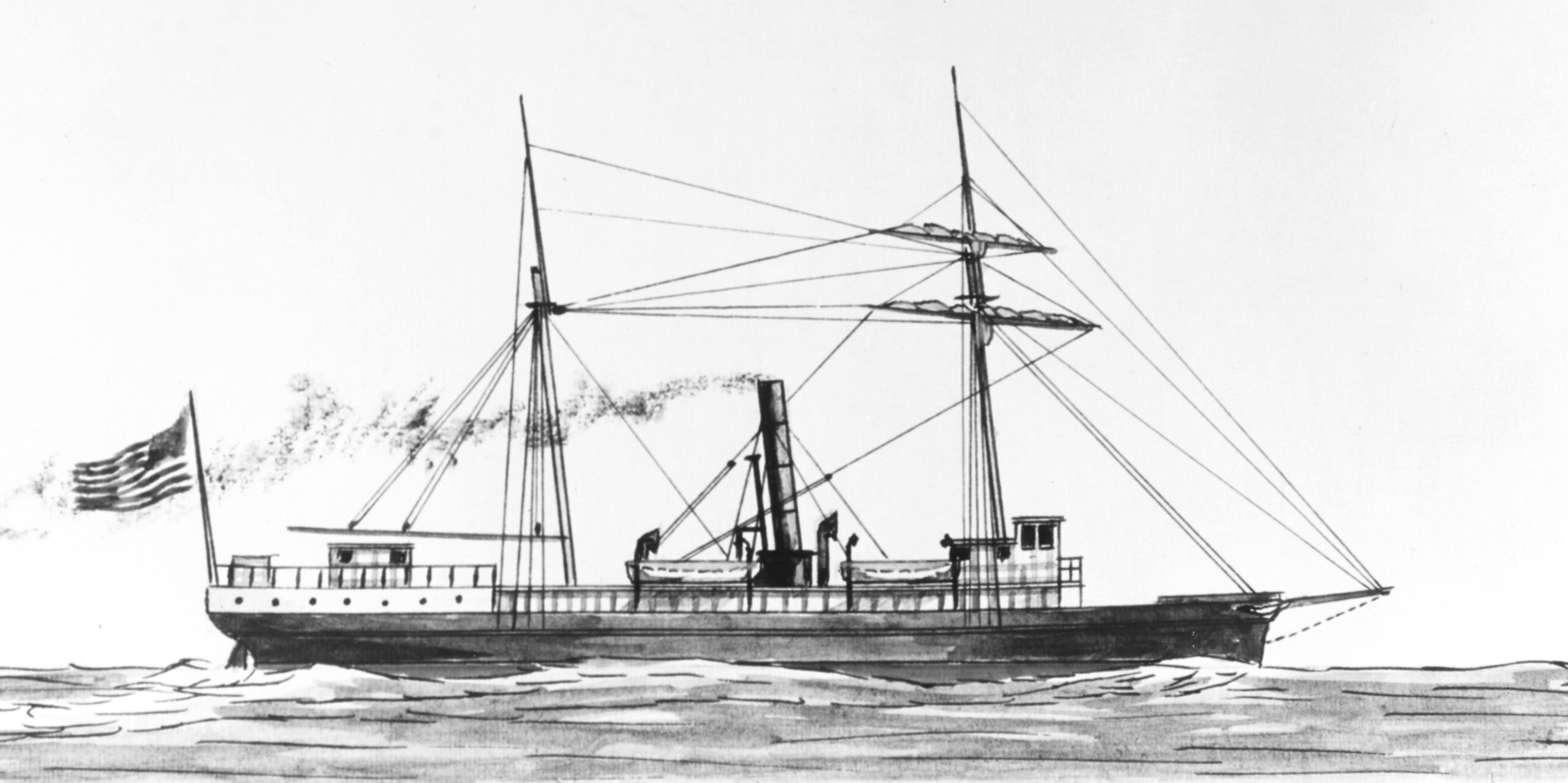
- The merchant steamship Fah-Kee, which served as USS Fahkee during the Civil War

History

United States
- Name: Fah Kee or Fah-Kee
- Owner: 1862-1863: Wetmore & Cryder; 1863-1863: Adams Express; 1865-1869: Waydell & Co; 1869-1872: J Norman Harvey
- Port of registry: New York
- Builder: Edward F Williams, Greenport NY
- Launched: 24 November 1862
- Completed: February 1863
- Fate: Sold

United States
- Name: USS Fahkee
- Acquired: 15 July 1863
- Commissioned: 24 September 1863
- Decommissioned: 28 June 1865
- Stricken: 1865 (est.)
- Home port: Port Royal, South Carolina
- Fate: Sold, 10 August 1865

Canada
- Name: Pictou
- Namesake: Pictou
- Owner: Quebec and Gulf Ports Steamship Co
- Port of registry: Quebec
- Fate: Missing 1873, probably burnt

General characteristics
- Type: Passenger-cargo and naval collier
- Tonnage: 745 GRT; from c1866 601GRT; from 1872 757GRT
- Displacement: 660 long tons (670 t)
- Length: 163 ft (50 m)
- Beam: 29 ft 6 in (8.99 m)
- Draft: 13 ft 3 in (4.04 m)
- Installed power: 300hp (later 100nhp)
- Propulsion: Steam engine; screw-propelled
- Speed: 12 kn (14 mph; 22 km/h)
- Complement: (naval) 73
- Armament: 2 × 24-pounder howitzers; 1 × 10-pounder rifle (1863-65)

The passenger-cargo steamer Fah-Kee (or Fah Kee) was launched in 1862 at Greenpoint, Brooklyn and operated on the United States coast until purchased in July 1863 by the Union Navy during the American Civil War. The Navy used USS Fahkee as a collier and freight supply ship assigned to assist Union Navy ships patrolling Confederate waterways.

At the end of the war she returned to mercantile service, as a mail ship to Cuba and Bermuda. In 1872 she was sold to Canadian owners, and renamed Pictou for service between that port and Quebec. In November 1873 she went missing and was believed lost by fire.

== Construction and commercial service ==
Fah Kee or Fah-Kee, designed to carry both cargo and passengers was built of white oak in 1862 by the New York shipbuilder Edward F. Williams at his yard at Greenpoint, Brooklyn. (Note: DANFS has place of build as Williamsburg, but the Williams shipyard had moved from there to Greenpoint in 1850.) She measured 745 GRT, with a length of 175 ft (53 m), beam of 30 ft (9.1 m), depth of hold 18 ft (5.5 m) and draft of 14 ft (4.3 m). The ship was powered by a 300hp steam engine with a single vertical cylinder of 42 inches diameter and 42 inches stroke, made by Pusey and Jones of Wilmington, Delaware and driving a single propeller. In addition, she carried sail, rigged as a brigantine.

The ship, intended for trading in the Far East, was launched on 24 November 1862 for Wetmore & Cryder of New York City, and named Fah Kee ("flowery flag" in Cantonese), a Chinese nickname for the USA. By then, however, she was already expected to be taken up for service with the United States Navy. Nevertheless, when Fah Kee was completed in February 1863, she was sold to the Adams Express Company and put into passenger-cargo service between the ports of New York, Beaufort, North Carolina and Port Royal, South Carolina. On 15 July the ship was purchased by the Union Navy.

== Civil War service ==
=== North Atlantic Blockade ===
USS Fahkee was commissioned on 24 September 1863 with Acting Master F. R. Webb in command, and served the North Atlantic Blockading Squadron as a collier and freight supply ship from the time of her commissioning to the close of the war. She carried cargo from New York City, Norfolk, Virginia, and Newport News, Virginia to the fleet on the North Carolina coast, as well as providing towing services and patrolling on blockade at frequent intervals.

=== Operation in Battle ===
Fahkee first came under fire on 3 January 1864 in Lockwood's Folly Inlet near Wilmington, North Carolina, when she passed through musket and shell fire from the shore to investigate Bendigo, a blockade runner grounded and afire. Fahkee shelled the ship to further her destruction, which was completed the next day by other ships.

While blockading Wilmington, North Carolina, in the spring and summer of 1864, Fahkee was several times fired upon by Confederate shore batteries, and on 24 August, engaged a blockade runner. Returning to the same area after a voyage to New York and Hampton Roads, she twice fired on grounded blockade runners in December. In January 1865, she carried cargo from Norfolk to Beaufort and to the fleet operating against Fort Fisher.

=== South Atlantic Squadron and disposal ===
In April 1865, at the close of the war, Fahkee was assigned to the South Atlantic Squadron, and from Port Royal, South Carolina, provisioned ships at Charleston, South Carolina, and those cruising the coast of the Carolinas. She also cruised with the Squadron off Cuba before arriving at Philadelphia, Pennsylvania on 19 June.

Fahkee was decommissioned on 28 June 1865, and sold in Philadelphia on 10 August.

== Further commercial service ==
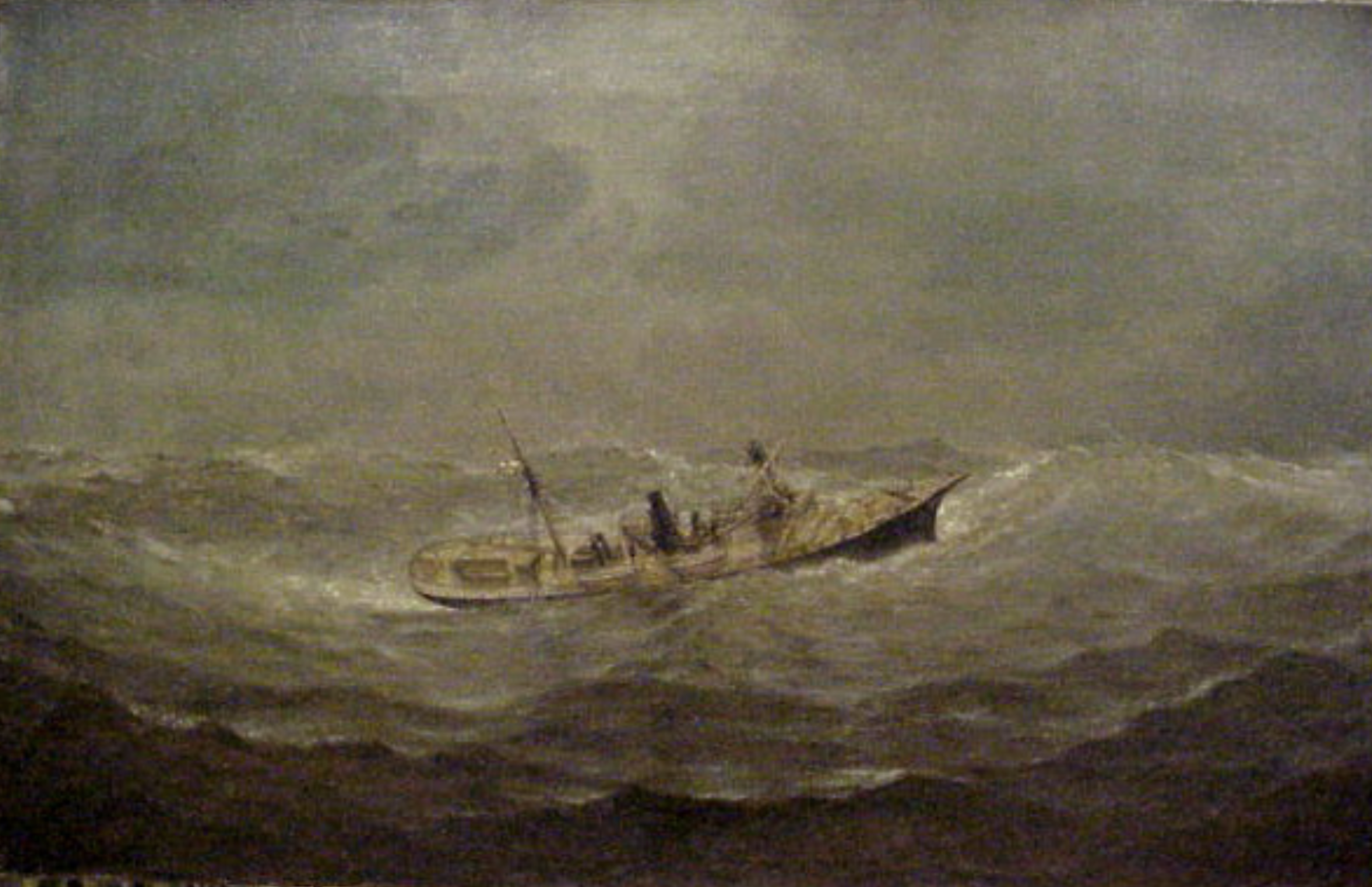
Fahkee steamer in a gale, painting by Conrad Freitag.

Reverting to Fah Kee, the ship was bought by Waydell & Co, New York for their US Mail contract, operating from November 1865 between Santiago de Cuba and New York, via Bermuda; she was remeasured at 601 GRT. On 1 August 1867, on a mail voyage from New York to Santiago via Nuevitas, she was severely damaged in a hurricane in 36.40N 73.50W - about 80 nautical miles (150 km; 92 mi) east of Virginia Beach, Virginia - with the engine disabled and the ship leaking badly. After passengers and crew manned the pumps and the engine was eventually restarted, Fah Kee returned to New York on 5 August. She continued in the Cuba and Bermuda trades until mid-1869, when she was sold to J Norman Harvey, was refurbished, and continued in the mail service with Bermuda.

In March 1872, Fah Kee was sold to the Quebec and Gulf Ports Steamship Company to run between Pictou, Nova Scotia and ports on the Saint Lawrence River, and was renamed Pictou. She was registered as a British ship at Quebec on 23 May 1872 with Official Number 66004 and under British regulations was measured as 757GRT and 544NRT, with a length of 166.0 ft (50.6 m), beam of 28.8 ft (8.8 m) and depth of hold 18.2 ft (5.5 m); the engine was then rated at only 100 nominal horsepower. (Note: The Mercantile Navy List mis-spelled the ship's name as "Picton".)

== Loss ==
In November 1873 Pictou sailed from Quebec City for Pictou with calls along the way. She was last seen passing Father's Point, near Rimouski, Quebec, and it was reported that there were heavy gales in the area shortly afterwards. However, there were later reports of a fire at sea being observed from Fairfield, north-east Prince Edward Island, from the Magdalen Islands and from Pleasant Bay, Cape Breton Island on the night of 18 November. Wreckage also came ashore showing signs of burning.
