= E. K. Collins (pilot boat) =

New York Pilot boat

History

United States
- Name: E. K. Collins
- Namesake: Edward Knight Collins
- Owner: New York Pilots: Wm. P. Tornure, John L. Tornure, James H. Tornure, Eugene H. Sullivan, James R. Murphy
- Operator: Robert B. Mitchell, James R. Murphy
- Cost: 4,500
- In service: early 1840s
- Out of service: January 10, 1856
- Stricken: Ran ashore on the outer bar of Fire Island
- Homeport: New York
- Fate: Sank

General characteristics
- Tonnage: 89-tons TM
- Propulsion: schooner sail
- Sail plan: Schooner-rigged

The E. K. Collins was a 19th-century Sandy Hook pilot boat built in the early 1840s. She was named for the American shipping magnate Edward Knight Collins. During a winter storm, the Collins ran ashore on the outer bar of Fire Island in 1856.

== Construction and service ==
New York pilot-boat E. K. Collins, was built in the early 1840s. An early report of the E. K. Collins No. 11, appeared in the New York Daily Herald on December 17, 1844, which talked about the Collins with Captain Turner of New York, taking a 3-day cruise and coming to port for provisions. She was named for the American ship-owner Edward Knight Collins.

She was 89-tons burthen and owned by Wm. P. Tornure, John L. Tornure, James H. Tornure, Eugene H. Sullivan and James R. Murphy. On February 6, 1845, the Collins, while on pilot duty, went ashore at Gowanus Bay because of gale and ice. The next day, she was able to come into New York City.

On February 1, 1848, eighteen miles south of Sandy Hook, two pilots, Robert Smith and Andrew Foster, from the pilot-boat E. K. Collins, lost their lives attempting to board the brig Robert Bruce.

On December 3, 1852, the pilot boat E. K. Collins picked up one of the two yawls from the pilot boat Yankee, No. 7, that struck an old wreck and sank 35 miles east of Sandy Hook.

== End of service ==
On January 10, 1856, in a blinding snow storm, the E. K. Collins No. 11 ran ashore on the outer bar of Fire Island, Long Island, about thirty-six miles from Sandy Hook. Captain James R. Murphy was in command of the helm. Those that escaped in a yawl were pilot James R. Murphy, pilot William Roach, and apprentice James Sullivan. Boatkeeper Morris Ellwood drowned when attempting to escape. The apprentice, James Rush, was on the ice covered boat for thirty-two hours before he was picked up by a life-boat. Three of the crew were frozen to death, including Sandy Hook pilot Robert B. Mitchell, cabin boy Wellan "Billy" Williams and the cook. The E. K. Collins was valued at $4,500. If the Fire Island Lighthouse had a government life-saving service, they could have rescued the men.

== See also ==
- List of Northeastern U. S. Pilot Boats
