= Yankee (pilot boat) =

19th-century Sandy Hook pilot boat

History

United States
- Name: Yankee
- Owner: New York Pilots
- Operator: William J. Murphy
- Builder: Holbrook & Adams of Boston
- In service: September 20, 1848
- Out of service: December 3, 1852
- Stricken: wreck
- Homeport: New York
- Fate: Sank

General characteristics
- Tonnage: 84-tons TM
- Propulsion: schooner sail
- Sail plan: Schooner-rigged

The Yankee was a 19th-century Sandy Hook pilot boat built by Holbrook & Adams of Boston in 1848. The schooner was sold to New York pilots and used to pilot vessels to and from the Port of New York. In 1852 the crew of the Yankee received silver medals from the Massachusetts Humane Society for rescuing the captain and mate of the schooner Reaper. The Yankee struck an old wreck and sank 35 miles east of Sandy Hook in 1852. The Ellwood Walter was built to replace her in 1853.

== Construction and service ==
The 84-ton pilot boat Yankee was built in 1848 by Holbrook & Adams of Boston. She was put up for sale by Holbrook & Adams, 137 Commercial Street, Boston, on August 30, 1848. She left Boston on September 20, 1848, for the Battery in New York City.

On November 12, 1848, in one of the first cruises, the Yankee No. 7, came across the wrecked schooner Justice in need of help. The steamship Washington and first officer Jas. P. Noyes came to the schooner's assistance and towed her to Newport. Noyes reported that the Yankee did not provide assistance thinking that the schooner's request was not serious.

Captain Clark of the ship James Wright, refused to take a pilot from the pilot boat Yankee, because none of the pilots had grey hair. He wanted an older pilot that had more experience. He even asked them to take off their hats to show their hair. A report of this act of injustice was reported to the editor of the New York Herald on March 28, 1851, by a pilot.

On March 25, 1852, the pilot boat Yankee came across the schooner Reaper of Yarmouth, Massachusetts, that had capsized and sank in a heavy storm off Montauk, New York. The crew of five from the Reaper escaped in a yawl but as they came within twenty yards to the pilot boat the yawl capsized. Captain Isaiah C. Kelley and Frederick Cobb clung to the yawl and were picked up by the Yankee, but the other three men drowned. The pilots on board the Yankee, John Curtis, John Leibby, William J. Murphy and William Champlin, received silver medals from the Massachusetts Humane Society, for rescuing the captain and mate of the schooner Reaper. The medals were presented by the New York Life-Saving Benevolent Association.

== End of service ==
On December 3, 1852, the pilot boat Yankee, No. 7, struck an old wreck and sank 35 miles east of Sandy Hook. The men on board escaped in two yawls. One of the yawls got separated in a violent storm and four men were lost. Those that were lost were pilots Henry Budd and John Curtis; crew members Henry Smith and Frederick West. The other yawl was picked up by the pilot boat E. K. Collins. The names of the rescued men were pilots John McGee and Charles W. Harthorn; crew members Andrew Collier, William Gatenby and Thomas Dennis. An attempt was made on December 16, 1852, to search for the sunken wreck. The steam tug Titan was chartered by the Board of Underwriters with pilot William J. Murphy conducting the search. He reported that the wreck was not found within a circle of seventy miles from Fire Island.

The Ellwood Walter was built to replace the Yankee in 1853.

== See also ==
- List of Northeastern U. S. Pilot Boats
