= Ellwood Walter, No. 7 =

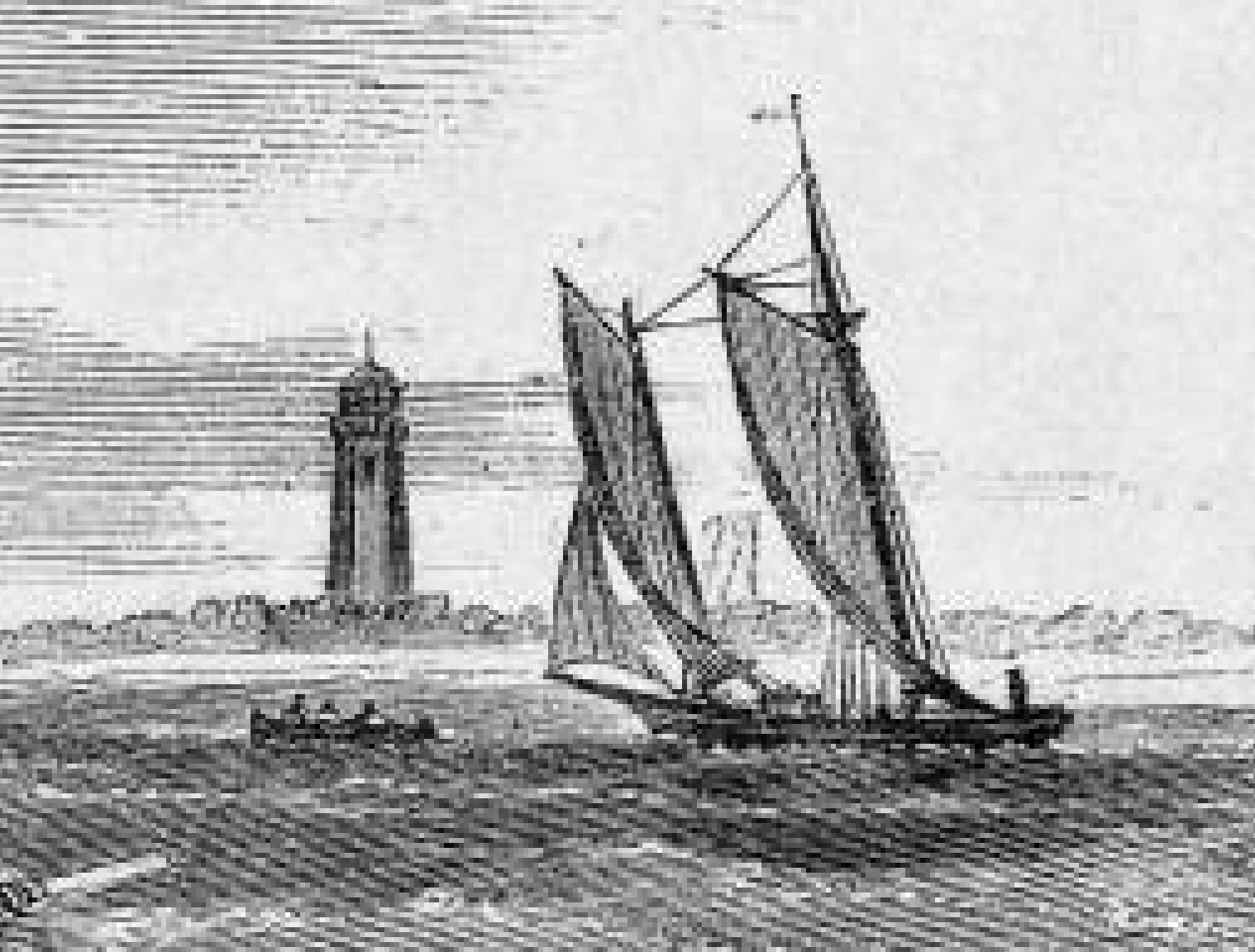

History

United States
- Name: Ellwood Walter, No. 7
- Namesake: E. W.
- Owner: Joseph Henderson, William J. Murphy, Augustus H. Murphy, Charles W. Hawthorne, Thomas Orr
- Operator: William J. Murphy
- Route: Port of New York
- Builder: Edward F. Williams
- Launched: 1853
- Acquired: about 1853
- In service: May 16, 1853
- Out of service: 1864

General characteristics
- Tonnage: 90-tons TM
- Length: 71 ft 6 in (21.79 m)
- Beam: 19 ft 10 in (6.05 m)
- Depth: 7 ft 6 in (2.29 m)
- Propulsion: schooner sail
- Sail plan: Schooner-rigged
- Speed: 10 knots
- Complement: not known

The Ellwood Walter, No. 7 was a 19th-century Sandy Hook pilot boat built in 1853 by Edward F. Williams at Greenpoint, Brooklyn to replace the pilot boat Yankee, which was lost in December 1852. The schooner was used to pilot vessels to and from the Port of New York. She was replaced by the Edmund Driggs, No. 7, in 1864.

== Construction and service ==
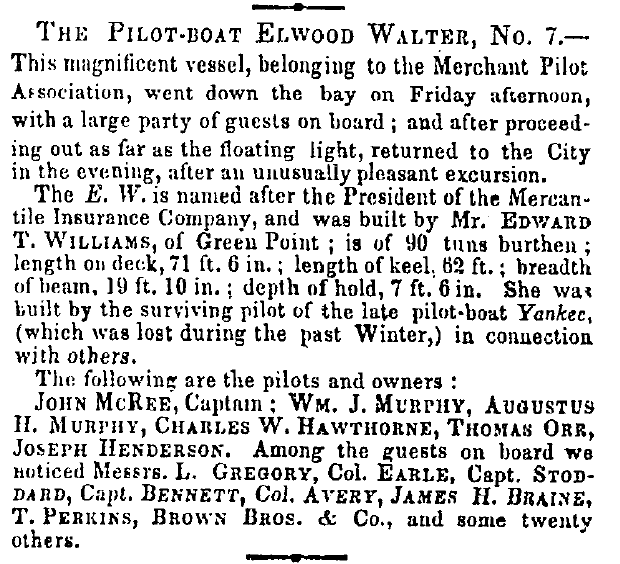
Pilot Boat Elwood Walter.

In January 1853, the pilot boat Ellwood Walter was built by Edward F. Williams at Greenpoint, Brooklyn. On May 16, 1853, The pilot boat Elwood Walter, No. 7, belonging to the Merchant Pilot Association, went down the bay with a large party of guests on board. She went out as far as the Sandy Hook light and returned to the city. The schooner was named after Ellwood Walter, the President of the Mercantile Mutual Insurance Company. Walter had extensive experience and knowledge as an insurance underwriter. Her dimensions were 71.6 ft. in length on deck; 19.10 ft. breadth of beam; 7.6 ft. depth of hold; and 90-tons Tonnage. She was built to replace the pilot boat Yankee, which was lost in December 1852. She was owned by the following pilots: Captain John McRee, William J. Murphy, Augustus H. Murphy, Charles W. Hawthorne, Thomas Orr, and Joseph Henderson.

Several Sandy Hook pilots received their pilot license sailing on the Elwood Walter. Captain Joseph Henderson received his license as a Branch Pilot on the Elwood Walter on September 13, 1853, from the Board of Commissioners of Pilots. He was a commander of the Elwood Walter throughout his training.

On January 21, 1857, the Elwood Walter, No. 7 was reported "AT STATEN ISLAND IN THE ICE." The report describes the bad weather conditions a day after a major storm. It lists the owners of the Elwood Walter, and says "this boat is also hard and fast at Staten Island." On August 3, 1855, a pilot from the Elwood Walter, No. 7, boarded the steamship J. Jones, from Cardiff, Wales and was headed for New York.

The Elwood Walter, No. 7 was listed as one of only twenty-one New York and New Jersey pilot-boats in 1860. She was listed as one of these early American pilot boats.

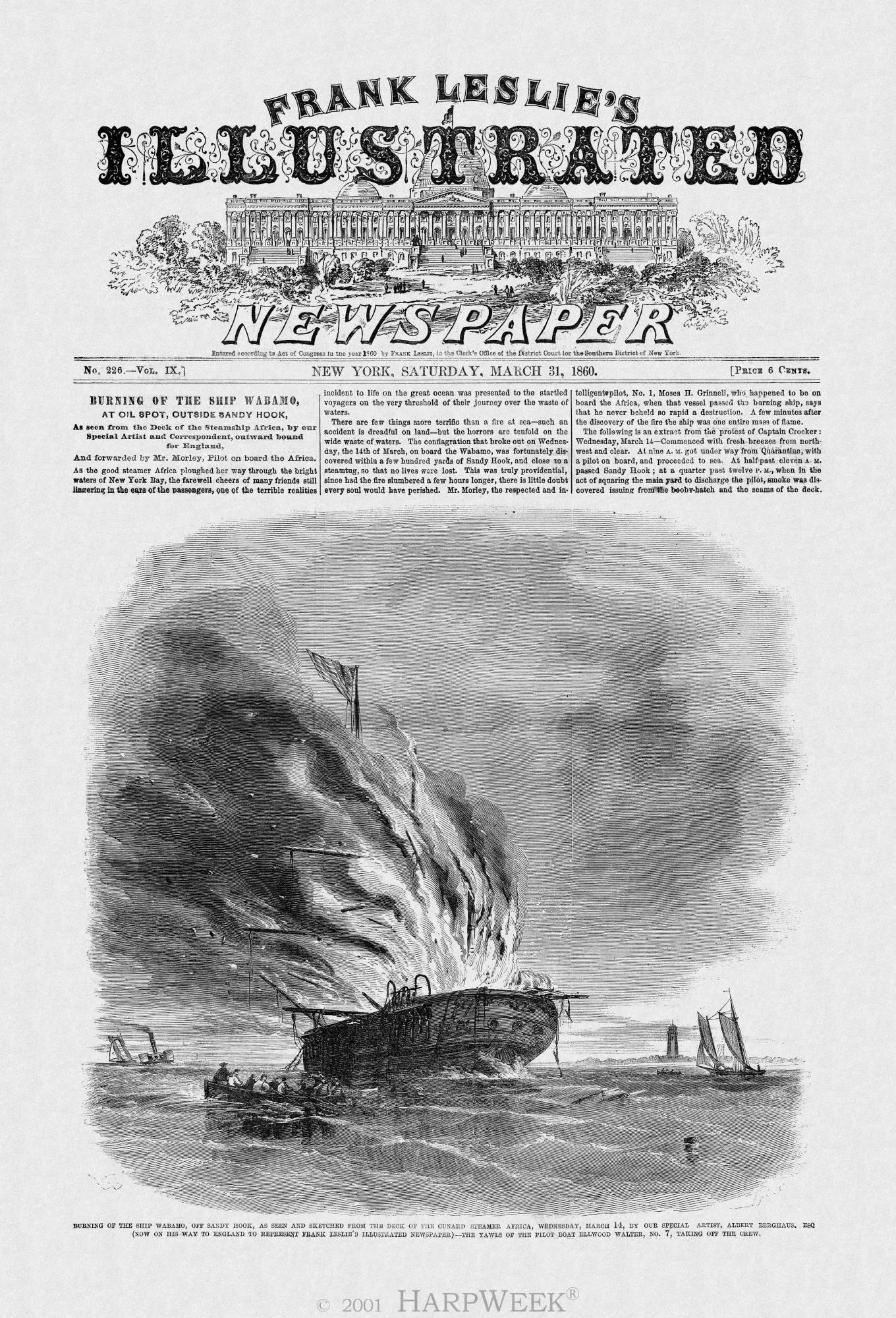
Burning of the ship Wabamo in 1860

On March 15, 1860, the Ellwood Walter, No. 7, helped take the officers and crew off the ship Wabamo, in the New York harbor, when it caught fire while going down the bay outside Sandy Hook. The New York Daily Tribune ran a story that read: "BURNING OF THE SHIP WABAMO IN NEW YORK HARBOR – In New York, this day, the ship Wabamo, Captain Doty bound from New York for Antwerp caught fire about noon, while going down the bay, and burned to the water's edge. The flumes spread with such rapidity as to defy every effort to subdue them. The officers and crew were taken off by the pilot boat Elwood Walter, saving little more than the clothing on their backs. The ship was built in Wiscasset, Maine, in 1854, and owned by Messrs. Layton & Hurlbut Co., and was valued at $32,000. Her loss is covered by insurance. She had an assorted cargo of merchandise valued at $70,000 which was insured for $54,457."

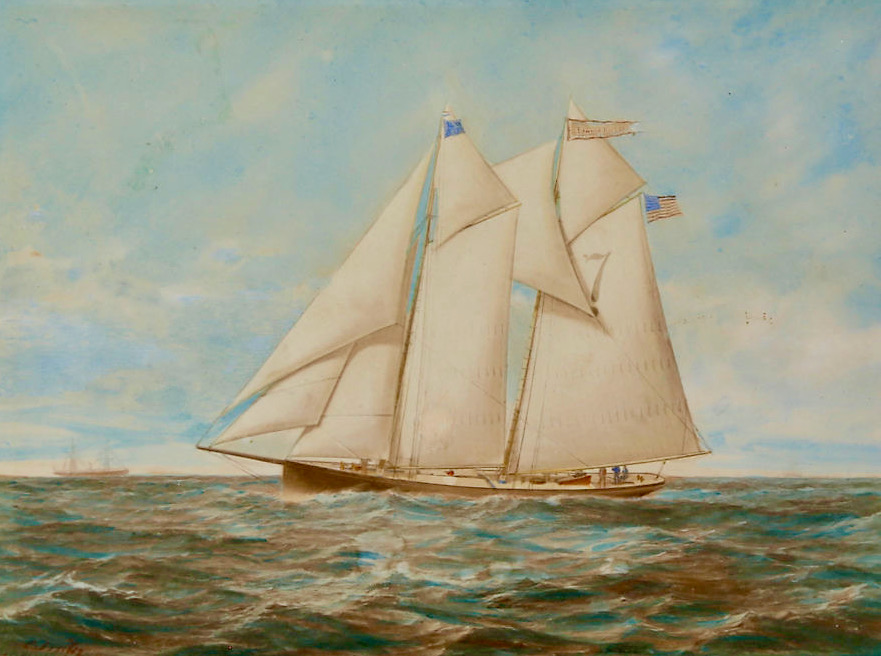
Edmund Driggs pilot boat

On October 10, 1860, New York Sandy Hook Pilot Augustus H. Murphy, of the pilot boat Ellwood Walter, No. 7, signed a statement along with other pilots, that they were satisfied with the representation they have received from the New York Board of Commissioners of Pilots. Other reports of the Ellwood Walter were reported from 1861 to 1863 by the New York Times.

== End of service ==
New York pilot-boat Edmund Driggs, No. 7, was launched from the shipyard of E. F. Williams, at Greenpoint, Brooklyn on 27 February 1864, as a replacement for the Elwood Walter No. 7.

== See also ==
- List of Northeastern U. S. Pilot Boats
