= SS Suevia (1874) =

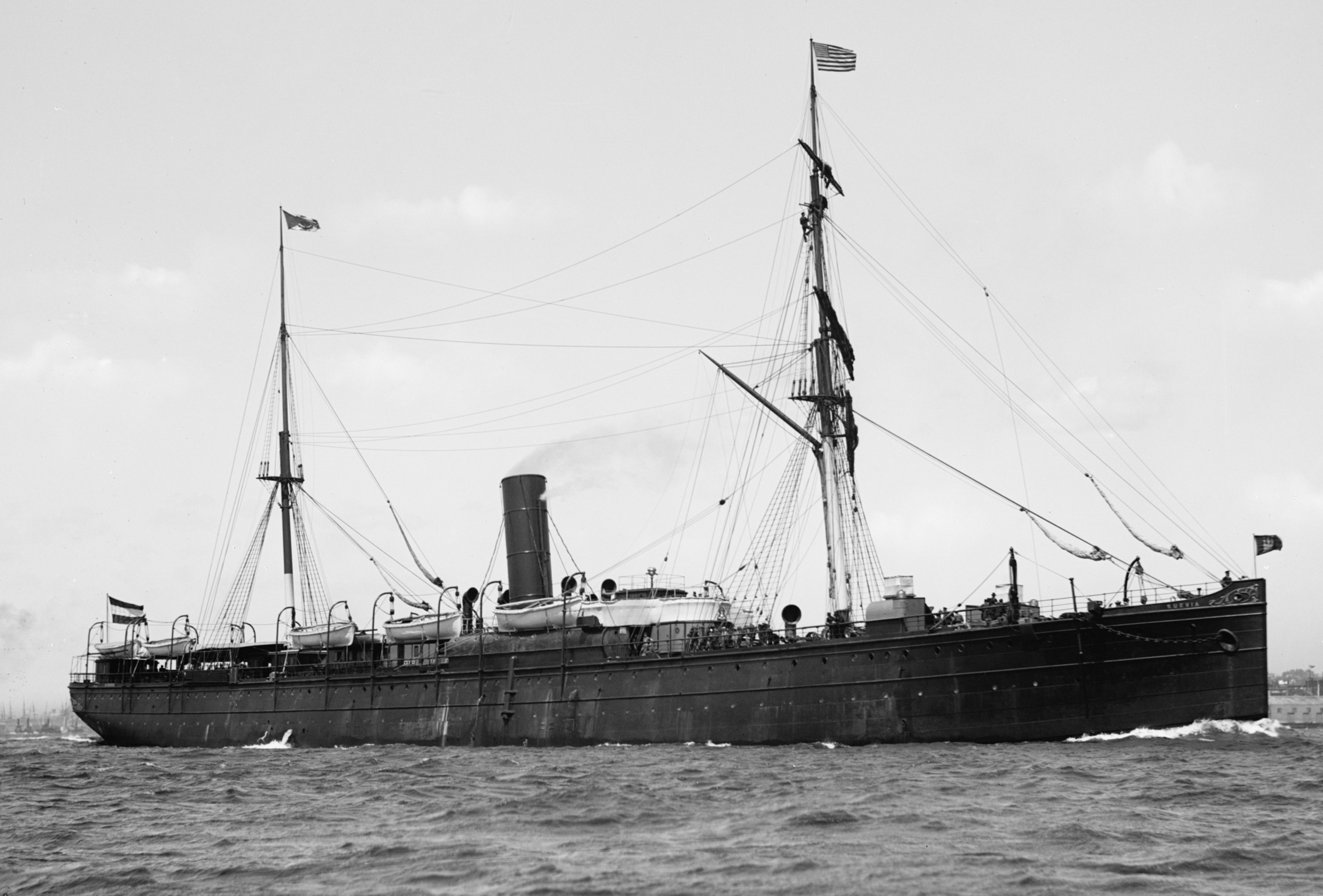
- Suevia

History

Germany
- Name: Suevia
- Owner: Hamburg America Line
- Operator: Hamburg America Line
- Builder: Caird & Co., Greenock, Scotland
- Launched: 1 June 1874
- Commissioned: 21 October 1874
- Recommissioned: 1896
- Decommissioned: 1898
- Fate: Collided with Commodore Bateman 1889; scrapped 1898
- Notes: Operated commercially as passenger ship for the Hamburg America Line 1874-1894.

General characteristics
- Type: Passenger ship
- Tonnage: 3,609 Gross register tons
- Length: 360.3 ft (109.8 m)
- Beam: 41 ft (12 m)
- Propulsion: Steam
- Speed: 13 knots
- Complement: 115

The Suevia was a passenger steamship built for the Hamburg America Line in 1874. It was assigned to transatlantic crossings between Hamburg, Germany and New York City, USA and played a role in German immigration to the United States.

The Suevia had accommodation for 100 first-class, 70 second-class and 600 third-class passengers. It had two masts and reached a speed of 13 knots. In 1884 it got new steam boilers and served for the Hamburg America Line 10 more years until 1894. In 1896 it was sold to Schiaffino, Nyer & Siges in Algeria and renamed Quatre Amis. After it stranded near Antwerp in 1898 it was scrapped in Marseille.

== Collision ==
On 13 April 1889, during a dense fog, the Hamburg Line steamship Suevia ran into the pilot-boat Commodore Bateman, No. 11, and sank her off Georges Bank, Cape Cod. Pilot John Handran and the cook Henry Halford were drowned trying to escape the sinking boat. Others on the pilot-boat were saved and taken on board the Suevia.

== See also ==
- Soren Sorensen Adams - a Danish-American inventor and manufacturer who immigrated to the United States on the Suevia in 1883.
- Carl Eytel – a German-American artist who immigrated to the United States aboard the Suevia in 1885.
