= Ellwood Walter (businessman) =

American insurance businessman

- Born: Ellwood Walter; August 16, 1803; Philadelphia, Pennsylvania, U.S.
- Died: May 7, 1877 (aged 73); Bronx, New York, U.S.
- Occupations: Insurance, underwriting, marine insurance

Ellwood Walter (August 16, 1803 – May 7, 1877) was president of the Mercantile Mutual Insurance Company in New York City for 28 years. The Mercantile Mutual Insurance Company was organized in April 1844. He was also secretary of the New York Board of Marine Underwriters since 1849.

== Early life ==
Born in Philadelphia, Pennsylvania to a Quaker family. In his early life, he was an editor of a weekly newspaper, The Ariel: A Literary and Critical Gazette, published in Philadelphia.

== Career ==
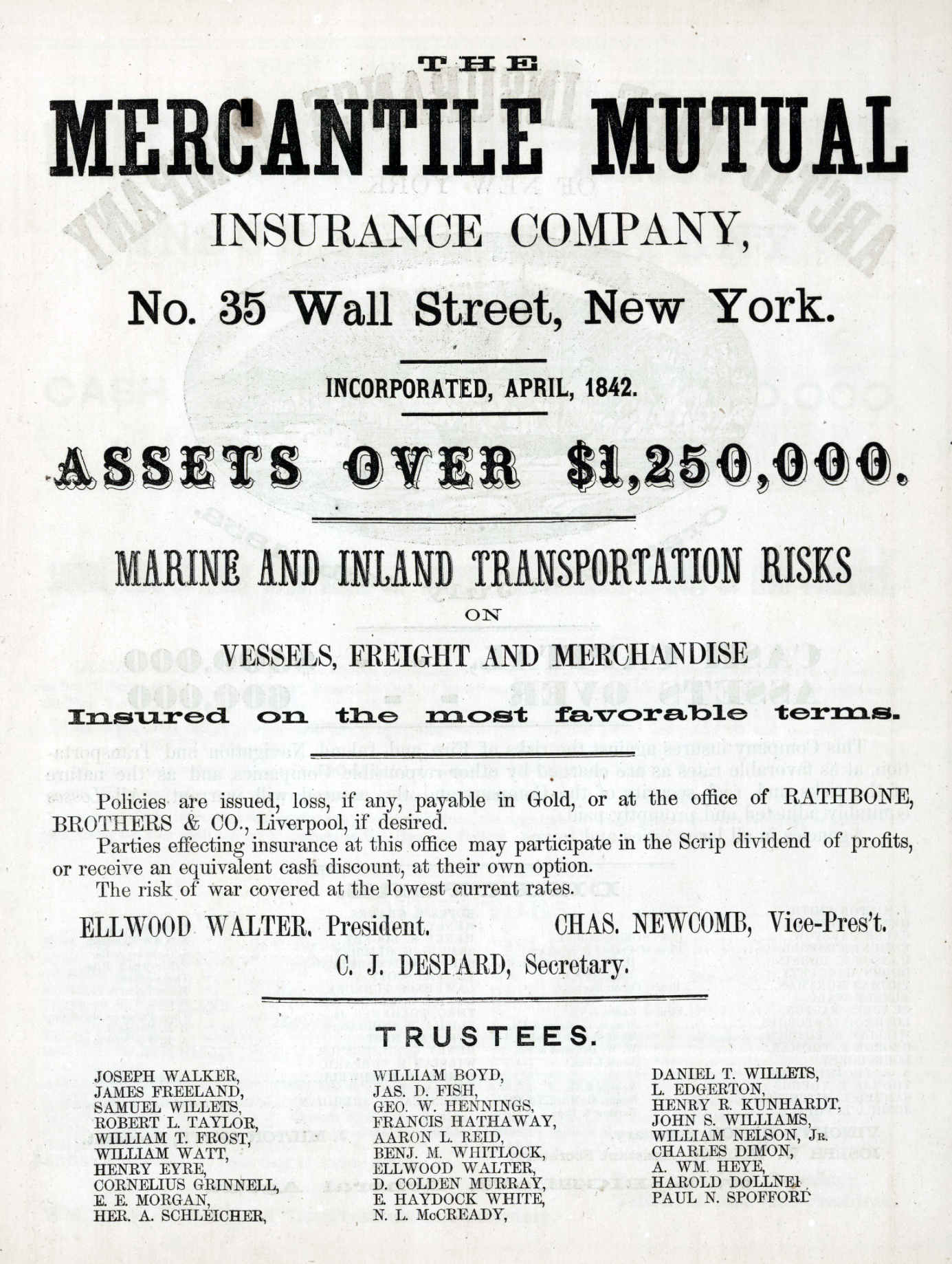
The Mercantile Mutual Insurance Company

In 1827 Walter started and edited a newspaper in Philadelphia which was a weekly.

By 1845 Walter was secretary of the Mercantile Mutual Insurance Company in New York. In 1847 he became a vice president, and in 1853 he became its president. Walter had been associated with the Mercantile Mutual Insurance Company for 28 years. Walter was secretary of the New York Board of Marine Underwriters.

The New York pilot-boat Ellwood Walter, No. 7 was named after Walter. The ship carried cargo between Boston Massachusetts and New York.

In October 1861, Walter became a trustee of the Nautical School for the harbor of New York.

On May 14, 1871, Walter was elected as vice-president of the New York Seamen's Association. In 1876, there was an act to authorize the transfer of the property of the New York Seamen's Association to the American Seamen's Friend Society and to dissolve the New York Seamen's Association.

Walter was described as a man of "distinguished presence" and "great personal dignity" who had for his time "considerable wealth". Walter was one of the leading members of the Quaker mercantile community.

== Death ==
On May 7, 1877, at the age of 75, Walter died at his residence in Englewood, New Jersey. He was buried at the Quaker Cemetery in Brooklyn, New York.

== Post death ==
The Mercantile Mutual Insurance company went out of business in 1880.
