= Mary A. Williams =

New York Pilot boat

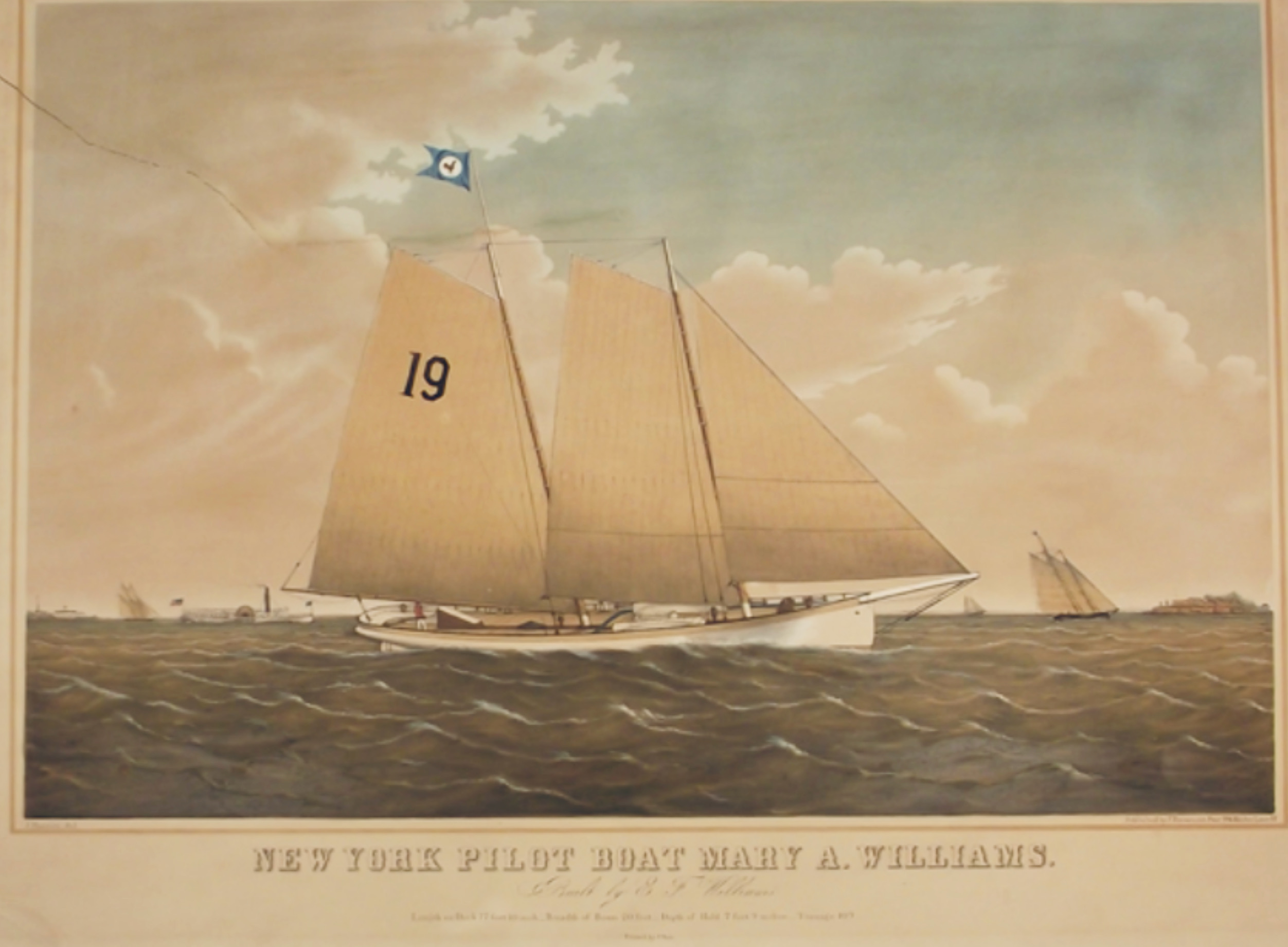
- New York pilot boat Mary A. Williams, No. 19, built by Edward F. Williams.

History

United States
- Name: Mary A. Williams
- Namesake: Mary Ann Williams, wife of Edward F. Williams
- Owner: New York Pilots
- Operator: H. Burnett, John Wolff
- Builder: Edward F. Williams shipyard
- Launched: 28 January 1861
- Out of service: 1 February 1896
- Fate: Sold

General characteristics
- Class & type: schooner
- Tonnage: 50-tons TM
- Length: 76 ft 0 in (23.16 m)
- Beam: 21 ft 0 in (6.40 m)
- Depth: 7 ft 0 in (2.13 m)
- Propulsion: Sail

The Mary A. Williams was a 19th-century Sandy Hook pilot boat, built in 1861 by the shipbuilder Edward F. Williams in Greenpoint, Brooklyn, for a group of New York pilots. She was named Mary Ann Williams after the wife of the builder. She survived the Great Blizzard of 1888. In the age of steam, the Mary A. Williams was sold in 1896.

== Construction and service ==
New York pilot boat Mary A. Williams was built in 1861 for the New York and Sandy Hook pilots. She was launched on January 28, 1861, from the Edward F. Williams shipyard, at Greenpoint, Brooklyn. She was 77 feet in length, 19 feet 6 inches in beam, 7 feet and 9 inches in hold (depth), measuring 57.64 tons or (106 tons register). She was named Mary Ann Williams after the wife of the builder, Edward F. Williams.

The Mary A. Williams was registered with the Record of American and Foreign Shipping from 1876 to 1900, as a Pilot Schooner, with the New York Pilots as owners and Pilots H. Burnett and John Wolff as the Masters. She was 77 in length, 18.5 in breadth of beam, 7.9 in depth of hold, 55-tons and built in 1861.

The Mary A. Williams, No. 19 was one of only twenty-one New York pilot boats existing 1860.

On May 30, 1876, fifteen miles from the Sandy Hook lightship, the Mary A. Williams picked up John S. Graham, who was on the bark Eliza McLaughlin. Graham was driven to jump overboard from the vessel to escape bad treatment from the captain and mate. John Wolff, the pilot-boat captain, took a yawl to reach Graham and carried him on board the Williams.

In the March Great Blizzard of 1888, the Mary A. Williams was one of 17 vessels out on pilot duty at the time of the storm. She survived the storm with no incident.

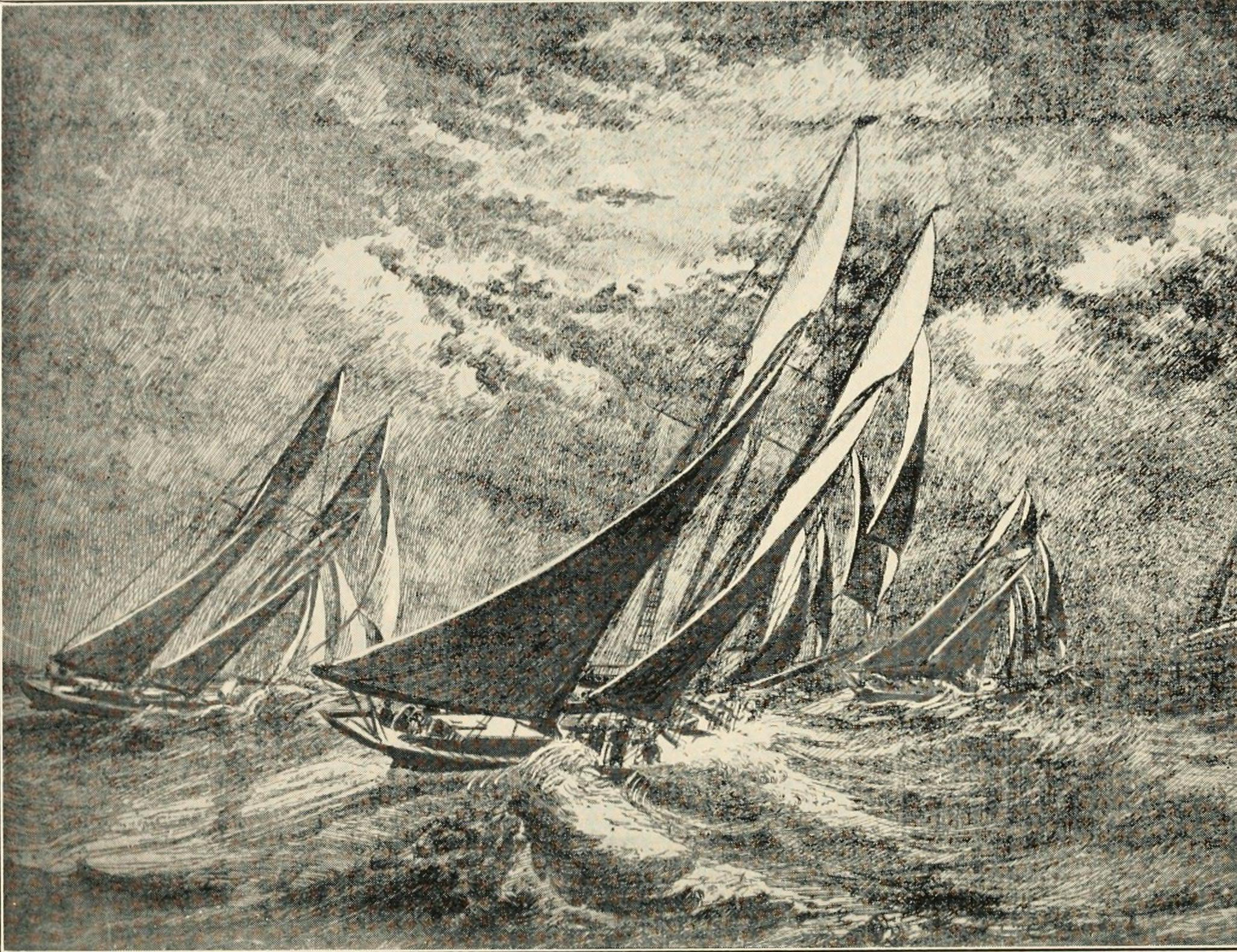
Pilot lore; Pilot boats Williams, Bateman, and Blunt

In May 1890, Pilot boats Mary A. Williams, William H. Bateman and Edmund Blunt raced and competed for honors to reach several ocean liners coming into port off Sandy Hook. The North German Lloyd steamship, Rhein, was in reach. The racing pilot boats raced to her side. The Bateman won the race by less than a dozen yards.

The New York pilot boat Mary A. Williams, No. 19 was rebuilt in October 1890 from the keel up at the C. & R. Poillon shipyard. The changes made were said to equal if not excel any boat in the New York pilot-boat fleet.

== End of service ==
On 1 February 1896, the New York Pilots discarded sixteen sailboats and moved them to the Erie Basin in Brooklyn. They were replaced with steam pilot boats. The Mary A. Williams was sold for $5,500.

== See also ==
- List of Northeastern U. S. Pilot Boats
- Pilot boat
