= Edward F. Williams (shipbuilder) =

Early American shipbuilder

Edward F. Williams Shipyard
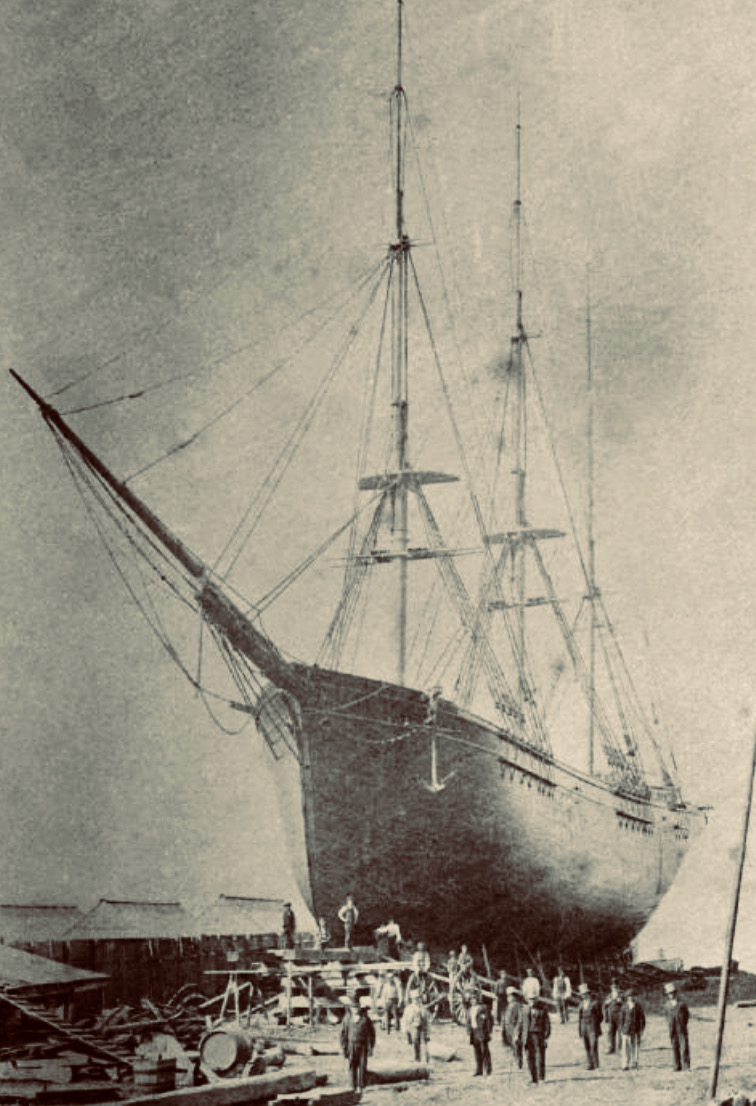
- The Williams Shipyard.
- Born: March 25, 1826; New York City, US
- Died: September 19, 1902 (aged 76); New Providence, New Jersey, US
- Occupation: Shipbuilder
- Spouse: Mary Ann Dissoway
- Children: 8

Edward Francis Williams (March 25, 1826 – September 19, 1902), was a 19th-century shipbuilder. He apprenticed under his father Jabez Williams. Edward F. Williams built his own shipyard, building clipper ships and eleven Sandy Hook pilot boats, some of the finest boats in the fleet. He was the first president of the Greenpoint Savings Bank. Williams died in New Providence, New Jersey, in 1902.

== Early life ==
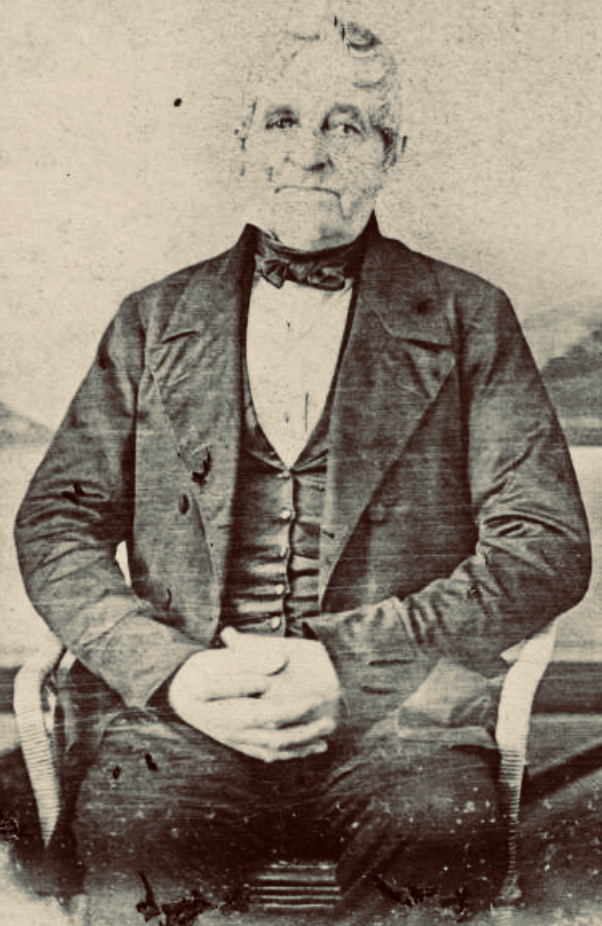
Jabez Williams (1788-1870).

Edward F. Williams was born on March 25, 1826, in New York City. His father Jabez Williams (1788-1870), born in Stonington, Connecticut, was a pioneer and prominent shipbuilder in New York. Edward married Mary A. Dissoway and had 8 children. One child, Edward A. Williams was Assistant Secretary and Clerk in the Greenpoint Savings Bank.

Some of the vessels Jabez Williams built were the Angelique (1825), Catharine (1829), Warsaw (1830), Mary Frances (1831), Union (1833), Ohio (1834), Argo (1836), Eagle (1836), pilot boat Joseph N. Lord (1840), and Princeton (1848).

In 1845, Jabez Williams moved his shipyard across the East River to Williamsburg at the foot of Clinton Street. It was called the Jabez Williams shipyard and sometimes referred to as the Jabez Williams & Son because he worked with his son, John T. Williams (1819-1879). He moved again in 1848 to Greenpoint, Brooklyn where he purchased land to build a shipyard. John T. Williams remained a partner with his father until 1854, when he became one of the oldest members of the New York Stock Exchange.

== Career ==
Edward F. Williams apprenticed under his father at the age of 14, and soon started his own shipyard. The Edward F. Williams shipyard was in Greenpoint at the foot of Quay Street.

In the 1850s and 1860s Williams built the following ships:

- Eclipse (1852) 269-ton schooner
- S. J. Moye (1852) 319-ton schooner
- Tennessee (1853) 348-ton schooner
- F. Kickerson (1854) 280-ton schooner
- Monticello (1854) 1,500-ton steamship
- Ricot (1855) 328-ton bark
- Clara Haxall (1855) 390-ton clipper-bark
- William H. Gilliland (1855) schooner
- Almana (1856) 700-ton steamship
- Lexington (1857) bark 350-ton bark
- Nettle Merrill (1859) clipper schooner
- J. T. Williams (1860) 700-ton steamship
- Fah Kee (1862) 745-ton steamship
- Henrietta (1863) bark
- Rebecca (1863) bark

Between 1850 and 1865, Williams built twelve Sandy Hook pilot boats. The pilot boat Edward F. Williams was named in recognition of the shipbuilder.

- Independence (1837)
- Jabez Williams (1850)
- Ellwood Walter (1853)
- Edmund Blunt (1858)
- Fannie (1860)
- Mary A. Williams (1861)
- Mary E. Fish (1861)
- Edward F. Williams (1863)
- William Bell (1863)
- Edmund Driggs (1864)
- William Bell II (1865)
- A. T. Stewart (1865)

=== Post Civil War ===
When William's father died in 1870, he inherited what had been a prosperous business. Williams left the firm after the Civil War, at the decline of the ship building business and went into the lumber and banking business. Froom 1873 to 1880, he was president of the Greenpoint Savings bank. His brother, David F. Williams, was president of the Republican General Committee. In 1881, after living in Greenpoint for 31 years, Williams moved to Summit, New Jersey.

=== Alabama Claims ===
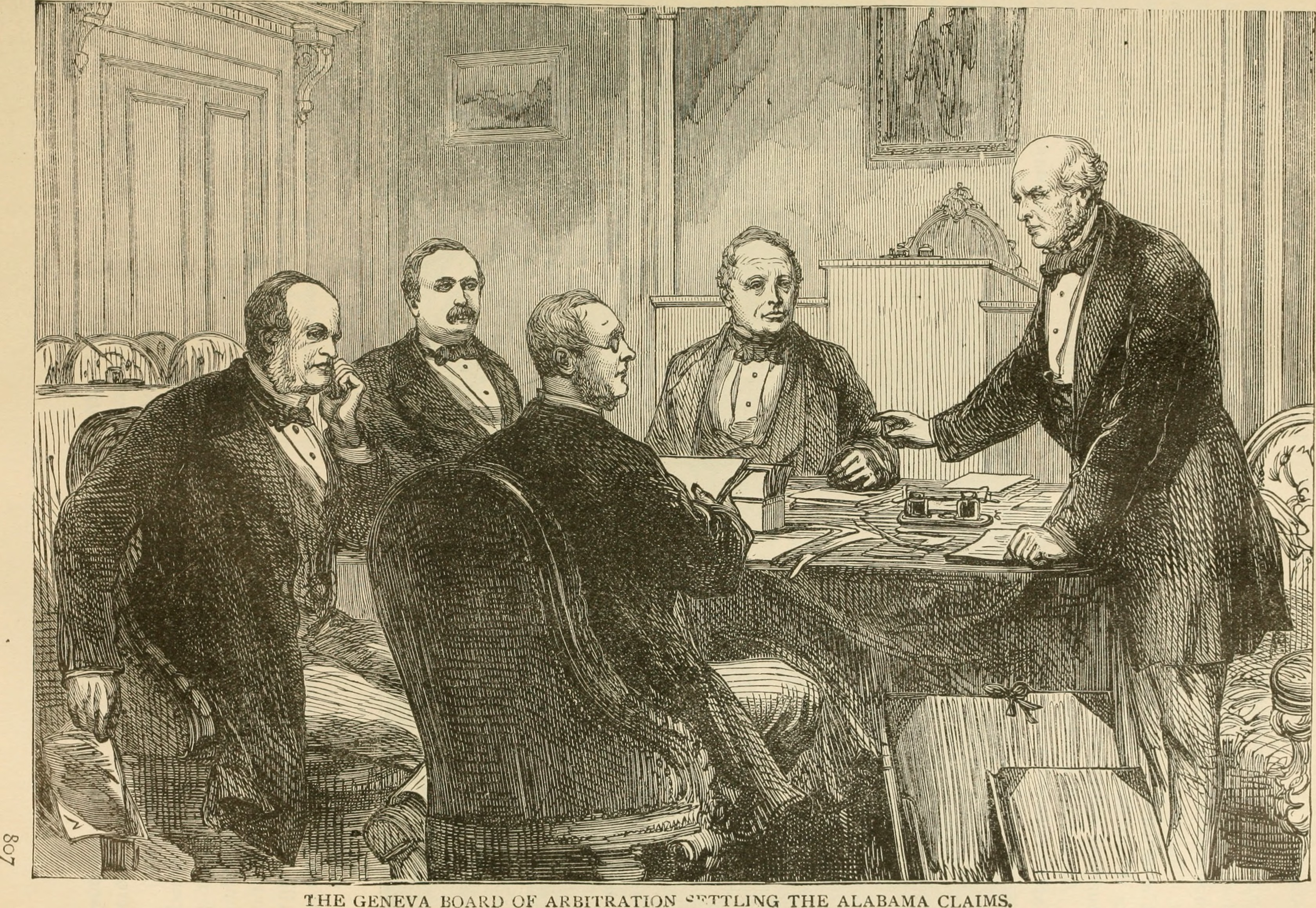
The Geneva Board of Arbitration settling the Alabama Claims.

On February 23, 1883, Williams testified in a Court of Commissioners of Alabama Claims for compensation for the loss of the pilot boat William Bell during the American Civil War, which was petitioned by Joseph Henderson, John Van Deusen, William Anderson, and James Callahan. At the deposition, Williams said that he was the shipbuilder of the pilot boat William Bell, age 57, living in Summit, New Jersey. He went on to say that he built twelve Sandy Hook pilot boats and that the William Bell was an "extraordinarily expensive boat to build in every respect; her decks were all trimmed with mahogany; she was copper-fastened to the top of her rail; from keel to rail; her ballast was all cast and fitted between the frames."

The final award, made on June 5, 1883, gave compensation of $9,289.59 to Henderson, who owned 5/16 shares in the William Bell and James Callahan, $9,410.14, who owned 5/16 shares, for a total award of $18,699.73. Although this was less than the $24,000.00 amount claimed, it was a reasonable settlement.

== Death ==
Edward F. Williams died, at age 77, on September 19, 1902, in New Providence, New Jersey. His interment was at the Green-Wood Cemetery.

== See also ==
- List of Northeastern U. S. Pilot Boats
- List of clipper ships
- List of schooners
- Packet boat
