= Conrad Freitag =

American marine painter

- Born: January 1, 1843; Germany
- Died: October 26, 1894 (aged 51); Brooklyn, New York, US
- Resting place: Middle Village, Queens, New York
- Known for: marine art
- Style: oil

Conrad Freitag (1843–October 26, 1894) was a German American marine artist from Brooklyn, New York. He was best known for his portraits of New York pilot boats. Freitag's works were exhibited at the National Academy and the Brooklyn Art Association.

== Early life ==
Freitag was born in Germany in 1843.

== Career ==
During the American Civil War Freitag enlisted in the Fourteenth Regiment. He was honorably discharged in June 1865. He returned to convalesce in New York where he painted a scene of the Spotsylvania battle, which is when his art career began.

His works were exhibited at the National Academy and the Brooklyn Art Association in the 1870s and 1880s. He was best known for his works of New York pilot boats.

== Death ==
Freitag died at the residence of his brother, Philip Freitag, at 488 North Second Street, on October 26, 1894, in Brooklyn, New York.
