= Sandy Hook Pilots =

Mariners guiding ships near New York Bay

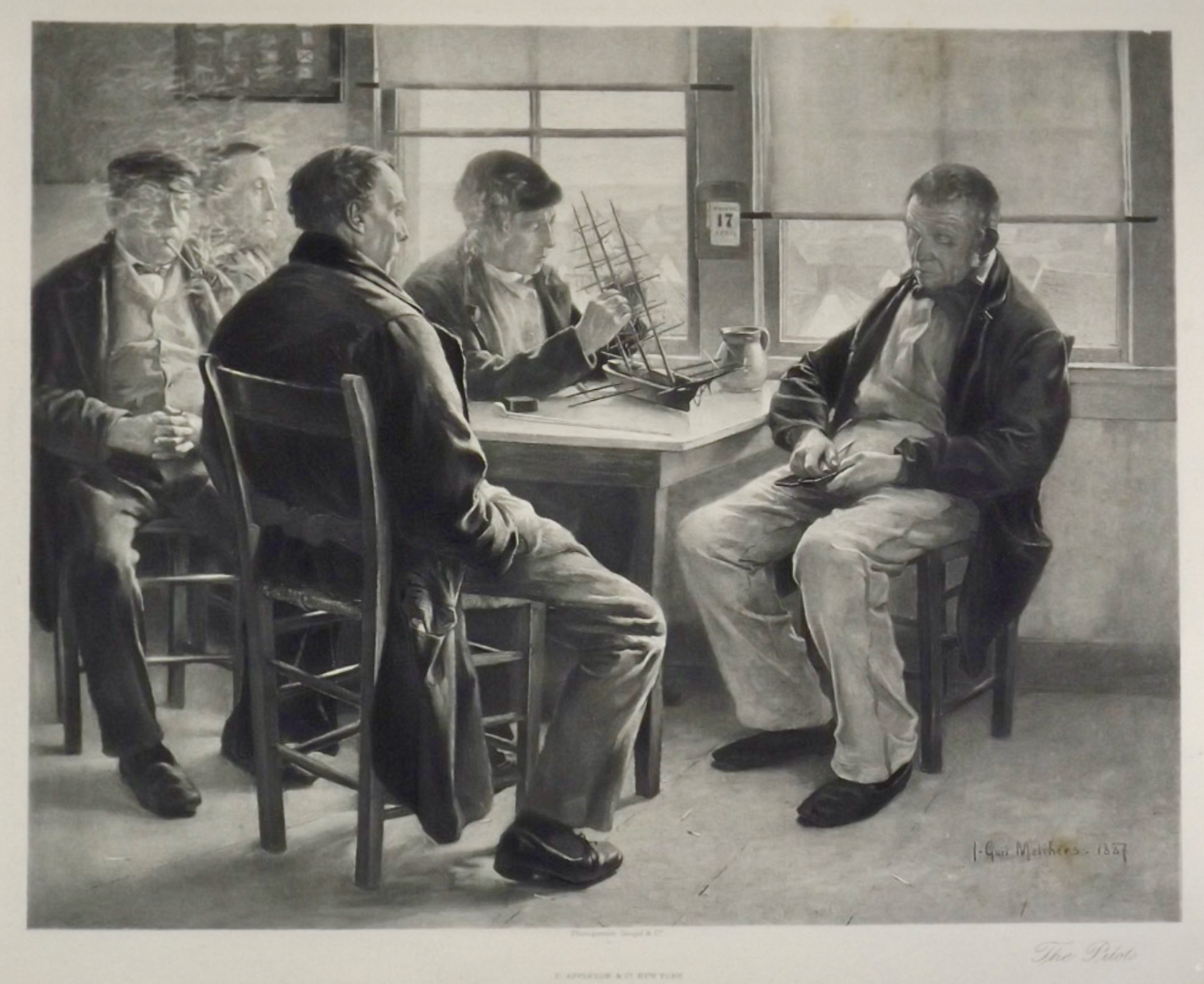
- Group of Sandy Hook Pilots
- Nickname: Maritime pilot or Harbor pilot
- Named after: Sandy Hook, barrier spit
- Formation: 1694
- Founded at: New York City
- Headquarters: Staten Island
- Location: New York/New Jersey, US
- Origins: A group of men to ensure safe passage of ships into the New York Harbor
- Services: Piloting
- Affiliations: Sandy Hook Pilots Association

The Sandy Hook Pilots are state-licensed maritime pilots who provide pilotage for regulated oceangoing vessels entering and departing the Port of New York and New Jersey. The pilots are members of the United New York Sandy Hook Pilots' Benevolent Association and the United New Jersey Sandy Hook Pilots' Benevolent Association, two state-based organizations that operate a common pilotage service from Staten Island. New Jersey law defines a Sandy Hook pilot as a licensed maritime pilot who is a member of one of those two Associations. The service takes its name from Sandy Hook, the New Jersey peninsula at the southern entrance to Lower New York Bay. The colonial government of New York regulated pilotage at Sandy Hook as early as 1694, when the Assembly enacted a law providing for pilots and a boat near the Hook to assist vessels bound for the port. The modern cooperative arrangement developed much later: in 1895 the New York and New Jersey Sandy Hook pilots joined into a single economic organization, ending decades of direct competition for arriving ships. The Associations maintain a year-round offshore pilot station at the approaches to Ambrose Channel. Either the Pilot Boat New York or New Jersey serves as the station vessel, with smaller launches used to transfer pilots between the station vessel and arriving or departing ships.

== History ==
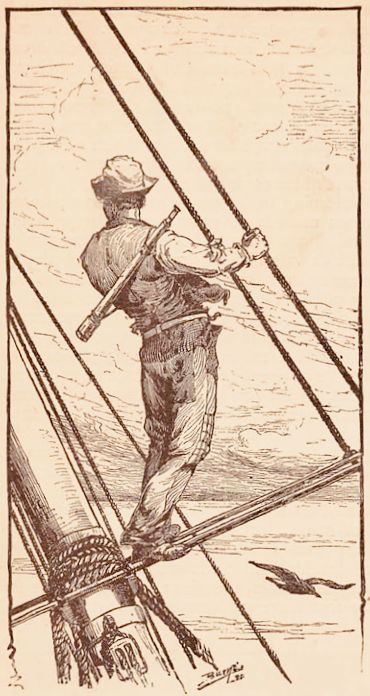
Pilot on the lookout.

=== Colonial origins ===
Before the construction of a deep-water dredged entrance channel, large vessels entering New York Harbor had to cross a shifting complex of shoals and natural channels extending between Sandy Hook and the Rockaway shore, historically known as the Bar of Sandy Hook. The bar was formed by sediment and coastal processes, and its channels changed with storms, tides, and currents. The pilots who specialized in guiding vessels through this approach consequently became known as Sandy Hook or "Bar" pilots. On March 9, 1694, the Assembly of the Colony of New York passed An Act for Settling Pilotage for all Vessels that shall come within Sandy Hook. The law followed an easterly storm that had shifted banks at the harbor entrance and provided for four men with a boat near Sandy Hook to assist vessels bound for New York as far as the Narrows. Colonial and, later, state legislation continued to regulate pilot licensing and pilotage. In 1784 New York again provided by statute for appointment of branch pilots for the Port of New York. The federal government preserved this state role after independence. Section 4 of the first federal Lighthouse Act, approved August 7, 1789, provided that pilots in the bays, inlets, rivers, harbors and ports of the United States would continue to be regulated in conformity with state law unless Congress provided otherwise. That basic federal-state division remains reflected in modern federal pilotage law.

=== Nineteenth-century regulation and competition ===
New Jersey formalized a new regulatory structure for pilots in 1837 by creating a state Board of Commissioners of Pilotage and a competing New Jersey pilotage system. For much of the nineteenth century, New York-licensed and New Jersey-licensed pilots competed for the same arriving ships. In 1845 a group of New York marine underwriters created another competing pilot service. Because the underwriters could influence whether ships using particular pilots were insured, the group gained substantial leverage over pilotage practices. New York formalized a new regulatory structure in 1853. The present Board of Commissioners of Pilots of the State of New York traces its creation to Chapter 467 of the Laws of 1853 and today retains responsibility for pilot selection, licensing, examinations, renewals and casualty investigations. The nineteenth-century competition nevertheless continued at sea. Pilot schooners cruised well offshore looking for inbound vessels, and several boats could race for the same ship because the first pilot aboard generally secured the assignment. The competition helped drive the development of fast, seaworthy pilot schooners, but it also exposed pilots and crews to significant risk from weather and increasingly fast steamships.

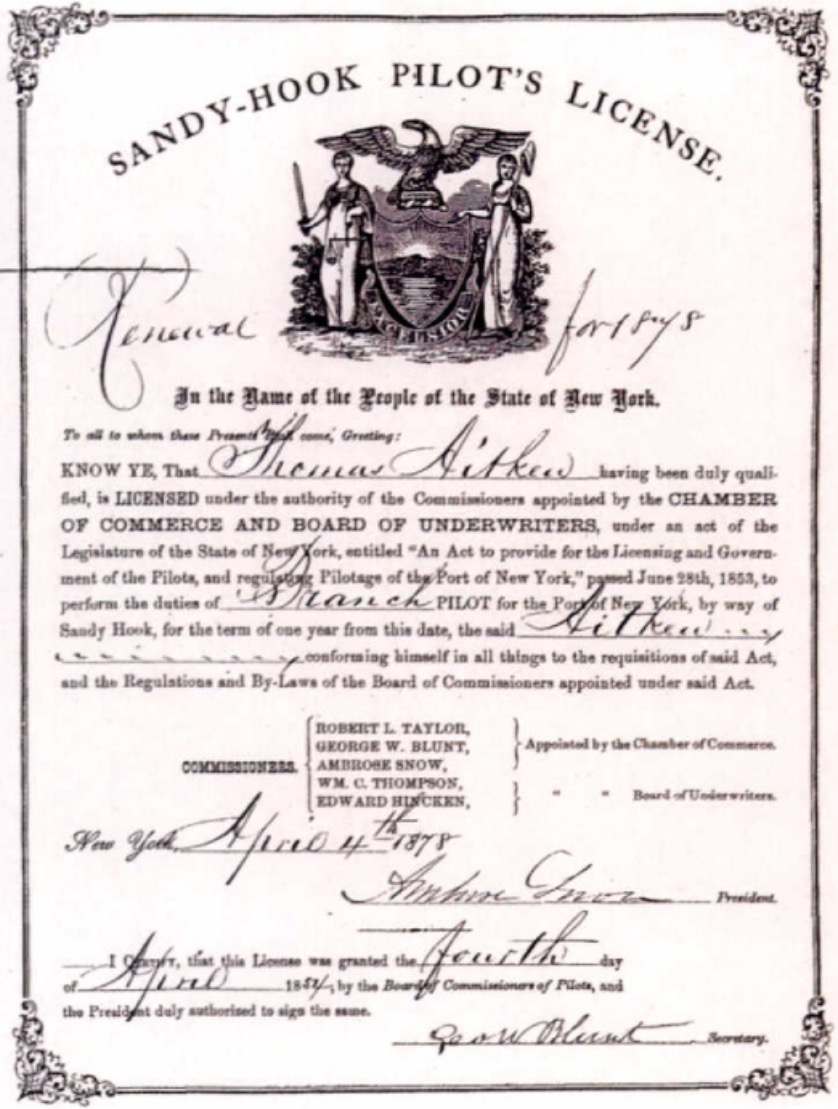
Sandy Hook Pilot's License (1854).

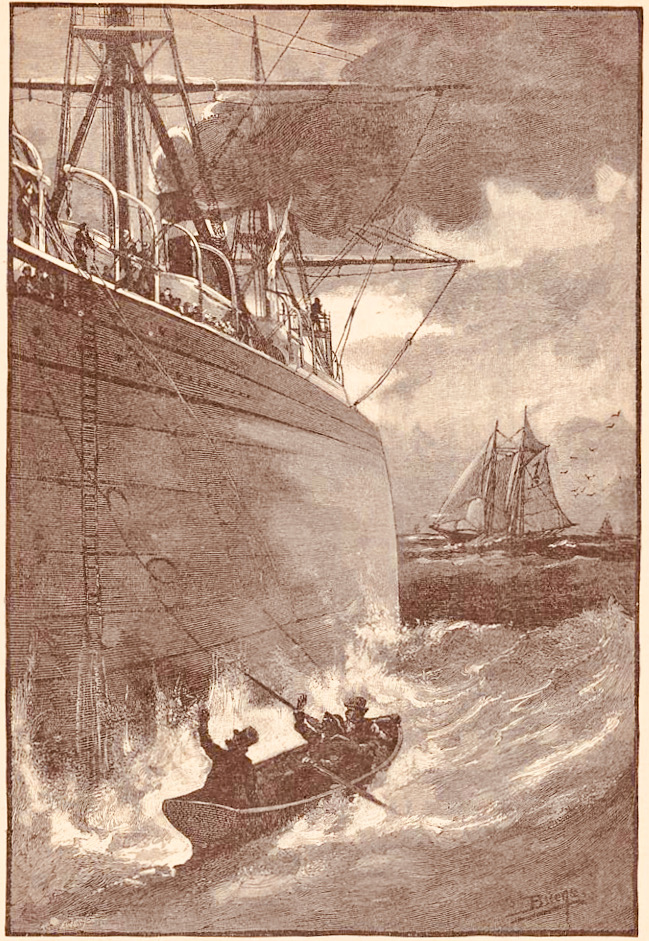
Pilot boarding a steamship.

=== 1895 reorganization and the offshore station system ===
In 1895 the New York and New Jersey Sandy Hook pilots joined into one economic organization. The arrangement replaced the race-for-ships system with a cooperative service in which assignments and earnings were handled collectively, while the pilots remained licensed and regulated by their respective states. The two state associations remained legally distinct; modern New Jersey law continues to identify the United New Jersey and United New York Sandy Hook Pilots' Benevolent Associations separately. The reorganization coincided with major changes in the harbor entrance. Congress authorized a new deep-water entrance through the East Channel in 1899; the channel was renamed Ambrose Channel in 1900 and was progressively dredged for the larger steamships then entering the port. The project was completed to its planned 40-foot depth and 2,000-foot width in 1914. As Ambrose became the principal ocean approach, the Sandy Hook station boat became a fixed operational base near the channel entrance from which pilots could be transferred to and from ships. Contemporary accounts show that the cooperative system was well established by the 1920s. A 1926 Popular Mechanics article described the pilots as sharing expenses and earnings through a cooperative association and working on a rotating schedule. Pilots were transferred between the pilot vessel and ships by open yawls, which were maneuvered alongside so the pilot could climb a rope or pilot ladder to the ship.

=== Twentieth century ===
Sailing pilot boats gradually gave way to steam and motor vessels, while the small yawls used for ship transfers remained in service into the twentieth century. During the Second World War, power launches replaced the yawls. William Wertenbaker's 1968 history reported that from 1941 to 1945 the Sandy Hook pilots and their pilot boats became part of the United States Coast Guard service; the pilots also handled the sharply increased traffic associated with wartime convoys. The pilot boats also participated in maritime emergencies. During the September 1934 Morro Castle disaster off the New Jersey coast, the Sandy Hook pilot boat assisted the Coast Guard cutter Tampa and retained several survivors taken from the burning liner. By the 1960s the basic modern operating pattern was recognizable: a large station vessel remained offshore near Ambrose, smaller launches carried pilots between the station vessel and ships, and a shore-based boat transported pilots and supplies between Staten Island and the station. Wertenbaker's 1968 account also distinguished the Sandy Hook "bar pilots," who navigated vessels through the harbor approaches and channels, from docking pilots who specialized in berthing and unberthing ships.

=== September 11 and later modernization ===
Following the September 11, 2001 attacks, the then-current pilot boat New York was used as a command and communications platform during the marine evacuation of Lower Manhattan. The New York Board of Commissioners of Pilots later reported that the vessel served as a command center for communicating with vessels evacuating people from Manhattan. The same vessel was used again after Superstorm Sandy in 2012, when it assisted the Coast Guard and U.S. Army Corps of Engineers in surveying damage in the port. In 2019, the Sandy Hook Pilot Association acquired the former oil-spill response vessel Maine Responder for conversion into a new station boat. After rebuilding at Feeney Shipyard in Kingston, New York, the 208-foot vessel entered service as the new pilot boat New York in 2022, replacing the previous vessel of the same name after nearly five decades of service.

== Current operations ==
=== Regulation and pilotage districts ===
State pilotage remains compulsory for categories of commercial vessels specified by state law. New York Navigation Law section 88 requires foreign vessels and American vessels under register entering or departing the Port of New York by Sandy Hook, Sands Point or Execution Rocks to take an appropriately licensed Sandy Hook Pilot, subject to statutory exceptions. New Jersey similarly regulates maritime pilotage through the New Jersey Maritime Pilot and Docking Pilot Commission. The Sandy Hook Pilots’ Association provides appropriately licensed pilots for regulated vessels in the Port of New York and New Jersey and, as required by state law, for the Hudson River, East River, Atlantic City, Jamaica Bay and Long Island Sound.

=== Ambrose Pilot Station and fleet ===
For vessels approaching from the Atlantic, the Sandy Hook Pilots maintain a pilot vessel on station throughout the year at the Ambrose Pilot Station. Either New York or New Jersey serves as the station vessel. Pilots normally embark or disembark from ships using 53-foot aluminum launches operated from the station boat. As of 2025, the New York State pilot system listed the Sandy Hook vessels New York, New Jersey, Romer, America, Phantom, Wanderer and Yankee in New York Harbor service; the former 65-foot Sandy Hook was listed as decommissioned. The Sandy Hook fleet page describes New York and New Jersey as the two station boats, four America-class launches as pilot-transfer vessels, Romer as a larger transport vessel and a rigid-hull inflatable boat used primarily for rescue work.

=== Apprenticeship and licensing ===
Sandy Hook Pilots qualify through a lengthy apprenticeship and state licensing process. The New York Board of Commissioners of Pilots approves apprenticeships and administers examinations for original licenses, route extensions, and annual renewals. The Board states that Sandy Hook apprentices initially work aboard pilot launches and station boats and must ride more than 1,000 vessels entering and departing the Port of New York and New Jersey as part of their training.

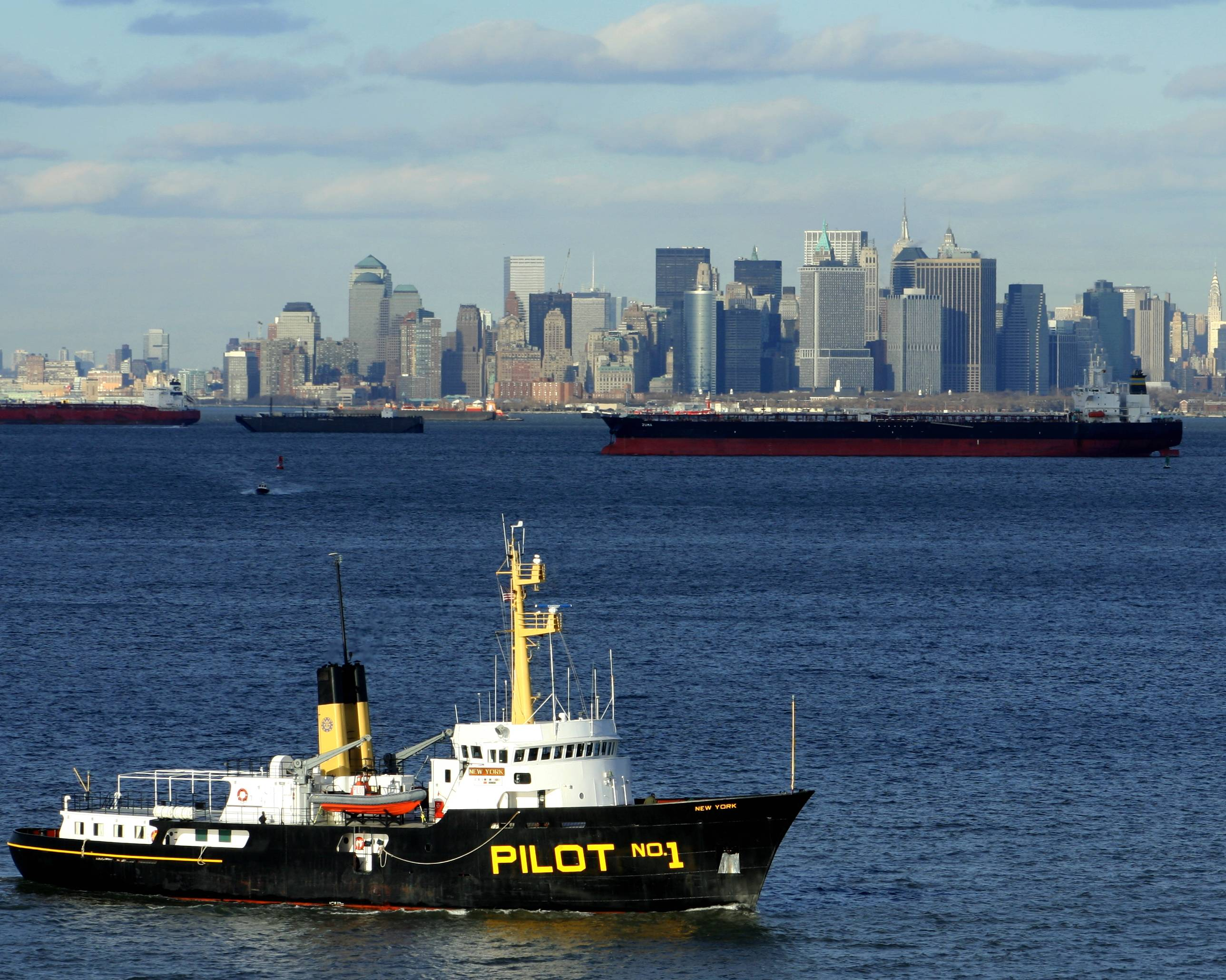
Pilot boat in Upper New York Bay

== See also ==
- Maritime pilot
- Ambrose Channel
- Port of New York and New Jersey
- New York Board of Commissioners of Pilots
- Sandy Hook
