= Theophilus Beebe =

Sandy Hook Pilot

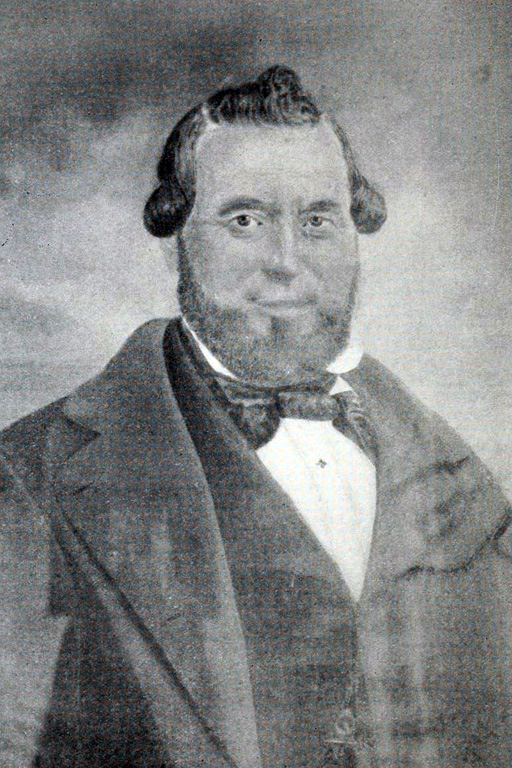
- Born: October 19, 1800; New London, Connecticut, US
- Died: January 9, 1867 (aged 66); Jersey City, New Jersey, US
- Occupation: Harbor pilot
- Known for: First New Jersey licensed pilot
- Spouse: Elizabeth Van Gelder
- Children: 8

Theophilus Beebe III (October 19, 1800 – January 9, 1867) was a 19th-century American Sandy Hook Pilot. He was the first pilot to receive his pilot's license under the New Jersey Pilots' Commission in 1837. Beebe served as pilot on the pilot boat Thomas H Smith.

== Early life ==
Theophilus Beebe was born on October 19, 1880, in New London, Connecticut. He was the son of Theophilus D. Beebe (1753–1837) and Lucy Monroe (1755–1830), who was a direct descendant of President James Monroe.

Beebe married Elizabeth Van Gelder (1804–1866) in Brooklyn, New York in 1825 and had eight children.

His nephew, George W. Beebe, was a license pilot for forty years. He was one of the first presidents of the New York Pilots' Association. He was the author of the "Beebe's Tides and Complete River Guide of New York Harbor." George died on April 8, 1931, at the age of sixty-seven from heart disease.

== Career ==
Beebe was a fisherman by trade and ran a small fishing smack out of Fulton Fish Market, New York City by way of the Sandy Hook, until the State of New Jersey built him a pilot boat.

On February 25, 1837, following a series of shipping disasters, Captain Theophilus Beebe received the first branch pilot's license from the New Jersey Pilot's Commission. This license covered the ports of Perth Amboy, Newark, and New York Bay. For the first time there was competition between the two states. He was then commissioned by the governor of New Jersey to procure men qualified to become pilots. His brothers, Lyman Beebe and Clinton Beebe, received their pilot's licenses at this time.

Theophilus Beebe served as pilot on the pilot boat Thomas H Smith, along with Richard Brown, John Ward, Benjamin Chase, Henry Beebe, and Daniel C. Chapman.

== Death ==
Theophilus Beebe died, at age 66, of heart disease on the pilot boat Mystic, on January 9, 1867, in Jersey City, New Jersey.

== See also ==
- List of Northeastern U. S. Pilot Boats
