= David Carll (pilot boat) =

New York Pilot boat

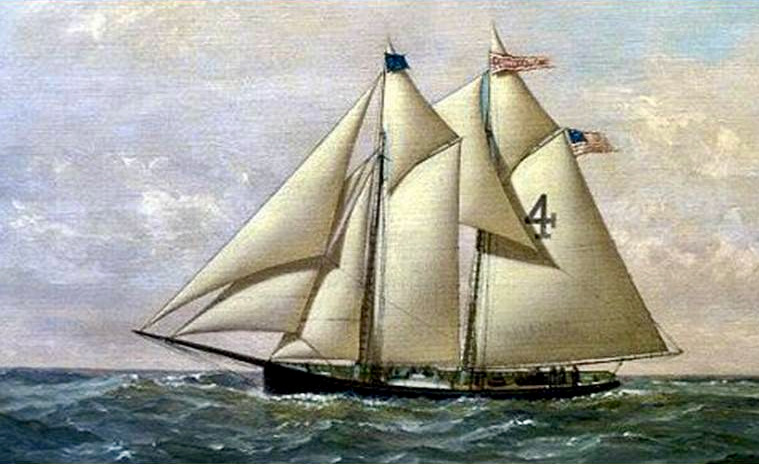
- Pilot Boat David Carll, No. 4; painting by Conrad Freitag.

History

United States
- Name: David Carll
- Namesake: David Carll, shipbuilder
- Owner: Frederick Nelson; Allen M. Beebe; Edward P. Nichols; Jacob Van Name Brothers (1878-1897); John E. Kirwan (1898-1900)
- Operator: A. Hawkins (1878-1886); Edward P. Nichols (1887-1890); Edgar T. Somers (1887 to 1894); Leonard (1895-1897); John E. Kirwan (1898-1900)
- Builder: David Carll shipyard
- Cost: $12,000
- Launched: 8 November 1885
- Out of service: 1 February 1896
- Fate: Sank

General characteristics
- Class & type: schooner
- Tonnage: 66-tons TM
- Length: 77 ft 5 in (23.60 m)
- Beam: 21 ft 5 in (6.53 m)
- Depth: 8 ft 4 in (2.54 m)
- Propulsion: Sail

The David Carll was a 19th-century pilot boat, built in 1885 at the David Carll shipyard in City Island, New York. She was named in honor of David Carll, a well-known City Island shipbuilder. The David Carll was considered to be among the fastest schooners in the fleet. She was built to replace the Mary E. Fish that was run down and sank by the schooner Frank Harrington in 1885. She was one of the pilot boats that survived the Great Blizzard of 1888. The David Carll was lost at sea in 1893.

== Construction and service ==
=== David Carll oyster boat ===
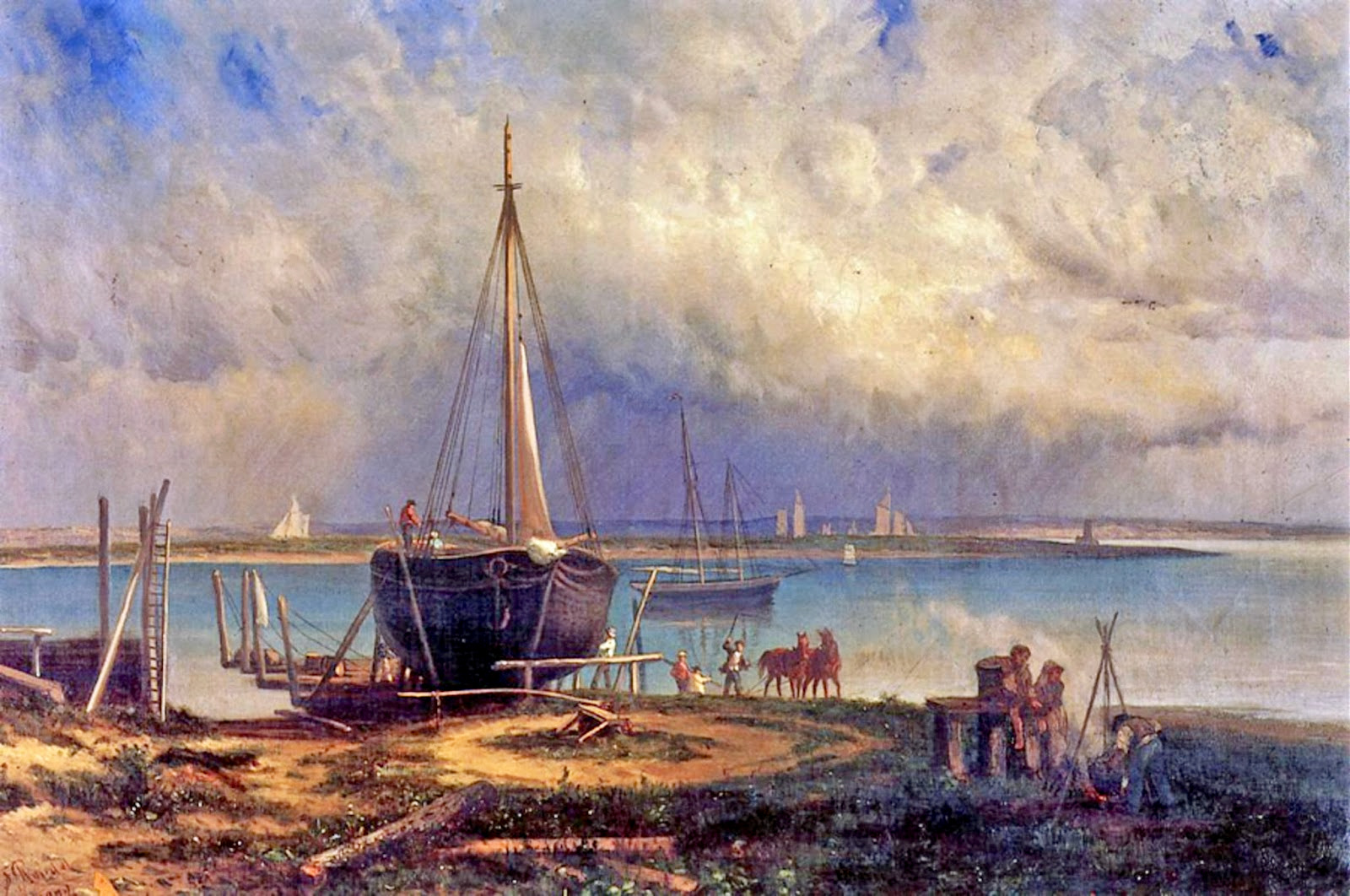
Painting near David Carll's Shipyard with view Of City Island by Frederick Rondel.

The first David Carll was built in 1876 at City Island, New York by David Carll, for Jacob Van Name Brothers of Oyster House, Staten Island, New York. Her owners were Pilots Allen M. Beebe, Edward Nichols, and Frederick Nelson.

She was launched on December 5, 1876, at City Island, commanded by Captain Charles Hawkins. She is owned by W. H. Van Name and was employed in the oyster and fruit trade.

The Oyster schooner David Carll was later known as the Blackbird. Captain Sam Holt once piloted the Oyster schooner David Carll.

The David Carll was registered as a Schooner with the Record of American and Foreign Shipping, from 1878 to 1900. Through the twenty-two years she was registered, her ship masters changed. Her ship master was Chas. A. Hawkins (1878–1886); Edgar T. Somers (1887 to 1894); Leonard (1895–1897); and John E. Kirwan (1898–1900); her owners were Jacob Van Name (1878–1897) and John E. Kirwan (1898–1900); built in 1876 at the City Island, New York; and her hailing ports were the Port of New York (1878–1897) and Baltimore, Maryland (1898–1900). Her dimensions were 103 ft. in length; 27 ft. breadth of beam; 8.3 ft. depth; and 119-tons.

In 1907, the David Carl was still reported as sailing under the name Blackbird. She was purchased from Captain Luther Phillips of Cambridge, Massachusetts, for Captain Simmons, who once commanded the schooner William H. Van Name. The Blackbird was used for the Massachusetts Bay and coasting trade.

=== David Carll pilot boat ===
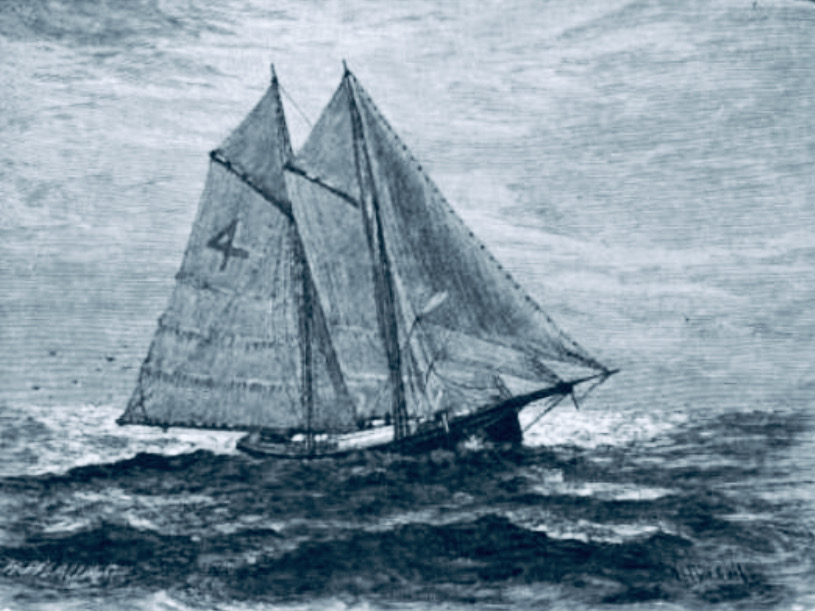
Pilot Boat David Carl, No. 4 at sea.

On November 8, 1885, four pilot owners entered into a contract to build a new Sandy Hook pilot boat with shipbuilder David Carll at City Island, when the Mary A. Fish, No. 4, was run down and sank by the schooner Frank Harrington. The pilots name the new pilot boat in honor of the shipbuilder David Carll. This was the second David Carll and one of the last efforts at the David Carll shipyard. The cost was $12,000. Her owners were Captain Denis Reardon, Jeremiah Reardon, William Maxwell, Robert G. Sylvester, Allan M. Beebe, Frank Nelson and Edward P. Nichols. They were veteran Sandy Hook pilots that lived in Brooklyn, with one exception. The David Carll started on her trail trip on November 5, 1885, from the bridge tower pier. She sailed down the bay and tested her speed with the pilot boat Centennial, No. 7, which was the fastest boat in the fleet. The David Carll beat the Centennial easily. Speeches were made by Brooklyn Major William J. Powell, Captain Denis Reardon and others.

She was registered as a Schooner with the Record of American and Foreign Shipping, from 1887 to 1900. Her ship masters were Edward Nichols (1887–1890) and Hawkins (1891–1893); built in 1885 at City Island, New York; and her hailing port was the Port of New York. Her dimensions were 77.5 ft. in length; 21.5 ft. breadth of beam; 8.4 ft. depth; 66-tons; and her masts were 73 ft and 71 ft; featuring a plum bow. On her mainsail was the large letter "4", that identified the boat as a Sandy Hook pilot boat; along with a pennant flag with the name David Carll.

In the March Great Blizzard of 1888, pilot boat David Carll, No, 4 was out on pilot duty after the storm. Pilot Edward Nichols of the David Carll, No. 4 reported that during the blizzard, Swert Petersen was washed overboard and drowned. Nichols came into port on the steamship Lydian Monarch. The pilot boat made it out safe but her yawls and port bulwarks were smashed inward.

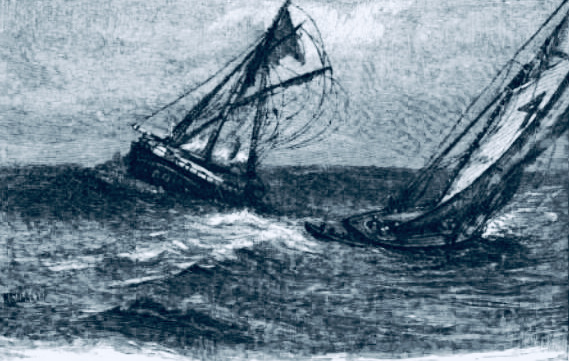
The pilot boat David Carll and bark Alice Roy.

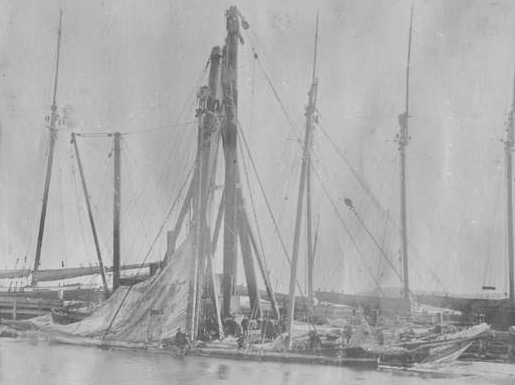
Pilot boat David Carll Raised at Stapleton, New York in 1893.

In the Scribner's Magazine for May, 1888, William Perry Northrup told the story of a cruise made by the New York pilot boat David Carll, No, 4 when she made an attempt, in the rough weather, to tow an abandoned three-masted bark Alice Roy Quebec into the New York port. Pilots Frank Nelson, William Maxwell, Dennis Reardon, Robert G. Sylvester, Allan M. Beebe, and Jeremiah Reardon were on duty. They took a yawl over to the bark to inspect her and add a hawser to try to tow her into port. When that failed, they placed a ship light high up on her stay rope as she was in the steamers' track.

On July 19, 1889, the Pilot Robert Sylvester and Captain Jeremiah Reardon, of the pilot boat David Carll reported that they saw a lost airship descend from the air with a boat attached, twenty-five miles from Fire Island. The aeronaut did not need assistance as she discarded some extra ballast and rose again.

On September 9, 1891, pilot Robert Sylvester of the pilot boat David Carll, No. 4 brought in the Red Star Line Westland that was hit by a cyclone three hundred miles east of Sandy Hook. The Westland was helping the pilot boat Washington, No. 22, that was in tow by the pilot boat, Edward F. Williams, No. 24. The Westland threw her a hawser, which was attached to the Washington's bow. The Westland tried to tow her to port, but the strain on the chain was too great so she dropped it. The Washington was able to arrive safely back into port with damages to her masts.

== End of service ==
On September 16, 1893, the David Carll, No. 4, of the New York and New Jersey fleet, had onboard pilots Allen Beebe, Robert Sylvester, and Edward Nichols, as well as the boatkeeper and cook. On her return home, after pilots boarded several steamers, the David Carll was at Fire Island when a storm developed. The high sea forced her ashore and she started to break apart. The crew was able to escape in life boats. The pilot boat was discovered by the Merritt Wrecking Company. She was valued at $12,000 and was only partially insured.

== See also ==
- List of Northeastern U. S. Pilot Boats
- City Island Nautical Museum
