= Anthony B. Neilson =

New York Pilot boat

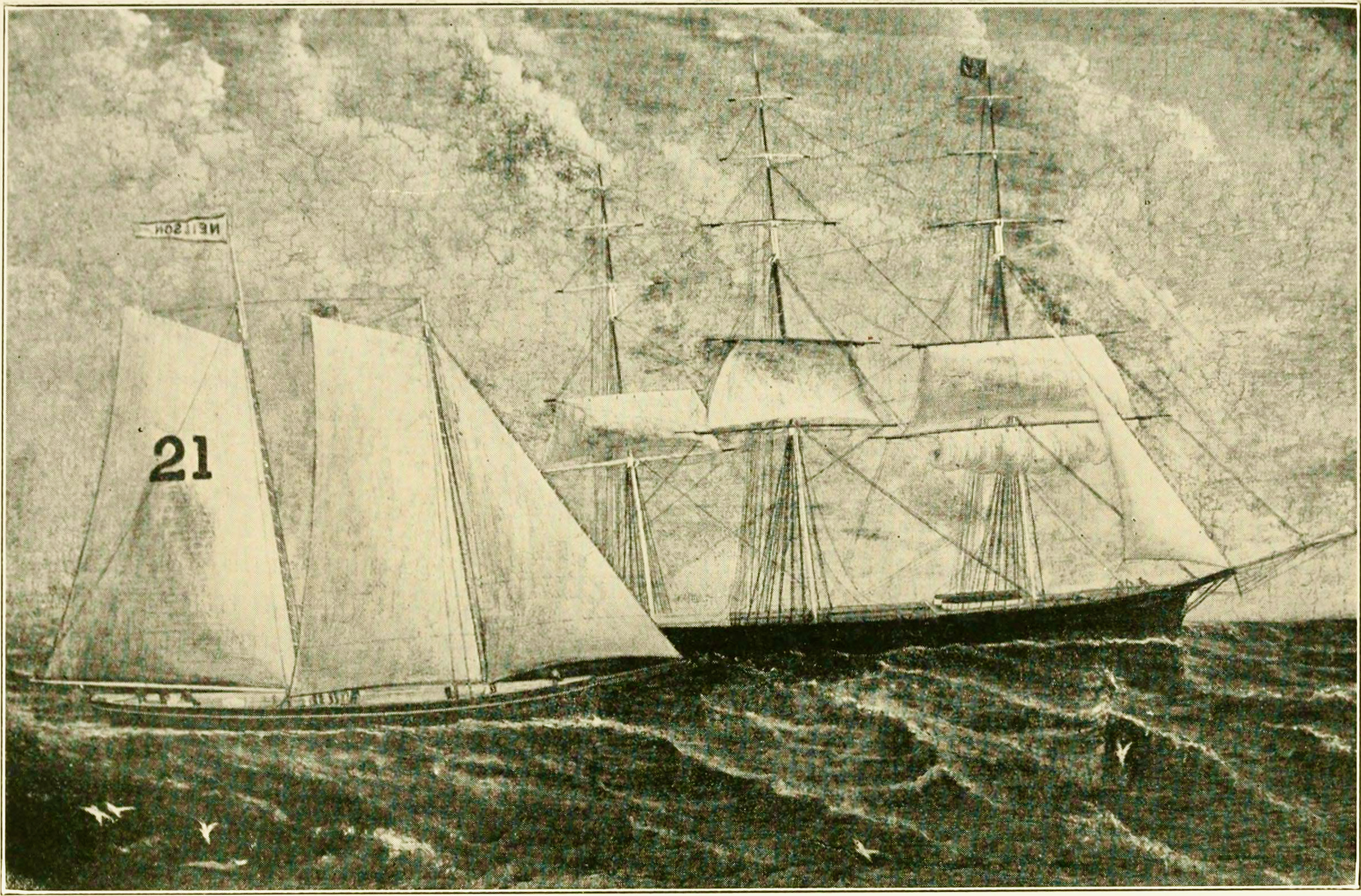
- Pilot boat Anthony B. Neilson, No. 21., taking pilots off an outbound Clipper ship.

History

United States
- Name: Anthony B. Neilson
- Namesake: Anthony Bleecker Neilson, president of Sun Mutual Insurance Company
- Owner: New York Pilots
- Operator: John F. Clark, Peter Bayley, Thomas Aitken, George W. Christopher, Talph Noble, Gideon L. Mapes, William Anderson
- Builder: George Steers
- Launched: 1854
- Out of service: August, 1859
- Fate: Sold

General characteristics
- Class & type: schooner
- Tonnage: 50-tons TM
- Draft: 9 ft 0 in (2.74 m)
- Propulsion: Sail

The Anthony B. Neilson was a 19th-century Sandy Hook pilot boat, built in 1854 by George Steers for a company of New York Sandy Hook pilots. She was considered to be the fastest boat in the piloting business. She helped transport New York City maritime pilots between inbound or outbound ships coming into the New York Harbor. She survived the Great Blizzard of 1888. In 1859, the Neilson was sold to a group of New Orleans pilots. The New York pilots then replaced the Neilson, with a new pilot boat, the John D. Jones.

== Construction and service ==
The Anthony B. Neilson, was a pilot-boat built in 1854 by George Steers for a company of five New York pilots. She was built by the Steers at the Hawthorne shipyard, in Williamsburg, Brooklyn. The boat was named after Anthony Bleecker Neilson, who was president of the Sun Mutual Insurance Company and on the board of underwriters. Captain John F. Clark was the commander of the boat. She was considered to be the fastest boat in the piloting business.

The Neilson was George Steers' last effort in the pilot boat line. She was an exact model of the pilot-boat George Steers, except that she was ten feet longer. A half hull model of the Anthony B. Neilson was made by George Steers. The model is varnished and inscribed, in black-outlined letters, with the name: "ANTHONY B. NEILSON." She was often referred to as the Anthony B. Neilson, or just A. B. Neilson. The boat number "21" was painted as a large number on her mainsail, that identified her as belonging to the New York and Sandy Hook Pilots' Association.

In the summer of 1854, the pilot boat Anthony B. Neilson, No. 21, averaged over twenty knots in four successive hours of sailing from Southampton, L.I. to Goat Island.

On September 20, 1854, the Anthony B. Neilson, encountered the schooner Marietta, from New Orleans, that was in a storm and leaking badly, her foresail was split and her bulwarks were gone.

On October 19, 1856, the Neilson ran into the pilot boat Julia, No. 15, of New York, off the Sandy Hook Light. The Julia broke into two and sank. Her pilots and crew were rescued. There was no light was on the Julia except a small handlamp in the ship's binnacle. The case went to the district court.

On January 21, 1857, the Neilson was out cruising with pilots John Clarke, Peter Bayley, Thomas Aitken, George W. Christopher, Ralph Noble, Gideon L. Mapes, and William Anderson. After boarding a schooner at Owl's Head, both vessels were carried ashore by the ice. They were rescued by the steamtug Hercules. The Neilson lost part of her keel and broke her rudder.

== End of service ==
In August, 1859, the Anthony B. Neilson was sold to a group of New Orleans pilots, to be used as a pilot boat at La Balize, Louisiana. She sailed for New Orleans on August 24, 1859, with Captain George Benson as the new owner. The New York pilots then replaced the Neilson, with the John D. Jones, by December 28, 1859.

== See also ==
- List of Northeastern U. S. Pilot Boats
