= Widgeon (pilot boat) =

New York Pilot boat

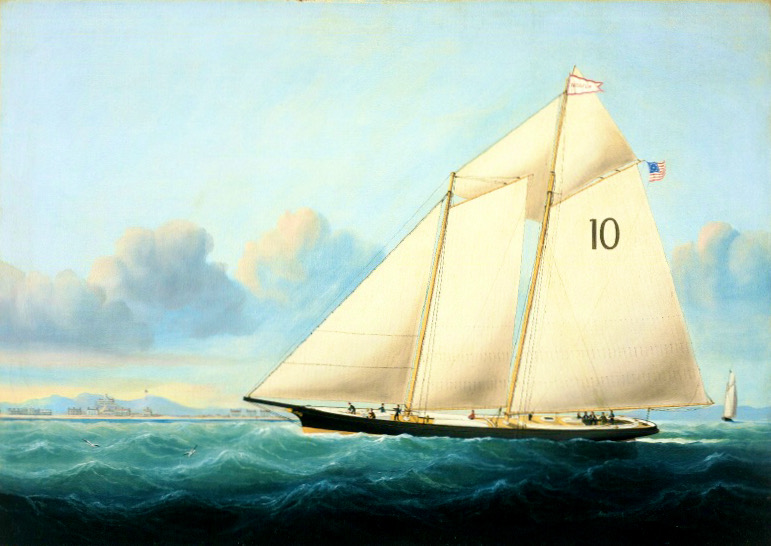
- New York pilot boat Widgeon, No. 10, off Sandy Hook; Painting by William Gay Yorke.

History

United States
- Name: Widgeon
- Owner: Daniel Edgar (1855–1865); William Edgar (1855–1865); C.C. Dodge (1867–1871); G.G. Haven (1867–1871); Franklin Osgood (1865–1867); Lloyd Phoenix (1867–1871); Jas. Robertson (1883–1884); New York Pilots (1876–1882); Gideon L. Mapes; Ralph Noble; George S. Cisco; W. H. Anderson; Peter H. Bailey
- Operator: Peter R. Baillie (1876–1882); Jas. Robertson (1883–1884)
- Builder: James R. & George Steers
- Launched: January 1, 1856
- Out of service: 1879, condemned as unseaworthy
- Honors and awards: America's Cup defense in 1870

General characteristics
- Class & type: schooner
- Tonnage: 50-tons TM
- Length: 80 ft 0 in (24.38 m)
- Beam: 19 ft 0 in (5.79 m)
- Depth: 7 ft 0 in (2.13 m)
- Propulsion: Sail

The Widgeon was a 19th-century yacht and Sandy Hook pilot boat, built in 1855 by James R. & George Steers for Daniel Edgar of the New York Yacht Club and designed by George Steers. She came in 17th in an unsuccessful America's Cup defense in 1870. Widgeon was sold in 1871 to a group of New York pilots to replace the John D. Jones, which sank in a collision with the steamer City of Washington. New York pilots condemned the Widgeon as unseaworthy in 1879, which sparked a fight for steam pilot-boat service. In 1883 a decision was affirmed by the Supreme Court and the Board of Commissioners of Pilots that pilot boats could be "propelled" by steam.

== Construction and service ==
=== Yacht Widgeon ===
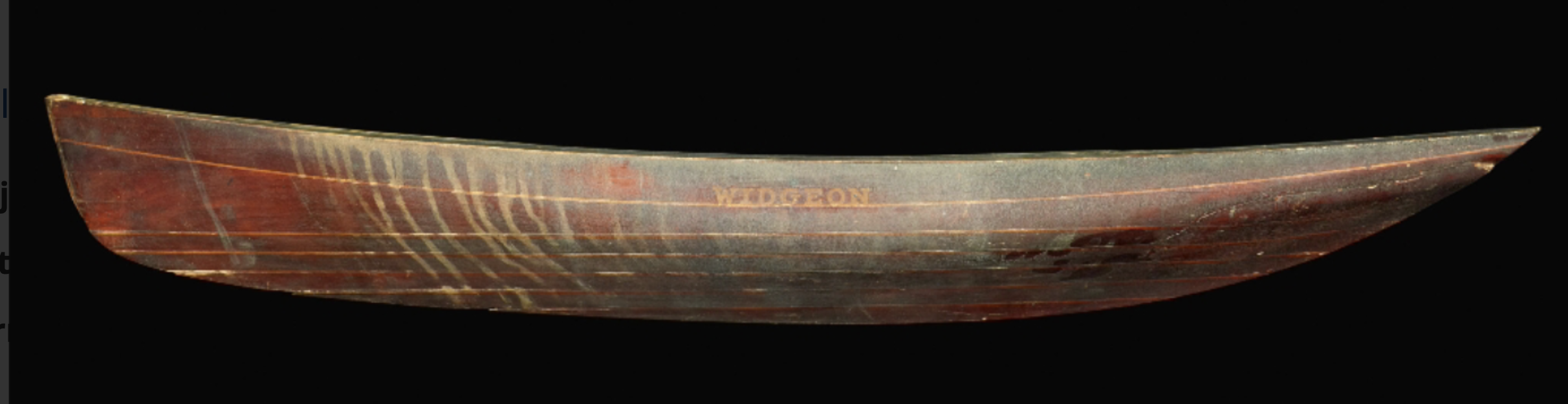
Widgeon Half Model of the centerboard sloop.

The New York two-masted schooner Widgeon, was built in 1855, as a yacht for owner Daniel Edgar, a member of the New York Yacht Club. His brother, William Edgar, was then Commodore. Widgeon was designed by ship designer George Steers. Edgar wanted Steers to build the Widgeon to beat the fast sloop Julia.

On January 1, 1856, the Widgeon was launched from the James R. & George Steers shipyard. She was listed as the yacht Widgeon, 110 tons, for Daniel Edgar.

On August 8, 1856, the sloop Widgeon was in the 1st Class of entries with Daniel M. Edgar in the New York Yacht Club Regatta at New Bedford, Massachusetts. In this race, she competed with the sloop Julia and other boats in her class.

On April 4, 1863, the New York Daily Herald carried an advertisement for the sale of the Widgeon. The ad read: "For Sale-The Schooner Widgeon: Built by the late George Steers; is 82 feet in length, 20 feet beam and 9 feet draught of water, and 101 tons Custom House measurement."

In 1865, the owner of the Widgeon was Franklin Osgood of the New York Yacht Club. On April 28, 1867, Lloyd Phoenix, Rear Commodore of the New York Yacht Club, purchased the yacht Widgeon from Franklin Osgood.

In June 1867, Phoenix entered the Widgeon in the annual June New York Yacht Club regatta. She raced against the Dauntless, Magic, Phantom, Vesta, and other schooners and sloops. The course was from Owl's Head to the Sandy Hook Light and back.

=== 1870 America's cup ===
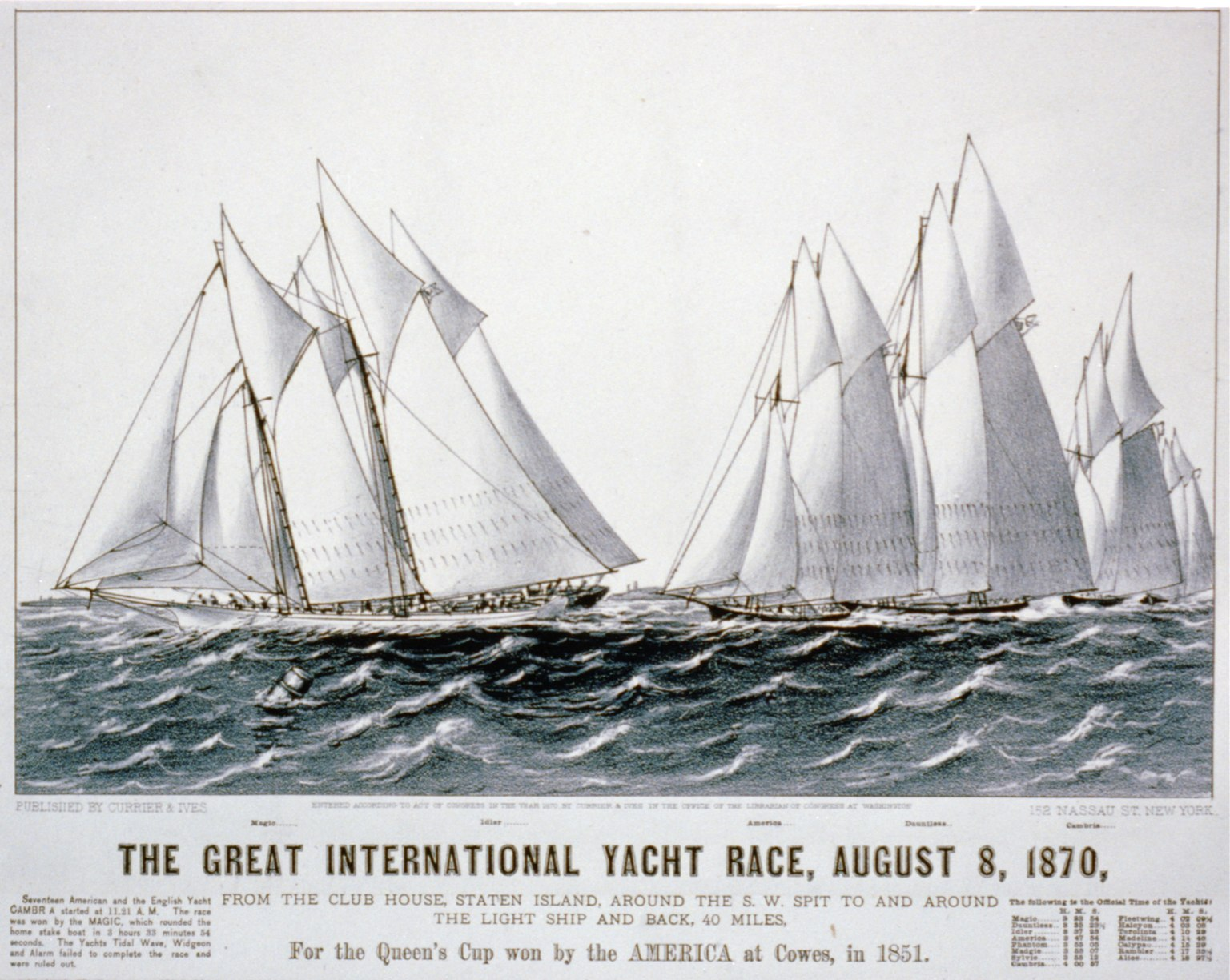
The 1870 America's Cup yacht race, August 8, 1870.

On August 8, 1870, the international 1870 America's Cup (also called the Queen's Cup) was the first America's Cup to be hosted in the United States at New York Harbor. The course started from the Staten Island N.Y.Y.C anchorage down through the Narrows to the S.W. Split buoy, across to the Sandy Hook lightship and return to Staten Island. The race was won by the Franklin Osgood's Magic with the Widgeon finishing in 17th place.

=== Pilot Boat Widgeon ===
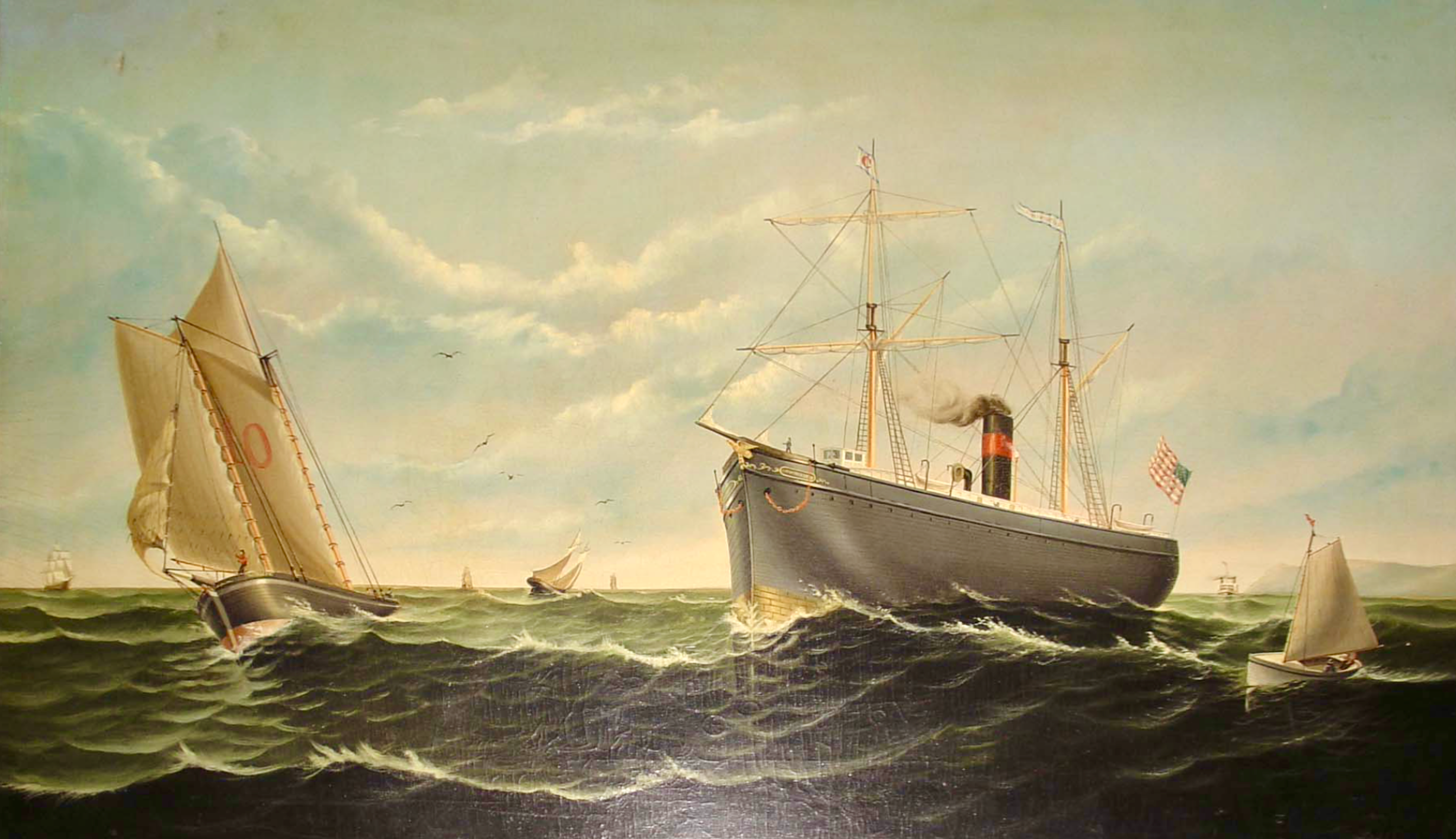
Pilot boat Widgeon, No. 10., and SS City Of Vera Cruz; painting by Willis H. Plummer.

On April 30, 1871, the yacht Widgeon was sold to a group of New York pilots that owned the pilot-boat John D. Jones, which sank in a collision with the steamer City of Washington. The boat number "10" was painted as a large number on her mainsail, that identified the boat as belonging to the New York and New Jersey Sandy Hook Pilots Association.

On October 9, 1873, the pilot-boat Widgeon, No. 10, was one of the boats that participated in the Ocean Regatta, which was a race from Owl's Head Point around to Cape May Lighthouse in New Jersey, and back to the Sandy hook Lightship. Captain Peter R. Baillie sailed the Widgeon in the race. Of the pilot-boats, the Thomas S. Negus took first place and the Widgeon second, the Mary E. Fish third, the James W. Elwell fourth, and the Edmund Blunt last.

The Widgeon was registered with the Record of American and Foreign Shipping, from 1876 to 1884. From 1876 to 1882 her Master was Captain Peter R. Baillie and the New York Pilots were the owners. From 1883 to 1884, Jas. Robertson was the owner and ship master. She was listed as weighing 106 tons (old), 50 tons (new), being 80 feet long under water, 19 feet wide, and 7 feet deep.

On January 9, 1875. the SS City Of Vera Cruz left New York on her maiden voyage with pilot boat Widgeon, No. 10.

== End of service ==
In November 1879, pilot Ralph Nobles introduced a new steam pilot-boat into the service. He and Gideon L. Mapes, George S. Cisco, W. H. Anderson, and Peter H. Bailey, from the pilot-boat Widgeon, bought the steam tugboat Hercules and converted her into a pilot-boat. They placed the number "10" on her smokestack. They condemned the Widgeon as unseaworthy. In June 1881, several pilots wanted the pilot-boat Widgeon recommissioned. Other pilots that wanted a steam pilot service tried to prevent this because they preferred the steamboat over the sailboat. In June 1883, the decision was affirmed by the Supreme Court and the Board of Commissioners of Pilots, that pilot-boats could be "propelled" in whole or in part by steam.

== See also ==
- List of Northeastern U. S. Pilot Boats
