= Mary E. Fish =

Boston Pilot boat

- Schooner sail plan

History

United States
- Name: Mary E. Fish
- Namesake: Mary E. Fish, wife of a South Street merchant
- Owner: New York Pilots (1861-1880); New Jersey Pilots (1881-1885)
- Operator: Richard Brown
- Builder: Edward F. Williams shipyard
- Cost: $15,000
- Launched: April 24, 1861
- Out of service: November 8, 1885
- Fate: Sank

General characteristics
- Class & type: schooner
- Tonnage: 46-tons TM
- Length: 80 ft 0 in (24.38 m)
- Beam: 20 ft 0 in (6.10 m)
- Depth: 8 ft 0 in (2.44 m)
- Propulsion: Sail
- Sail plan: 69 ft 0 in (21.03 m) (foremast); 70 ft 6 in (21.49 m) (mainmast)

The Mary E. Fish was a 19th-century Sandy Hook pilot boat, built at the Edward F. Williams shipyard of Greenpoint, Brooklyn in 1861 for Richard Brown and the New York Pilots. She was built to replace the Mary Taylor. The Fish was hit and sank by the schooner Frank Harrington in 1885 and replaced by the David Carll.

== Construction and service ==
The pilot boat Mary E. Fish was built in 1861 from the Edward F. Williams shipyard of Greenpoint, Brooklyn. The Mary E. Fish, was built to replace the Mary Taylor, that was hit and sank by the U. S. steam transport Fairhaven in 1863.

On April 24, 1861, the Mary E. Fish was launched from the Edward F. Williams shipyard for the New Jersey and Sandy Hook pilots. Williams had recently launched the pilot boats Fannie (1860) and Mary A. Williams (1861). The boat's name was in honor of the wife of a South Street merchant Mrs. Mary E. Fish. The sail number "4" was painted as a large number on the mainsail identified the boat as belonging to the Sandy Hook Pilots.

Richard Brown was the captain and part owner of the pilot boat Mary E. Fish. He helped supervise the construction of the Fish, and served aboard as master her from 1876 to 1885. She was registered as a pilot Schooner with the Record of American and Foreign Shipping, from 1876 to 1885. Her ship master was Richard Brown; her owners were New York Pilots; built in 1861 at New York; and her hailing port was the Port of New York. Her dimensions were 80 ft. length on deck; 20 ft. breadth of beam; and 8 ft. depth of hold; and 46-tons Tonnage.

On December 23, 1869, the Mary E. Fish, No. 4 was on a cruise with Captain Richard Brown in command. He was 70 miles south of Sandy Hook when he encountered the wreck of the schooner Saxon, with a cargo of yellow pine lumber, that had been run into by the steamship Leo. Captain Brown toed the Saxon to the Erie Basin.

On May 9, 1872, William A. Lucky, a Sandy Hook pilot for 25 years, was on the pilot boat Mary E. Fish, No. 8, of the New Jersey and Sandy Hook Pilot Company. After boarding the outgoing brig Susan, he returned to the station boat Washington. When attempting to board the pilot boat Charlotte Webb, he drowned when the yawl he was in capsized.

On October 9, 1873, the Mary E. Fish was one of the boats that participated in the Ocean Regatta, which was a race from Owl's Head Point around to Cape May Lighthouse in New Jersey, and back to the Sandy hook Lightship. Captain Richard Brown sailed the Fish in the race and represented the New York Pilots. Of the pilot-boats, the Thomas S. Negus took first place and the Widgeon was second, the Mary E. Fish third, the James W. Elwell fourth, and the Edmund Blunt was last.

In 1874, the Mary E. Fish, No. 4, was listed with the New Jersey Pilots and Richard Brown as her captain.

On June 4, 1878, pilot boat Mary E. Fish, No. 4, with Captain Richard Brown, rescued the captain, his wife and four children and the crew from the sinking two-masted schooner George Kilburn of Bangor, Maine. The schooner was on Long Beach, eight miles above Little Egg Harbor Inlet. The schooner was carrying 153 pieces of granite when the vessel was caught up in a storm causing her to sink.

== End of service ==
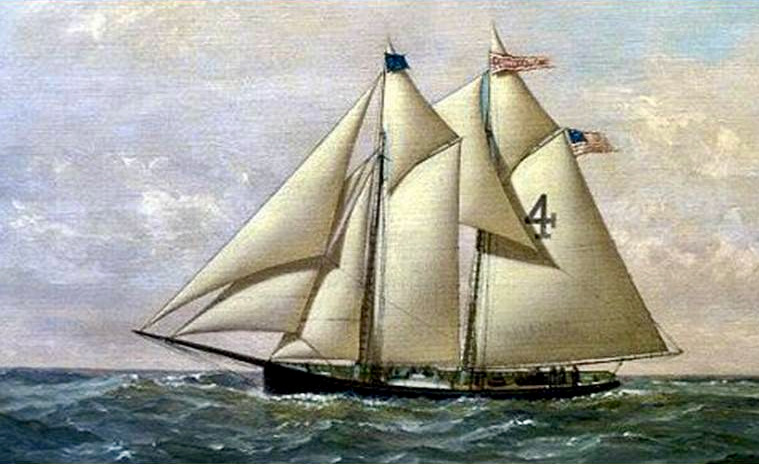
Pilot Boat David Carll.

On May 8, 1885, the New Jersey pilot boat Mary A. Fish, No. 4, was run down and sank by the schooner Frank Harrington 40 miles southwest of Barnegat Light. The four pilots and crew were able to escape from the sinking vessel. The Brooklyn pilots were Frank Nelson, Robert Sylvester, William Maxwell, and Jeremiah Reardon. The crew were transferred from the schooner to the pilot boat Mary and Catherine and then to the steamship Saxon, which brought them back to the city. She was worth $15,000 and had some insurance. On September 9, 1885, the pilot owners filed a suit for damages with the US District court against the schooner Frank Harrington. The claim was for $14,000 in damages for the boat and $2,000 for the loss of property on the boat.

The pilot owners entered into a contract to build a new boat with shipbuilder David Carll at City Island, which they named after him, the pilot boat David Carll.

== See also ==
- List of Northeastern U. S. Pilot Boats
