= Phantom (yacht) =

Schooner Yacht

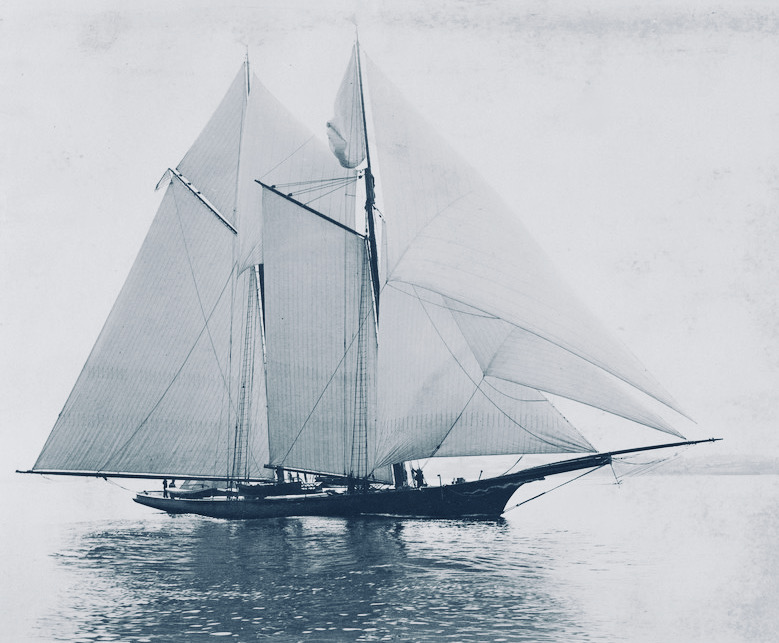
- Schooner Yacht Phantom by Nathaniel Stebbins.

History

United States
- Name: Phantom
- Owner: Henry G. Stebbins (1865-1873); William Henry Osgood (1873-1879); Henry S. Hovey (1879-1883); Eugene V. R. Thayer (1883-1886); E. Griscom Haven (1886-1889); H. S. Parmelee (1889-1900)
- Builder: Joseph D. Van Deusen
- Launched: 1865
- Out of service: 1900
- Home port: New York City
- Honors and awards: America's Cup defense in 1870

General characteristics
- Class & type: Schooner
- Type: centerboard schooner-yacht
- Tonnage: 123.3 tonnage burden
- Length: 92 ft 0 in (28.04 m) on deck
- Propulsion: schooner sail
- Sail plan: 2,063.4 sq ft (191.70 m^{2}) sail area

The Phantom was a 19th-century centerboard schooner-yacht built in 1865 by Joseph D. Van Deusen and first owned by yachtsman Henry G. Stebbins. She was one of the fastest yachts in the New York squadron. The Phantom won 1st place in the June 1867 New York Yacht Club regatta. She came in 7th place in an unsuccessful America's Cup defense in 1870. She was sold as a racing yacht several times before she went out of service in 1900.

== Construction and service ==
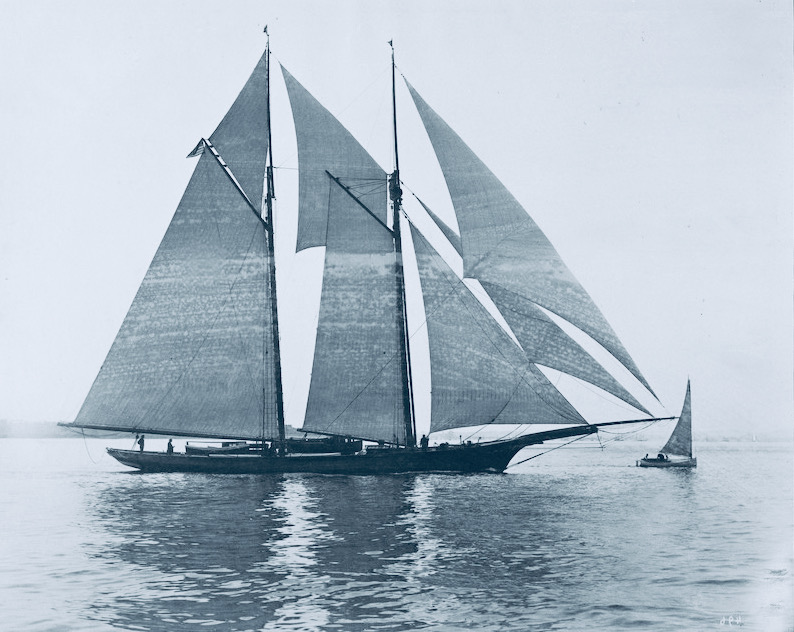
Phantom centerboard schooner.

The Phantom was a centerboard schooner built in the summer of 1865 by Joseph D. Van Deusen and owned by yachtsman Henry G. Stebbins and part of the New York Yacht Squadron. She was constructed on the same model as the flagship yacht Sylvia. She was 123.3 tons burden, and 92 length on deck. She was painted a deep maroon.

=== June Regatta ===
In June 1867, the schooner Phantom was in the annual June New York Yacht Club regatta. Commodore H. G. Stebbins was listed as owner. She raced against the Magic, Dauntless, Widgeon, Vesta, and other schooners and sloops. The course was from Owl's Head to the S.W. Split, then across to the Sandy Hook Lightship and back. Phantom came in 1st place at 5hr. 40min, and 57 secs; the Magic 2nd place at 5hr. 48min, and 24 secs and the Dauntless 4th place at 6hr. 7min, and 12 secs.

=== 1870 America's cup ===
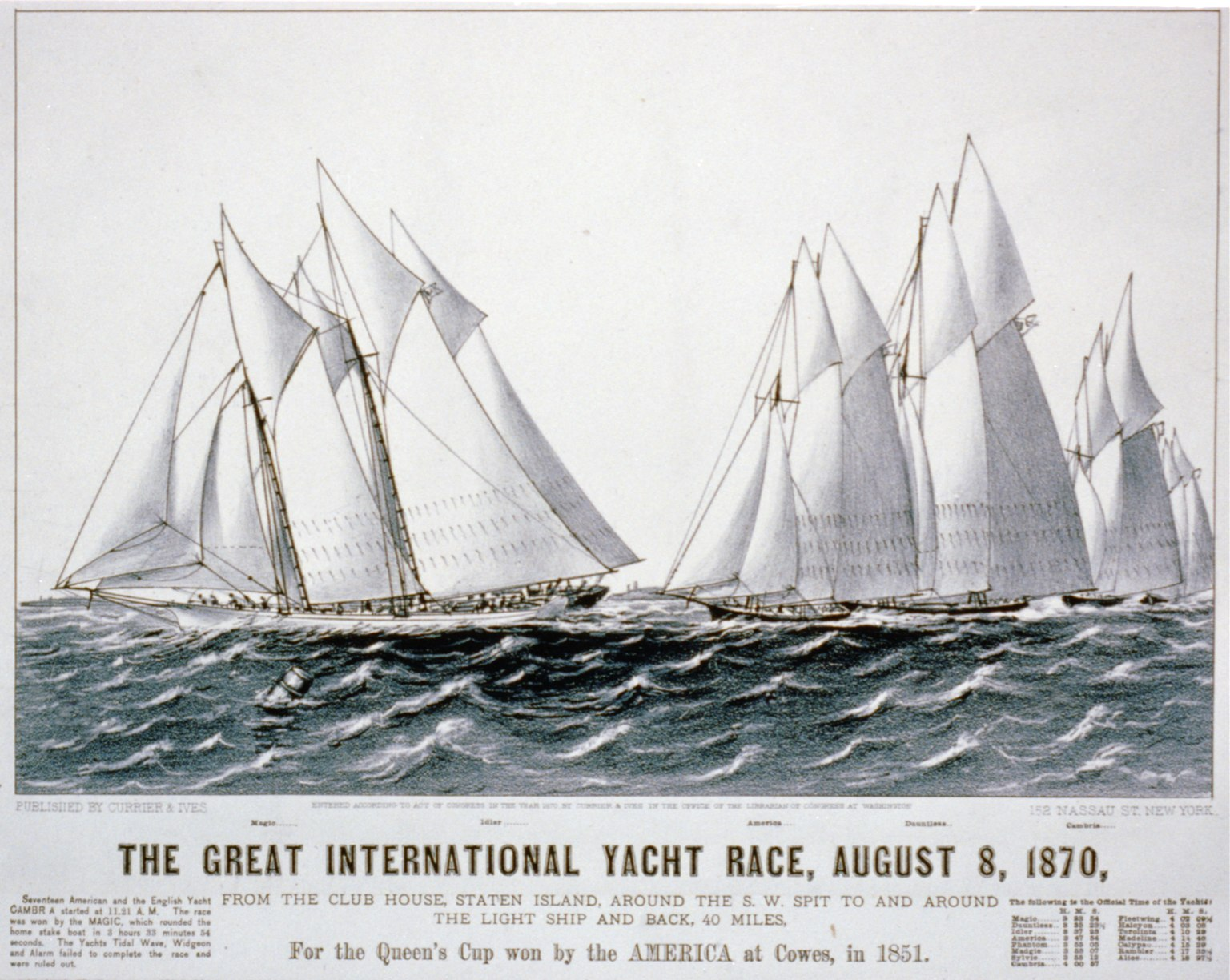
The 1870 America's Cup yacht race, August 8, 1870.

On August 8, 1870, the international 1870 America's Cup (also called the Queen's Cup) was the first America's Cup to be hosted in the United States at New York Harbor. Henry G. Stebbins with his American schooner Phantom was in the competition. The course started from the Staten Island N.Y.Y.C anchorage down through the Narrows to the S.W. Split buoy, across to the Sandy Hook lightship and return to Staten Island. The race was won by the Franklin Osgood's Magic with the Phantom finishing in 7th place. Franklin Osgood's yacht Magic beat 16 competitors from the New York Yacht Club, including James Lloyd Ashbury's English yacht Cambria that sailed to New York on behalf of the Royal Thames Yacht Club and the yachts Dauntless, Idler, Fleetwing, Phantom, America and others.

In September, 1870, there was a single match race for the Newport Cup against Asbury's yacht Cambria, Stebbins yacht Phantom and the yacht Madeline, owned by Jacob Voorhis Jr. The course was off the New York Harbor. The Cambria was badly beaten by the Phantom and Madeline.

In June 1873, yachtsman William Henry Osgood purchased the yacht Phantom from ex-Commodore Henry G. Stebbins. She was fitted out in New London for the July season.

In August 1874, the Phantom was in the Newburgh, New York yacht regatta. She won a silver service as the first prize for first-class yachts. She competed against the Loreled, Startle, Emily, and Le Roy yachts.

On May 12, 1879, Osgood sold the Phantom to Henry S. Hovey of Boston. He moved her to the Eastern Yacht Club located in Marblehead, Massachusetts. Hovey sailed her for the next five years, where he took her on a number of trips to New York for races there and at New Bedford. In 1881, the Phantom was one of the yachts which took part in the Yorktown celebration. In 1882, Hovey had the keel schooner-rigged yacht Fortuna built by C. & R. Poillon of Brooklyn, New York from a design by A. Cary Smith.

Hovey sold the Phantom in August 1883 to Eugene V. R. Thayer of Boston. Thayer took the Phantom on races in New Bedford at the Eastern Yacht Club.

Hovey then sold her in March 1886 to E. Griscom Haven, owner of the schooner Lotus and member of the N.Y.Y.C. He sailed the yacht from Boston to New York.

In July 1889, the Phantom was purchased by Commodore Henry S. Parmelee of the New Haven Yacht Club in Connecticut where she served as a flagship. She sailed from New York to New Haven. On July 30, 1893, Parmelee was in command of eighteen boats entered in the squadron for the twelfth annual cruise of the New Haven Yacht club, held at the Thimble Islands off Long Island Sound, near Branford, Connecticut. The course was from the Thimble Islands to Stonington, Connecticut, Newport, Rhode Island, and Martha's Vineyard. In May 1894, Parmelee had the Phantom condemned and summoned out of service because her timbers had become decayed. In May 1896, Parmelee had the Phantom rebuilt at a cost of $12,000 and went into commission May 15. Captain James Carberry was the sailing master of the yacht.

== End of service ==
On Oct 24, 1900, the sailing days of the Phantom were over when she was purchased by James E. Stannard of New Haven and turned into a houseboat.
