= John D. Jones (pilot boat) =

New York Pilot boat

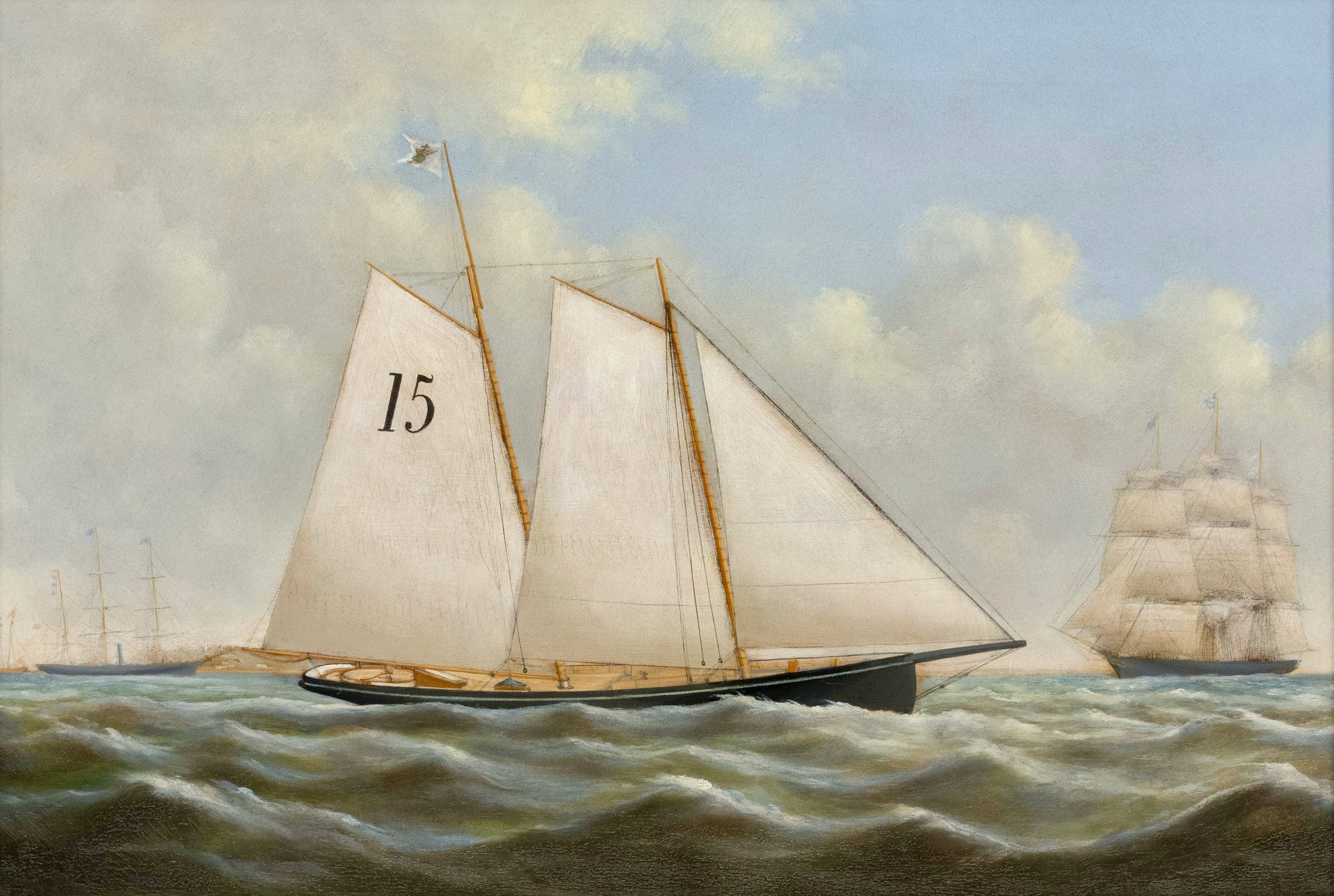
- Pilot Boat John D. Jones, No. 15., painted by J. Hansen.

History

United States
- Name: John D. Jones
- Namesake: John Divine Jones, the President of the Atlantic Mutual Insurance Company
- Owner: New York Pilots
- Operator: Peter R. Baillie
- Builder: J.B & J.D. Van Deusen shipyard
- Launched: 28 Dec 1859
- Christened: 28 Dec 1859
- Out of service: 18 March 1871
- Fate: Sank

General characteristics
- Class & type: schooner
- Tonnage: 50-tons TM
- Draft: 9 ft 0 in (2.74 m)
- Propulsion: Sail

The John D. Jones was a 19th-century Sandy Hook pilot boat, built in 1859 at the Van Deusen shipyard in East River for a company of New York Sandy Hook pilots. She was one of the finest vessels of her class. She was replaced by the pilot-boat Widgeon, when the Jones sank in a collision with the steamer City of Washington in 1871.

== Construction and service ==
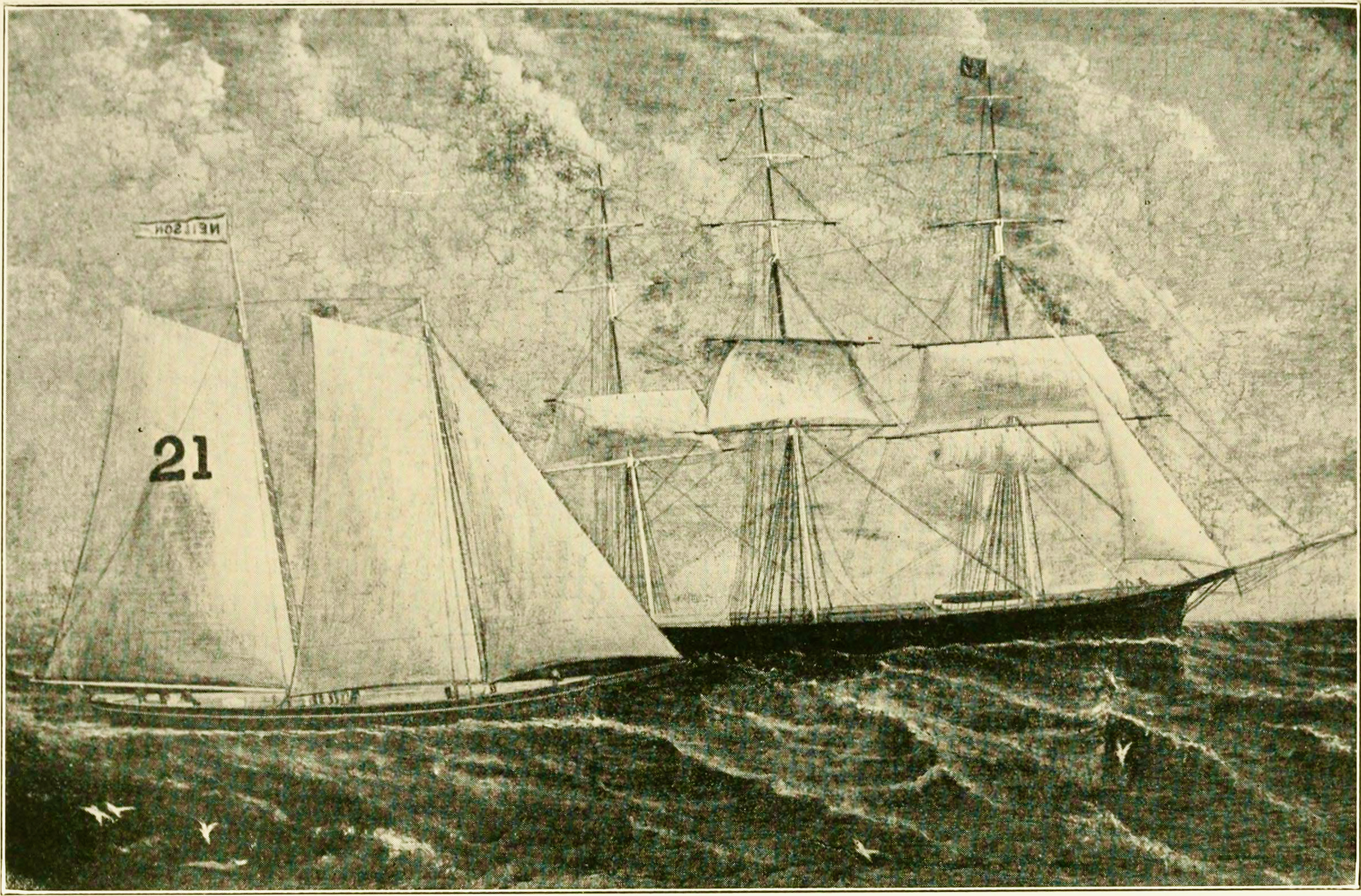
Pilot boat Anthony B. Neilson, No. 21.

New York pilot-boat John D. Jones, No. 15, was launched on 28 December 1859 from the J.B & J.D. Van Deusen shipyard at the foot of Sixteenth Street, East River. The boat was built for a company of Sandy Hook pilots, which owned the Anthony B. Neilson, No. 21, which was sold in the spring of 1859 to a group of New Orleans pilots. The Jones was christened in honor of the John Divine Jones, the President of the Atlantic Mutual Insurance Company.

In 1860, she was one of only twenty-one pilot boats that were in the New York and New Jersey fleet. On 10 October 1860, New York Sandy Hook Pilot Frederick Baudier, of the pilot boat J. D. Jones, No. 15, signed a statement along with other pilots, that they were satisfied with the representation they have received from the New York Board of Commissioners of Pilots.

The John D. Jones was registered with the Record of American and Foreign Shipping, in 1871. Her owners were the New York Pilots and Peter R. Baillie was the ship Master. Her dimensions were 9 ft. draught; and 50-tons burthen.

On March 29, 1869, the pilot boat John D. Jones, No. 15, was reported missing from a twenty-one day cruise. When last heard east of Montauk, she had three pilots on board, Thomas Aitken, Peter Bailey, and Thomas Murphy.

== End of service ==
On 18 March 1871, on a stormy dark night, the pilot boat John D. Jones, was struck when attempting to board the Inman Line steamship City of Washington, traveling from Liverpool for New York, 270 miles east from Sandy Hook. She filled with water and sank in 15 minutes. The pilots and crew were all saved and taken on board the Washington. At the time of the disaster she was valued at $6,000. She was one of the finest boat of her class.

The John D. Jones, was then replaced by the yacht schooner Widgeon, on April 30, 1871. The Widgeon had been a yacht and the New York pilots converted her into a pilot-boat.

== See also ==
- List of Northeastern U. S. Pilot Boats
