= Thomas H. Smith (pilot boat) =

New York Pilot boat

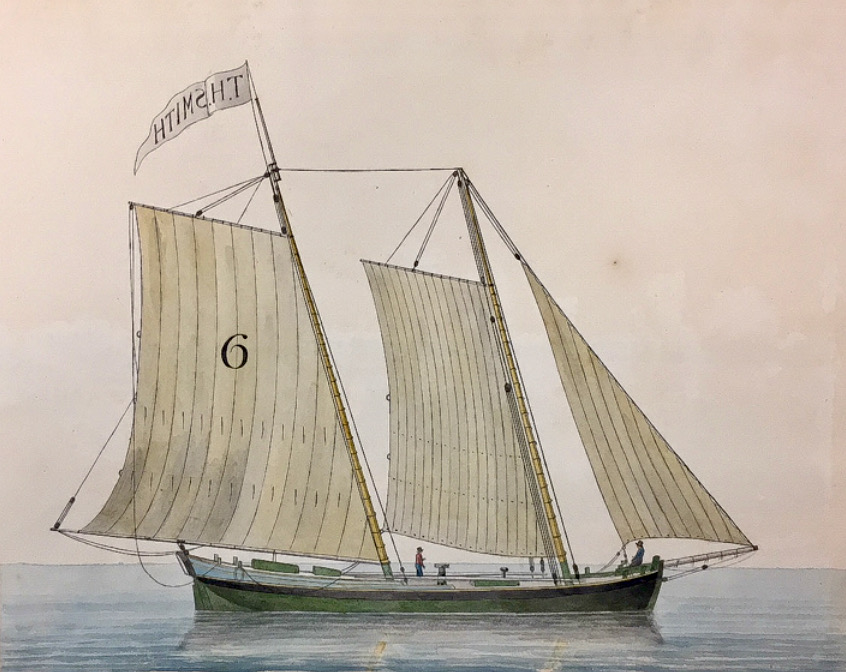
- 19th Century Watercolor painting of the American Pilot Boat Thomas H. Smith, No. 6., ca. 1814.

History

United States
- Name: Thomas H. Smith
- Namesake: Thomas H. Smith
- Owner: New York Pilots
- Operator: Owen Callanan, Theophilus Beebe
- In service: about 1820
- Out of service: August 31, 1857
- Homeport: New York
- Fate: Wrecked

General characteristics
- Class & type: Schooner
- Propulsion: sails
- Sail plan: Schooner-rigged

The Thomas H. Smith, or T. H. Smith, was a 19th-century Sandy Hook pilot boat built for the New York pilots around 1820. She helped transport maritime pilots between inbound or outbound ships coming into the New York Harbor. In 1840, she was one of only eight pilot boats in the New York fleet. In 1857, she went ashore and sank six miles from Barnegat.

== Construction and service ==
The Pilot boat Thomas H. Smith was reported as early as November 23, 1820, when she reported that the ship America, from Calcutta, was stranded a few miles from Sandy Hook, and had washed up.

On January 28, 1822, the pilot boat Thomas H. Smith was on a cruise off Sandy Hook, where she helped vessels in need of assistance. She supplied vessels with fresh provisions, and brought the passengers into town, from the ship Cotton Plant from Savannah, that was anchored near Prince's Bay.

On March 26, 1827, the pilot boat Thomas H. Smith brought to the city a skiff with two exhausted African American men, ten miles outside Sandy Hook. They had run away from Middletown, N. J., with the intention of coming to New York.

In 1840, there were only eight pilot boats in the New York fleet. They were the Phantom, No. 1; Washington, No. 2; New York, No. 3; Jacob Bell, No. 4; Blossom, No. 5; T. H. Smith, No. 6; John E. Davidson, No. 7; and the Virginia, No. 8.

On December 14, 1840, Owen Callanan, of the pilot boat T. H. Smith, along with other pilots from the port of New York, stated that they had never been employed by J. D. Stevenson and no compensation has been offered or demanded.

On February 8, 1846, the pilot boat Thomas H. Smith rescued a small boat containing three exhausted men by bringing them on board the Smith. They had left Gibbet Island on a fishing party and were caught in a storm.

Richard Brown served as pilot on the Thomas H Smith, along with Theophilus Beebe, John Ward, Benjamin Chase, Henry Beebe, and Daniel C. Chapman.

== End of service ==
On August 31, 1857, the pilot boat Thomas H. Smith driven ashore in a gale six miles from Barnegat Inlet, and was broken in pieces. The crew was rescued and brought back to the city.

== See also ==
- Pilot boats
- List of Northeastern U. S. Pilot Boats
