= George Steers (pilot boat) =

Sandy Hook Pilot boat

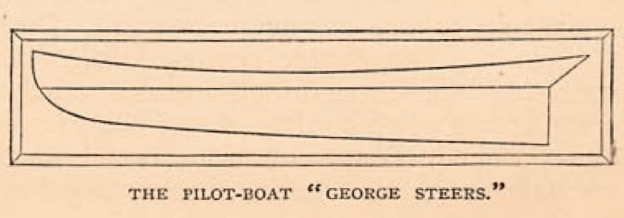
- Pilot Boat George Steers, c. 1882.

History

United States
- Name: George Steers
- Namesake: George Steers designer of yachts
- Owner: New Jersey Pilots
- Builder: George Steers
- Cost: $15,000
- Launched: August 9, 1852
- Out of service: February 12, 1865

General characteristics
- Class & type: Schooner
- Tonnage: 60 tons TM
- Length: 77 ft 0 in (23.47 m)
- Beam: 18 ft 0 in (5.49 m)
- Draft: 9 ft 6 in (2.90 m)
- Depth: 6 ft 0 in (1.83 m)
- Propulsion: Sail

The George Steers was a 19th-century pilot boat built in 1852 for the New Jersey Pilots' Association. She was designed by the yacht designer George Steers and considered to be one of the fastest boat sailing. She had a popular shorter bow overhang, similar to the celebrated yacht America She was driven ashore on the South Shoals near Barnegat Island in 1865. The pilot-boat A. T. Stewart, was built to replace the George Steers.

== Construction and service ==
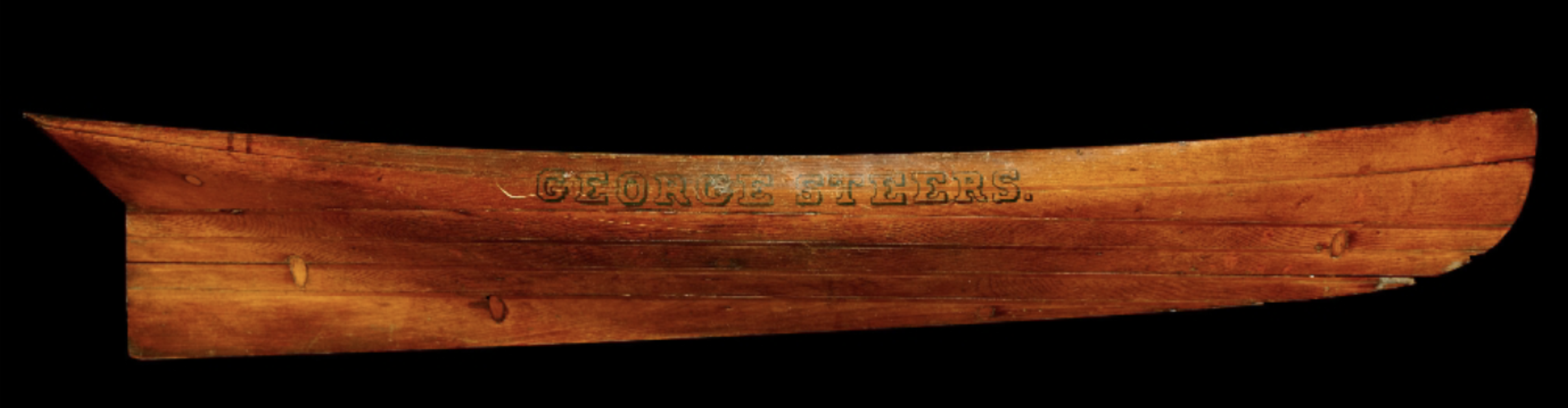
Pilot Boat George Steers Half hull model, made by George Steers.

Pilot-boat George Steers No. 6, was built by George Steers in 1852, at the William H. Brown shipyard in East River, New York City, for a company of New Jersey pilots. She was named in honor of George Steers. She was similar to the yacht America, that was built in 1851.

George Steers was launched by moonlight at 12 o'clock on August 9, 1852, at the William H. Brown shipyard at the foot of twelfth street, East River. She left the port under the command of George Steers along with other friends and acquaintances. They went down to White Stone to test out the sails and navigation of the new boat.

Steers made a half hull model of the pilot-boat George Steers, that shows the boat lines and construction details with a deep draft and keel that slopes up to the forefoot. She had a popular shorter bow overhang. This new design had the same lines as the popular yacht America, that was designed by James Rich Steers and George Steers.

Howard I. Chapelle, an American naval architect, considered George Steers, as a "fine example of that designer's final ideas of what a pilot schooner should be." Chapelle thought she was an improvement over the America and that the balance of her ends was exceptional. She is considered to be the finest of pilot-boats ever built, and the fastest boat sailing from the port of New York.

== End of service ==
On February 12, 1865, the George Steers, No. 6, was driven ashore on the South Shoals near Barnegat Island in a northeasterly gale and snowstorm. All five hands perished.

On October 11, 1865, the pilot-boat A. T. Stewart, No. 6, was launched from the shipyard of Edward F. Williams, at Greenpoint, at a cost of $21,000, to replace the George Steers, No. 6, which was lost in February 1865. Her name is from Alexander Turney Stewart the Dry Goods millionaire.

== See also ==
- List of Northeastern U. S. Pilot Boats
