= Richard Brown (pilot) =

American pilot

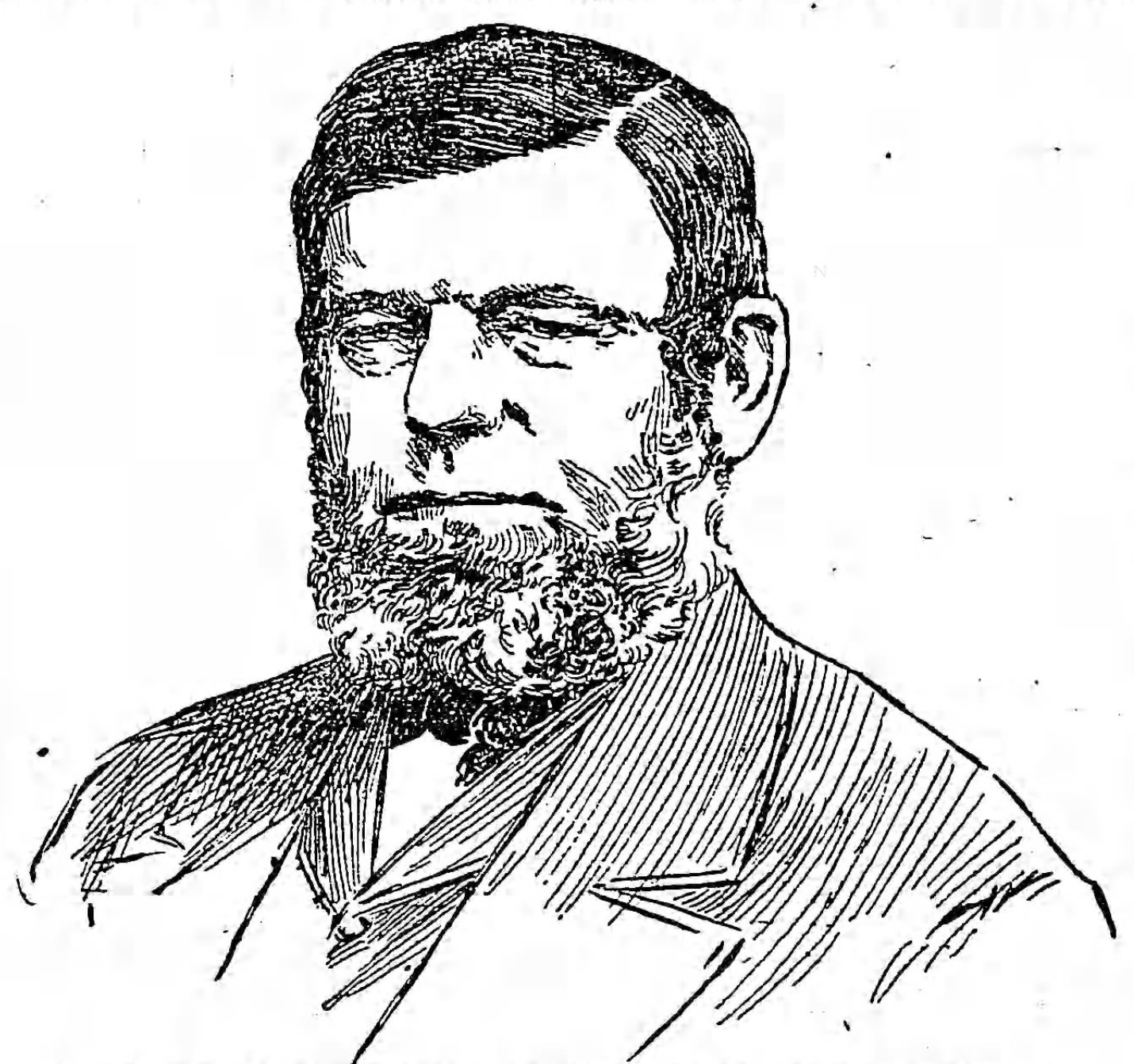
- Richard "Dick" Brown
- Born: 1810; Mystic, Connecticut, US
- Died: June 18, 1885 (aged 74–75); Brooklyn, New York, US
- Occupation: harbor pilot
- Children: 6

Richard Brown (1810 – June 18, 1885) was a 19th-century Sandy Hook pilot. Brown was captain for the 19th-century Sandy Hook pilot boat Mary Taylor. At the time of his death he was the oldest of the Sandy Hook pilots having served for 50 years. He was the captain of the racing yacht America, which won the inaugural America's Cup in 1851.

== Early life ==
Brown was born in Mystic, Connecticut in 1810. His father was a ship carpenter. He left home at an early age and went to sea.

== Professional life ==
Brown was commander of the steamer Falcon, which sailed between Savanah, Charleston, New York, and Boston. He entered service with the United States Coast Survey. He became a pilot on the US brig Washington, which had the task of surveying the port of New York. He then worked on the US brig Somers. In 1838, he left this service and became a New Jersey and Sandy Hook pilot. He received his pilot's license in January 1841. The Thomas H Smith was the first pilot boat Brown served as pilot along with Theophilus Beebe, John Ward, Benjamin Chase, Henry Beebe, and Daniel C. Chapman. He was on the pilot boat William G. Hagstaff, built by George Steers and Harthorne.

Brown was the owner and captain of the pilot boat Mary Taylor No. 17, built in 1849 at Williamsburg, New York, and designed by George Steers of whom he was a personal friend. Brown named her after the scandalous actress Mary Taylor. Steers designed her with a new thin bow and wide stern, which made her faster than any boat of her size.

In the 1850s Brown had risen from obscurity to be the subject of respect of the pilots, merchants, and shipowners of the city. He was chosen to be the captain on the America on her trip to England on June 20, 1851. His crew had a First mate, a Second mate, a Cook, and eight Seamen. Designer, George Steers was also a passenger and 2nd Mate. Brown was captain of the yacht when she won the Queen's cup in the race round the Isle of Wight in England on August 22, 1851.

Brown was also the captain and part owner of the pilot boat Mary E. Fish, No. 4. He helped supervise the construction of the Fish and served aboard her from 1876 to 1885. She was registered as a pilot Schooner with the Record of American and Foreign Shipping, from 1876 to 1885. Her ship master was Richard Brown; her owners were New York Pilots; built in 1861 at New York; and her hailing port was the Port of New York. On December 23, 1869, the Mary E. Fish, No. 4 was on a cruise with Captain Brown in command. He was 70 miles south of Sandy Hook when he encountered the wreck of the schooner Saxon, with a cargo of yellow pine lumber, that had been run into by the steamship Leo. Captain Brown towed the Saxon to the Erie Basin.

== Death ==
On June 18, 1885, Brown, age 75, died at his home in Brooklyn, New York, after getting frostbite in his left foot, which turned gangrene.

== Honors ==
For his services to the America's Cup, he was inducted into the America's Cup Hall of Fame in 1999.
