= William H. Brown (shipbuilder) =

American shipbuilder (1803–1855)

- Born: June 16, 1803; Stamford, Connecticut, U.S.
- Died: October 27, 1855 (aged 52); New York City, U.S.
- Occupation: shipbuilder
- Spouse: Elizabeth Jennings
- Children: 2

William H. Brown (June 16, 1803 – October 27, 1855) was an American shipbuilder during the 19th century. He built yachts, paddle steamers and steamboats. He was one of the first shipbuilders in the country and had his business for more than thirty years, having built over 300 vessels. He built the yacht America, which was the first winner of the America's Cup; the paddle steamer SS Arctic; and the sidewheel steamer Pacific, as well as other fine ships.

== Early life ==
William H. Brown was born in Stamford, Connecticut on June 16, 1803. He was the son of Doctor William H Brown (1766–1813) and Elizabeth Leeds (1771–1851). He came to New York when he was a young man. He married Elizabeth "Eliza" Jennings (1804–1890). They had two children, William Henry Austin Brown (1839–1911) and Arthur J. Brown (1831–1900).

== Career ==
Brown was well known for building fast and seaworthy yachts and schooners. He was one of the first shipbuilders in the country and had his business for more than thirty years, building over 300 vessels. Brown was an apprentice at the shipyard of Adam and Noah Brown (no relation). He built towboats and barges for use on the Hudson River. He later established the William H. Brown shipyard at the foot of Twelfth Street, on the East River in New York City.

In 1849, Brown hired George Steers as his chief loftsman at the Brown shipyard. Steers supervised the construction of schooners such as the yacht America.

In 1850, Brown became associated with Edward Knight Collins, the American shipping magnate. He built two vessels for the Collins Line, the Atlantic and Arctic. The contract was worth almost $1.5 million.

Brown was associated with John Englis. After Brown retired from shipbuilding in 1853, Englis opened his own shipyard at the foot of East 10th Street, New York under his own name.

== Notable ships ==
=== America ===
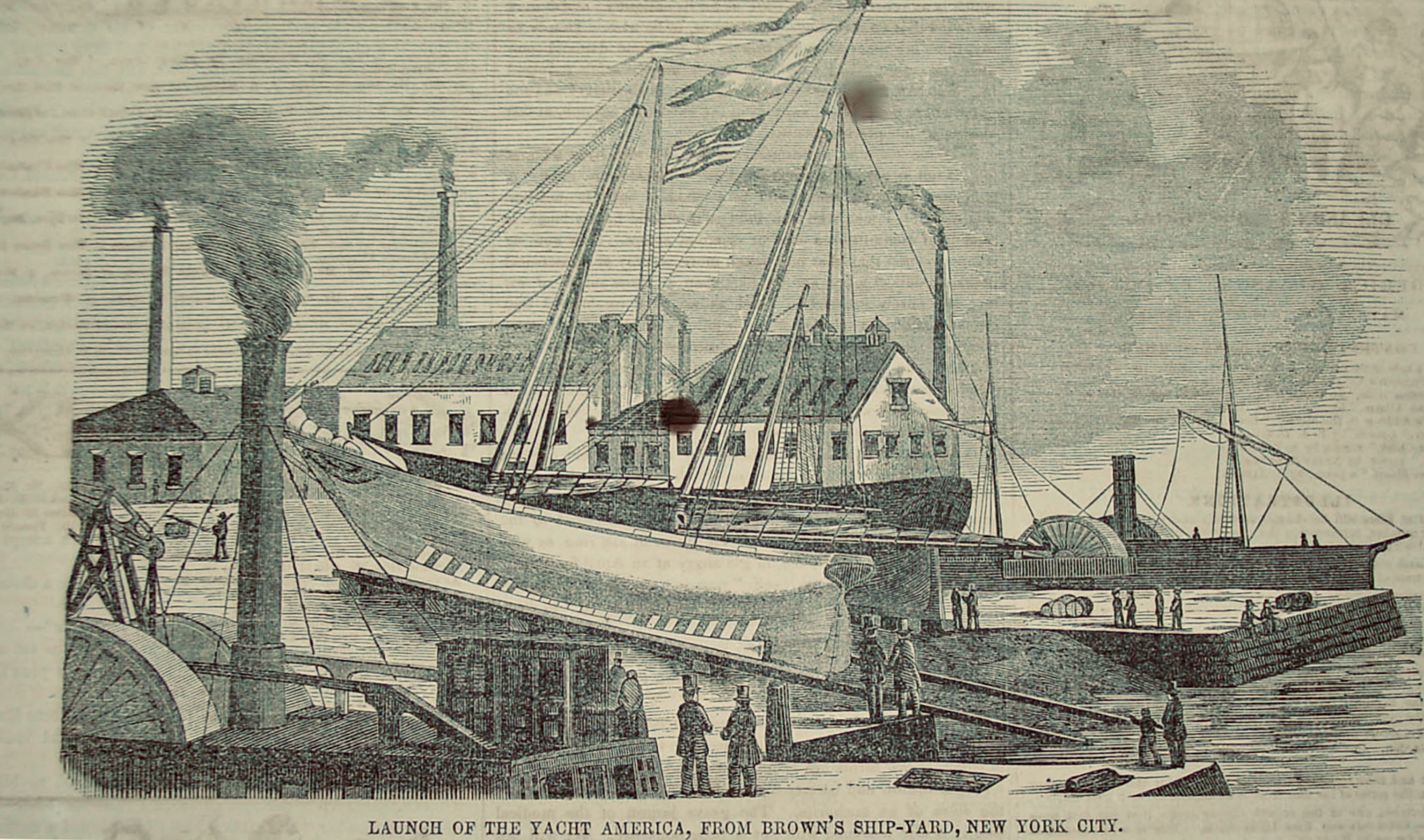
Launch of Yacht America from William H. Brown's shipyard.

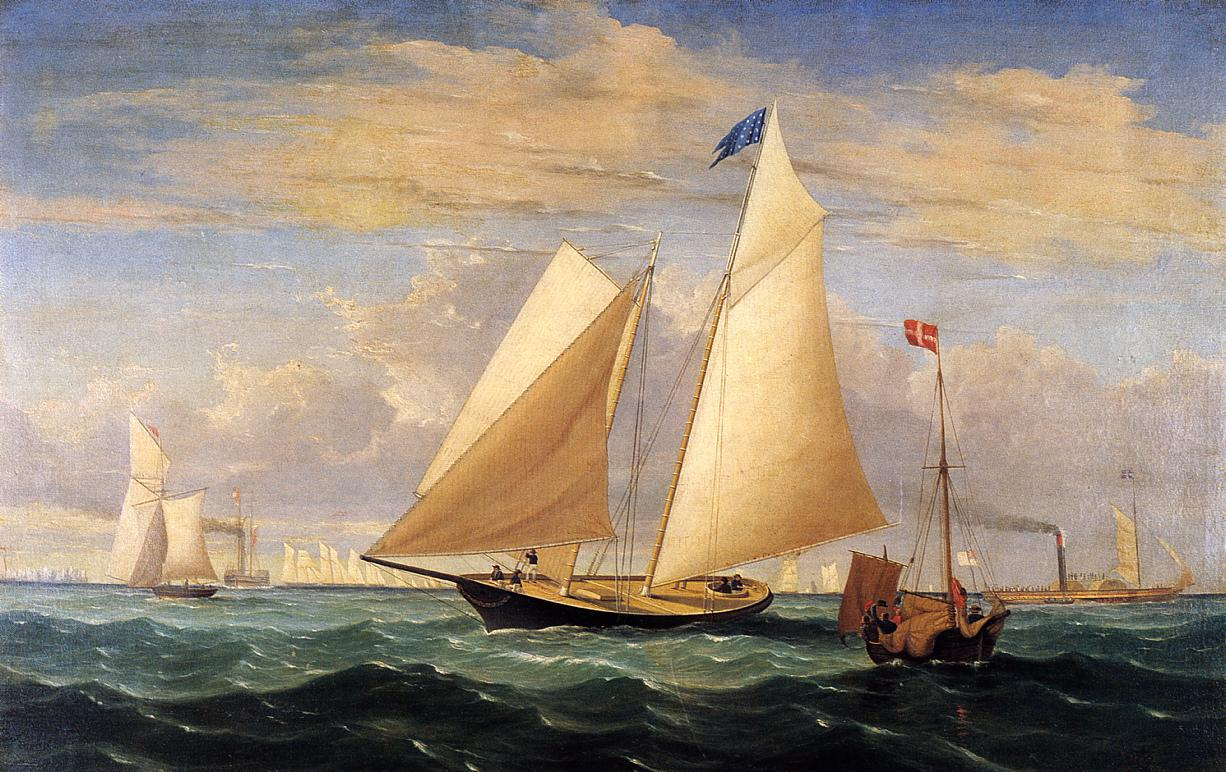
Yacht 'America' Winning the International Race, Fitz Henry Lane, 1851.

Brown built the racing yacht America in 1850–1851 under contract by a syndicate of New York yachtsmen, including Commodore John Cox Stevens of the New York Yacht Club. Stevens employed the services of Brown and his chief designer, George Steers. On November 15, 1850, Brown wrote a letter to Stevens offering to build him the yacht for $30,000 under the condition that Hamilton Wilkes, as umpire, would make several trial races to decide if she was the fastest vessel in the United States. Stevens later accepted the proposal and the yacht was purchased on June 17, 1851.

The America was launched on May 3, 1851, from the Brown shipyard, near Eleventh Street, East River, New York. America was the first winner of the America's Cup international sailing trophy. American painter Fitz Henry Lane did marine paintings of the yacht America. The painting "The Yacht America Winning the International Race" was done in 1851.

=== SS Arctic ===
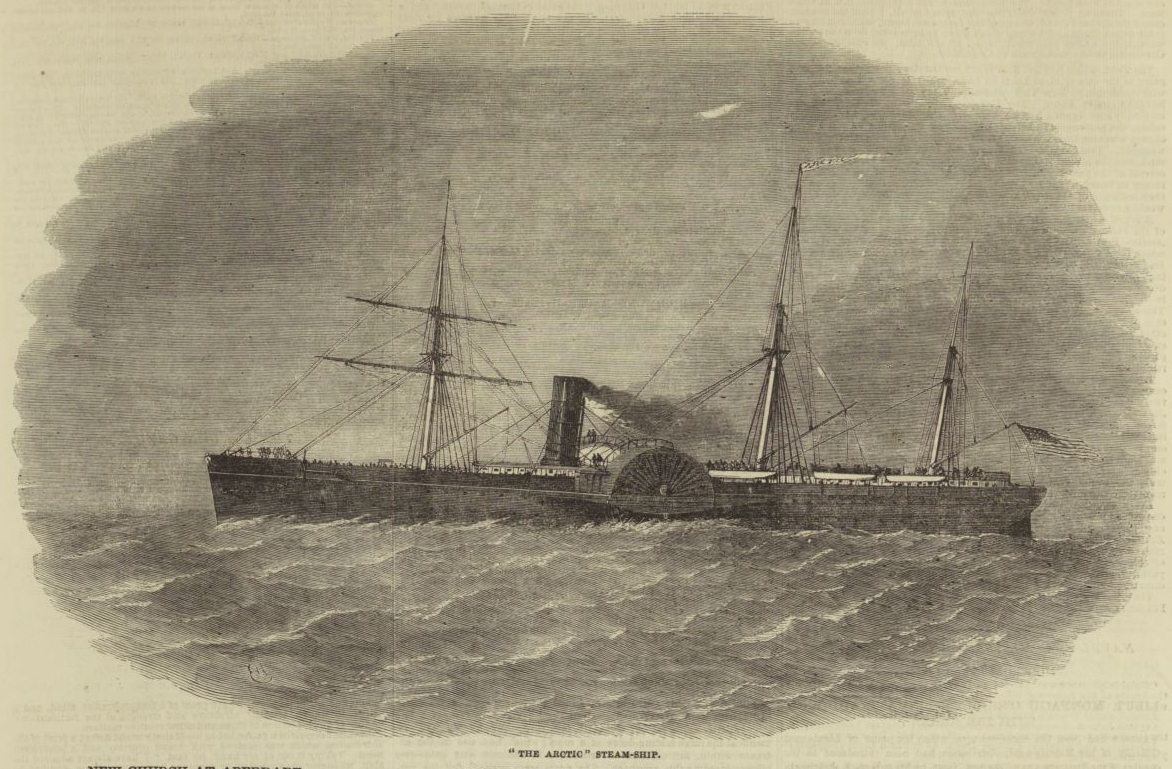
The SS Arctic paddle steamship.

The SS Arctic was a paddle steamer of the Collins Line, was built by the William H. Brown shipyard and designed by George Steers. She was launched on January 28, 1850, from Brown's yard on New York's East River, before 30,000 spectators. According to a press account, she was "the most stupendous vessel ever constructed in the United States, or the world, since the patriarchal days of Noah." She operated a transatlantic passenger and mail steamship service during the 1850s. She was the largest of a fleet of four, built with the aid of U.S. government subsidies to challenge the transatlantic supremacy of the British-backed Cunard Line. During its four-year period of service, the ship was renowned both for its speed and for the luxury of its accommodation.

== Death ==
Brown died on October 27, 1855, at the age of 52 in New York City. He was buried at the Fairfield East Cemetery in Fairfield, Connecticut, Connecticut.

== Post death ==
Brown had a partnership with Cornelius Vanderbilt in 1851 for the three vessels he built, which were the Pacific, Independence and Sea Bird under the steamship line between New York and San Francisco by way of Nicaragua. On June 10, 1895, a suit against the Vanderbilt was brought by Brown's son, William H. A. Brown, who was the administrator of his estate. The claim was for $2,000,000 when Vanderbilt and Brown were in partnership and built several vessels together. During that time, Vanderbilt used Brown's ships had received profits from them, which he asked the court for an accounting. On August 27, 1899, the suit for millions settled for $5,000.

== See also ==
- List of sailboat designers and manufacturers
- List of shipbuilders and shipyards
