= George Steers and Co =

George Steers & Co was a 19th-century shipyard company at Greenpoint, Long Island, New York.

== Company history ==
=== Hathorne & Steers ===
In 1843, George Steers went into partnership with William Hathorne, under the name of Hathorne & Steers, at the foot of North First street, in Williamsburg, Brooklyn. They designed and built several boats including the pilot boat Mary Taylor, with a radical new design in a schooner. The firm was closed in 1849. George then went into partnership with his brothers.

=== James and George Steers shipyard ===
In 1850, James Rich Steers and George Steers started the firm George & James R. Steers. inheriting from a naval architecture tradition. The father Henry Steers was already a naval architect in England. The company was located in Greenpoint, Long Island, New York.

They designed in 1851 the America for John C. Stevens to win the Queen's Cup at the annual regatta of the London Royal Yacht Club. She cost about $23,000.

George Steers died on September 25, 1856. Jack Strickland, supervisor of the construction of the yacht America, was a foreman of the Steers shipyard.

=== Henry Steers shipyard ===
In 1857, Henry Steers, the son of James Rich Steers and the grandson of Henry Steers, started his shipyard in Greenpoint, Long Island, New York. He designed and built most of the boats of the Pacific Mail Steamship Company.

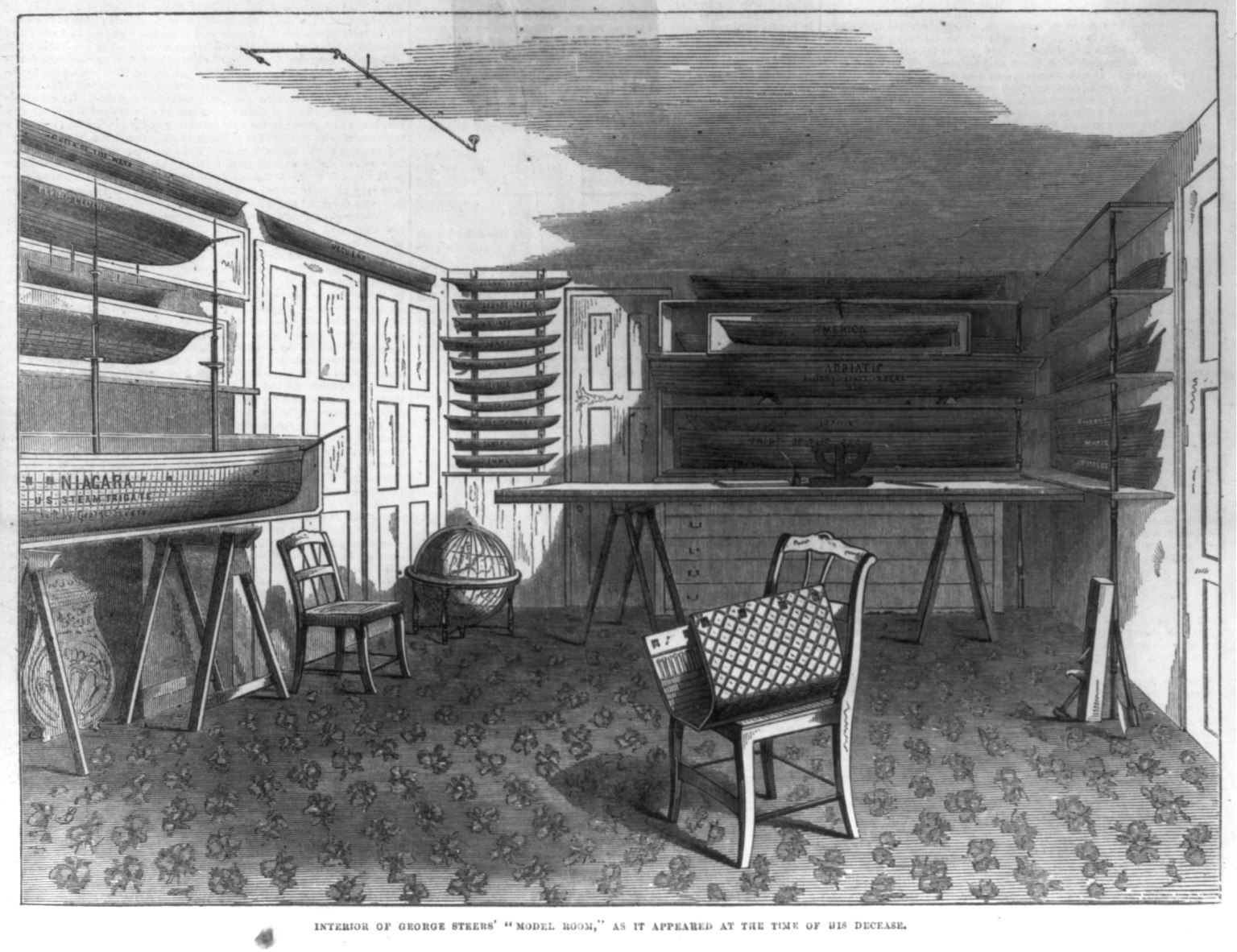
Interior of George Steers' model room, as it appeared at the time of his death in 1856, showing labelled models of ships and yachts designed or built at the yard

== List of built ships ==
=== by James and George ===
- 1849: SS Pacific
- 1855: SS Niagara
- 1856: SS Adriatic for Collins Line. (April 7, 1856).S.S. Adriatic.

=== by Henry Steers ===
- 1857: Charles H. Marshall
- 1859: Hu Quang, Che Kiang and Foh Kein
- 1865: SS Arizona January 19, 1865
- 1867: SS Great Republic for Pacific Mail Steamship Company
- 1869: SS America
- 1877: Massachusetts for the New York and Providence Line

== See also ==
- List of sailboat designers and manufacturers
