= George Steers =

American shipbuilder and designer

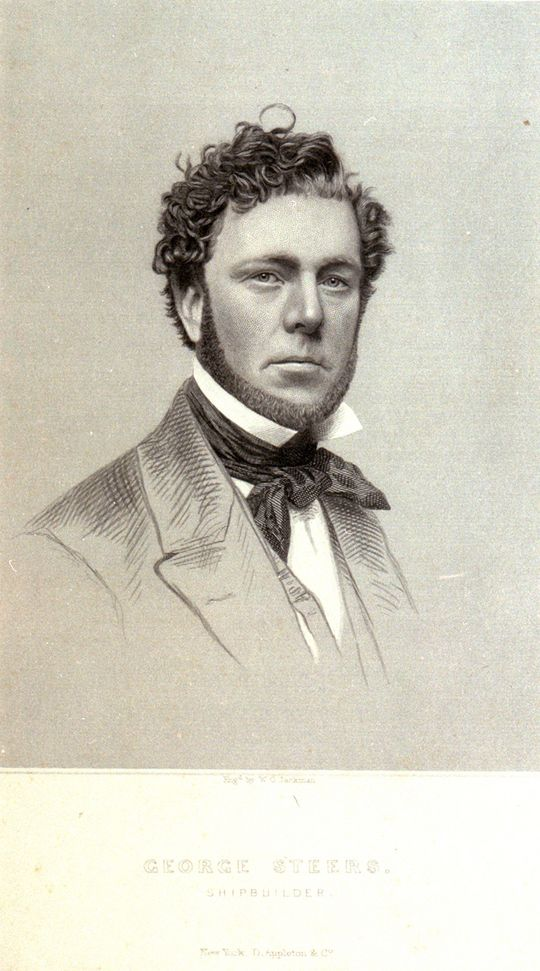
- Born: August 15, 1819; Washington, D.C.
- Died: September 25, 1856 (aged 37); Cranston, Rhode Island, US
- Occupation: shipbuilder

George Steers (August 15, 1819 – September 25, 1856) was a designer of yachts best known for the famous racing yacht America. He founded a shipyard with his brother, George Steers and Co, and died in an accident just as he was landing a major contract to build boats for the Russian Czar.

== Early life ==
George Steers was born in Washington, D.C., USA, in 1819. His father, Henry Steers, was engaged as Naval Constructor for the U.S. Government.

George never learned the trade of ship carpenter, but rather built vessels based on the design concepts he worked out for himself in his youth, growing up as a shipbuilder's son. He became a journeyman for William H. Brown, in whose service he assisted in building the Arctic and another of the Collins steamers.

== Designer of famous racing yacht America ==
Between 1841 and 1850, Steers built many yachts which were well known in their day. In 1845, Steers went into business with a partner under the name of Hathorne & Steers, at the foot of North First street, in Williamsburg, Brooklyn. In 1849, George Steers designed the pilot boat Mary Taylor, with a radical new design in a schooner. The firm was closed in 1849.

In 1850 he formed the firm George & James R. Steers with his brother. In 1850, Steers designed the pilot boat Moses H. Grinnell, No. 1. The Grinnell was the first pilot boat to have a long lean bow, which made it very fast. It was owned by George W. Blunt.

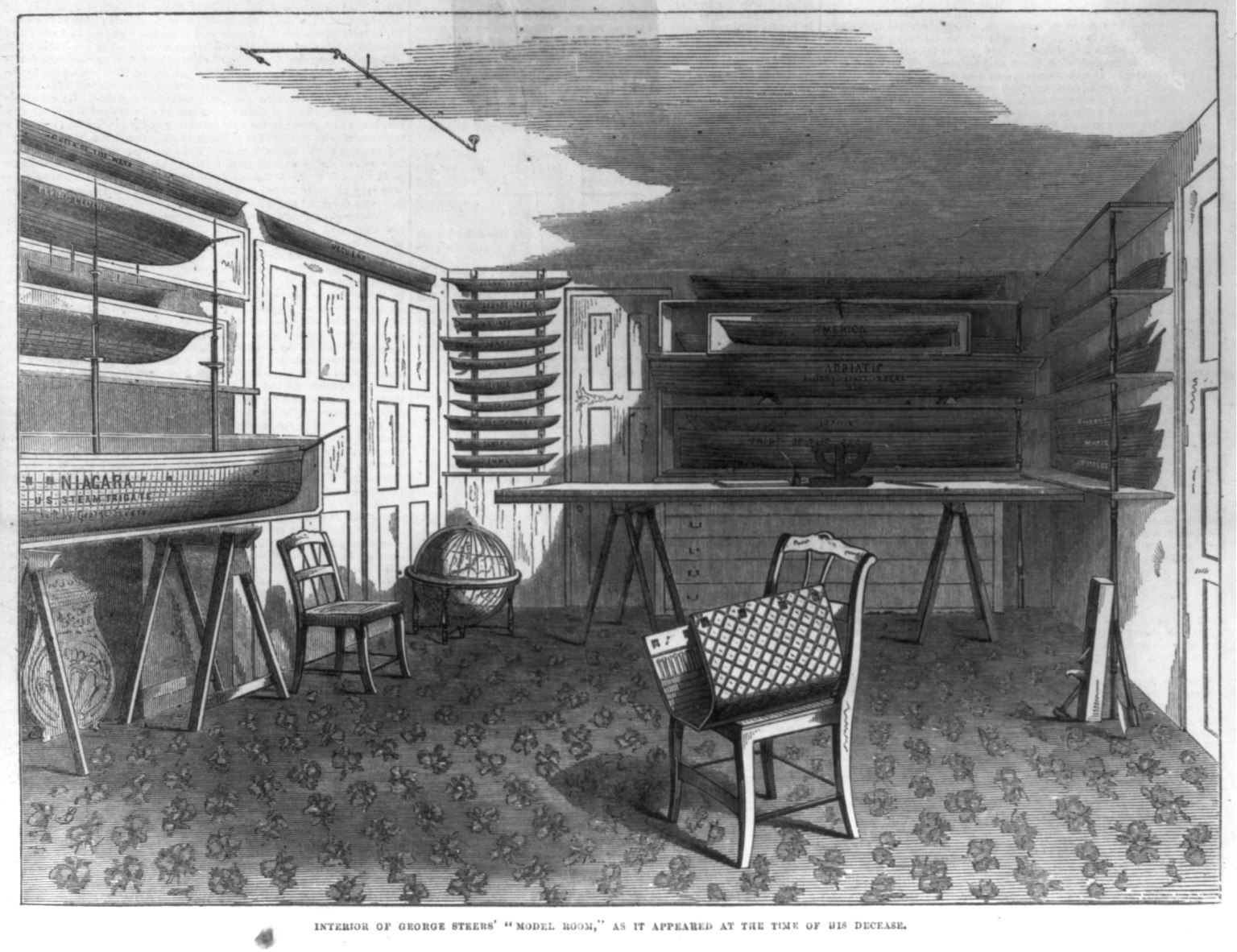
Interior of George Steers' model room, as it appeared at the time of his death in 1856, showing labelled models of ships and yachts designed or built at the yard

George Steers is perhaps best known as the designer of the most famous racing yacht of all time, the schooner yacht America (1851), for which the America's Cup is named. No doubt influenced by the Mary Taylor and Grinnell, and the ship designs of fellow New Yorker John W Griffiths, the aptly named America established the American naval architecture of the day.

He also built one full-sized ship, the clipper ship Sunny South, which was sold to foreign owners after a voyage around Cape Horn to San Francisco, and captured in the Mozambique Channel in 1860 with a cargo of over 800 slaves.

List of boats built by Steers include:

- William G. Hagstaff Pilot Boat (1841) built for the New Jersey pilots
- Mary Taylor, Pilot Boat (1849)
- George Steers Pilot Boat (1852)
- Phantom three-masted schooner (1853)
- Anthony B. Neilson Pilot Boat (1854)
- Julia Yacht (1855)
- Haze Yacht (1855)
- Widgeon Pilot Boat (1855)
- USS Niagara (1855) Steers last ship.

== Landed a large contract, but died young ==
On 25 September 1856, George Steers, while driving a pair of horses to Glen Cove, Long Island, in order to bring home (91 Cannon St.) his wife, who had been visiting, was thrown from his wagon and mortally wounded. He was only 37 years old. He had just negotiated for $1,000,000 worth of boats for the Czar of Russia. He left a son behind him.

A procession of 800 citizens was followed by lodges of the Masonic Order, including the Mariner's Lodge (400 men), and 70 carriages of friends and relatives. Steers is interred at Green-Wood Cemetery in Brooklyn, New York.
