= America (yacht) =

Racing yacht; 1st winner of the America's Cup

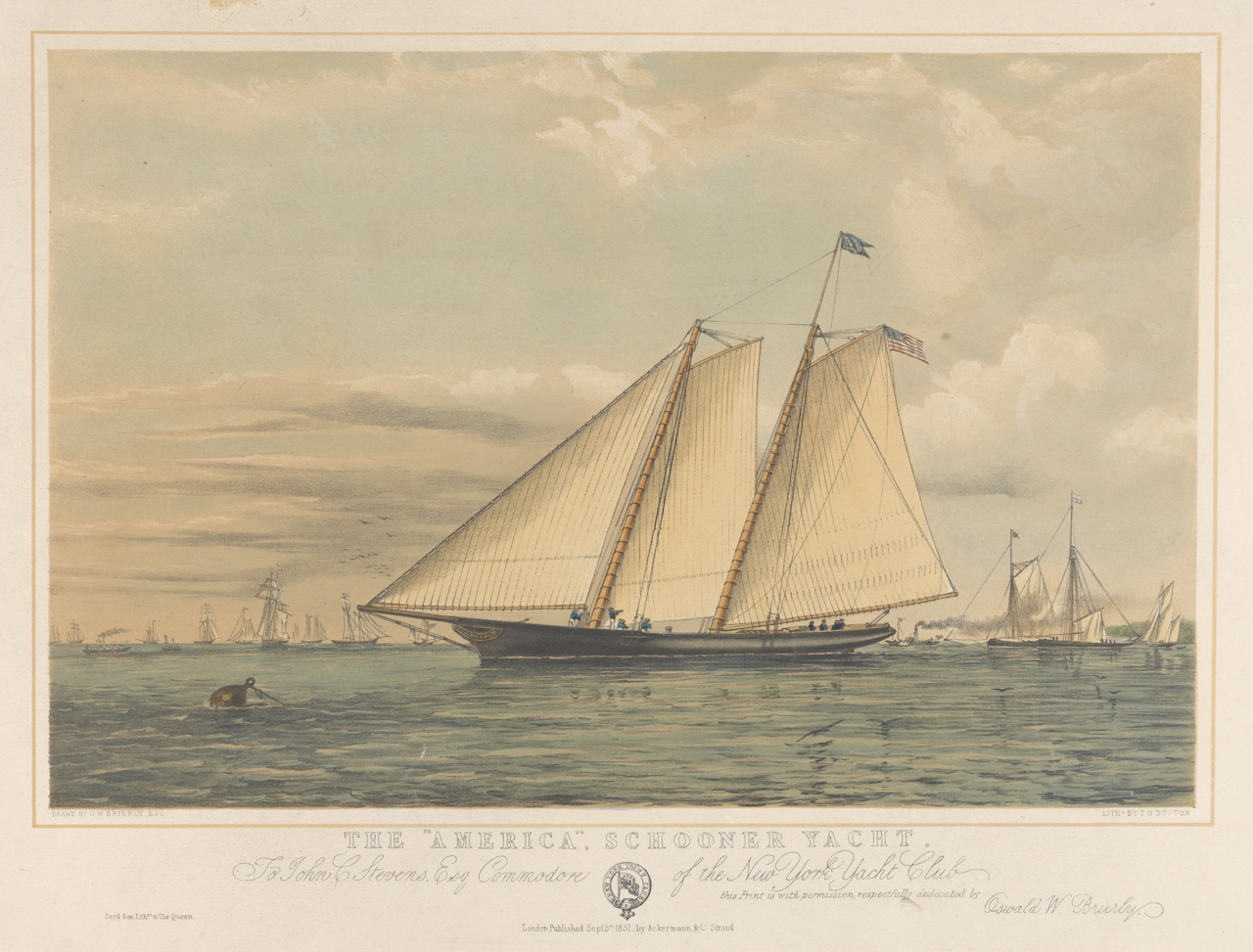
- The yacht America

History

United States
- Owner: John Cox Stevens (May 1851); John de Blaquiere, 4th Baron de Blaquiere (September 1851); Lord Templeton (1856)
- Operator: Richard "Dick" Brown
- Builder: William H. Brown
- Cost: $30,000
- Laid down: November 1850
- Launched: May 3, 1851
- Christened: America
- Renamed: Camilla (1856), America (1862)
- Honors and awards: R.Y.S. £100 Cup, 1851
- Fate: Scrapped, 1945

Confederate States of America
- Renamed: Memphis (1860)
- Fate: Scuttled (Jacksonville, 1862)

General characteristics
- Class & type: Gaff schooner
- Tonnage: 100; 208 Thames Measurement
- Length: LOA 101 ft 3 in (30.86 m); LWL 89 ft 10 in (27.38 m)
- Beam: 22 ft 10 in (6.96 m)
- Depth: 10 ft 11 in (3.33 m)
- Propulsion: Sail
- Sail plan: 5,296 sq ft (492.0 m^{2}) Upwind sail area
- Armament: Two 24-pounder & one 12-pounder
- Notes: Hull material: Wood (white oak, locust, cedar, and chestnut)

America was a 19th-century racing yacht and first winner of the America's Cup international sailing trophy.

On August 22, 1851, America won the Royal Yacht Squadron's 53-mile (85 km) regatta around the Isle of Wight by 18 minutes. The Squadron's "One Hundred Sovereign Cup" or "£100 Cup", sometimes mistakenly known in the United States the "One Hundred Guinea Cup", was later renamed after the original winning yacht.

== America's origins ==
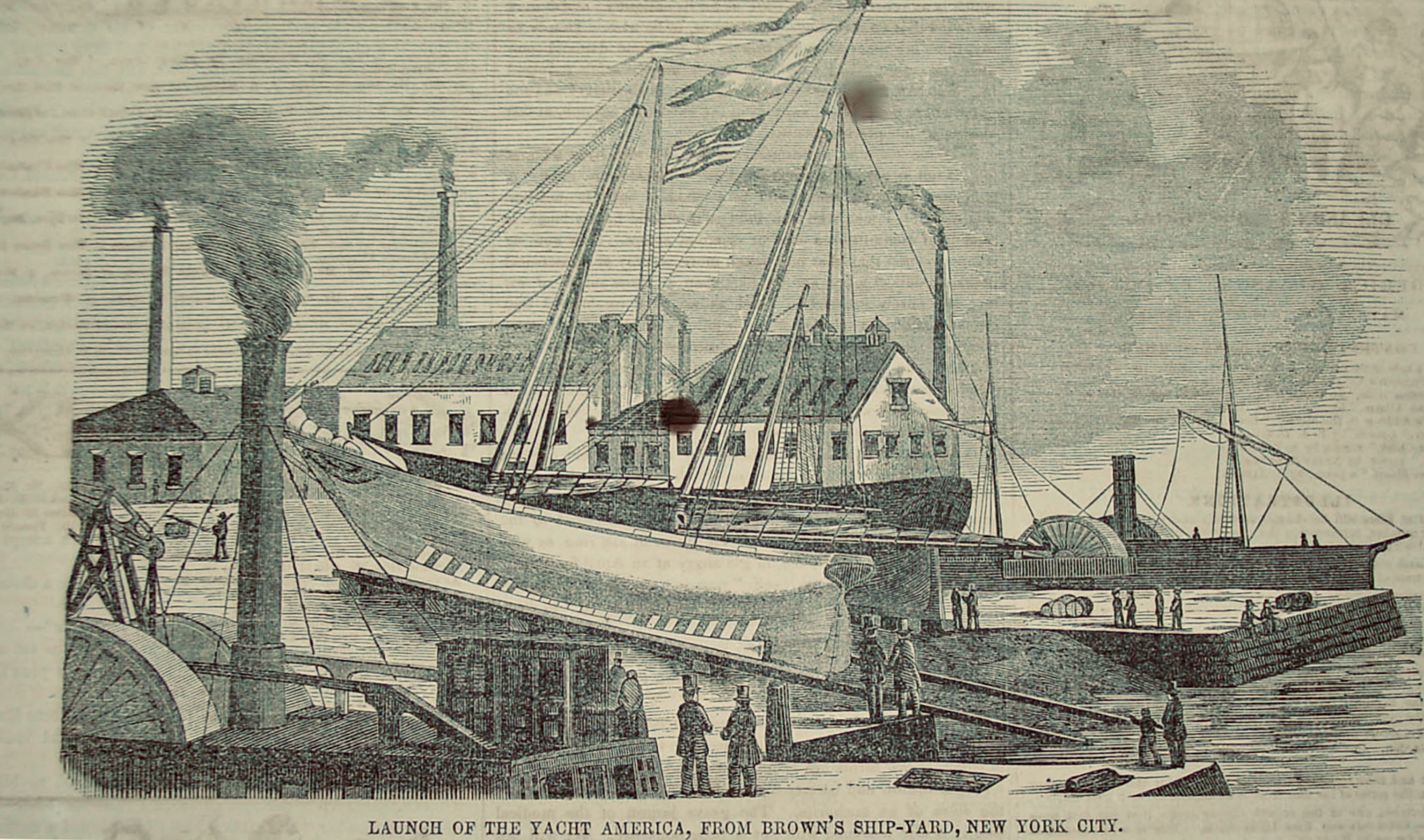
Launch of the yacht America from Brown's shipyard, New York City.

A syndicate of New York Yacht Club members, headed by NYYC charter member Commodore John Cox Stevens, with members Edwin A. Stevens, George Schuyler, Hamilton Wilkes, and J. Beekman Finley, built a yacht to sail to England. The purpose of this visit was twofold: to show off U.S. shipbuilding skill and make money through competing in yachting regattas. Stevens employed the services of the shipyard of William H. Brown and his chief designer, George Steers. She was launched on May 3, 1851, from the Brown shipyard, near Eleventh Street, East River, New York. She cost $30,000 (equivalent to $1,161,000 in 2025) .

== Designer ==
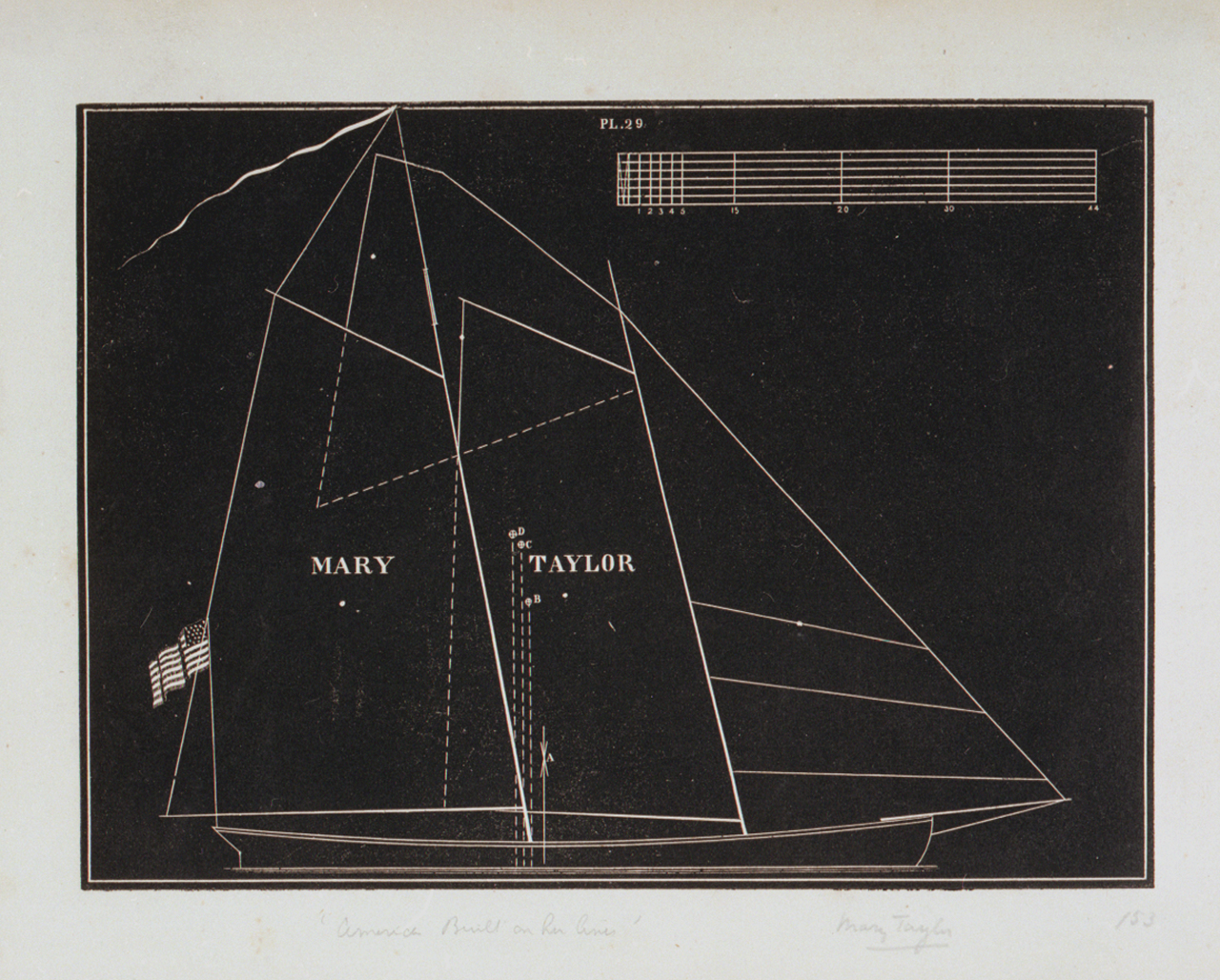
America was built on the lines of Mary Taylor (1849)

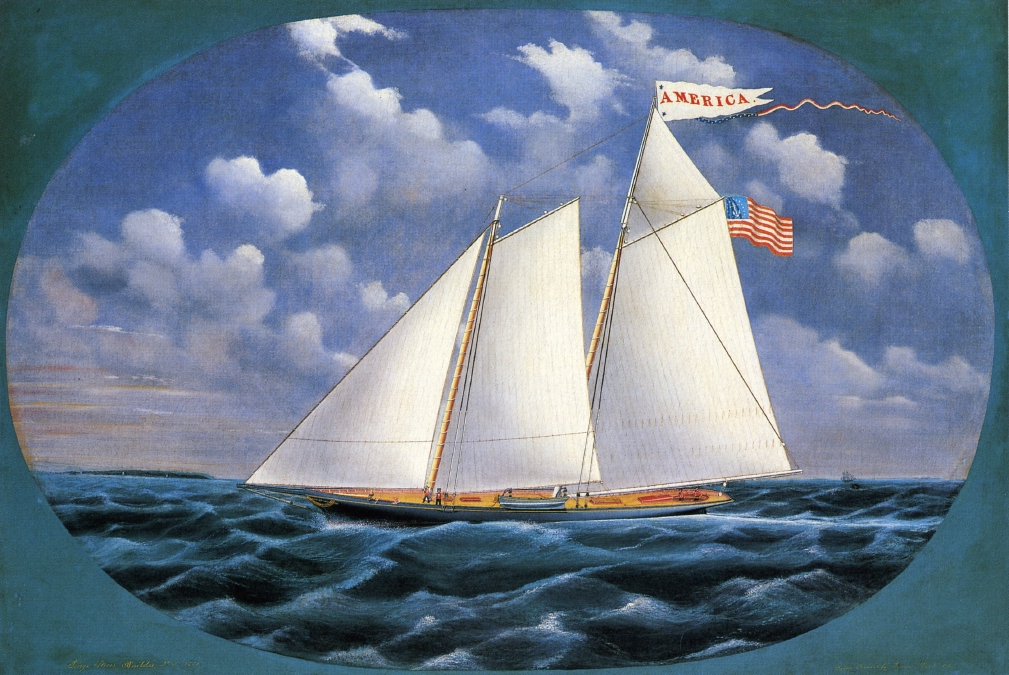
America 1851, by James Bard

America was designed by James Rich Steers and George Steers (1820–1856) (See George Steers and Co). Traditional "cod-head-and-mackerel-tail" design gave boats a blunt bow and a sharp stern with the widest point (the beam) placed one-third of the length aft of the bow. George Steers' pilot boat designs, however, had a concave clipper-bow with the beam of the vessel at midships. She was designed along the lines of the pilot boat Mary Taylor. As a result, his schooner-rigged pilot boats were among the fastest and most seaworthy of their day. They had to be seaworthy, for they met inbound and outbound vessels in any kind of weather. These vessels also had to be fast, for harbor pilots competed with each other for business. In addition to pilot boats, Steers designed and built 17 yachts, some which were favorites with the New York Yacht Club.

== Captain ==
America was captained by Richard Brown, who was also a skilled member of the Sandy Hook Pilots group, renowned worldwide for their expertise in manoeuvering the shoals around New York Harbor. They were highly skilled racers as a result of impromptu races between pilots to ships in need of pilot services. Brown had sailed aboard the pilot boat Mary Taylor, designed by George Steers, of whom he was a personal friend. He chose as first mate Nelson Comstock, a newcomer to yacht racing.

== Events leading to the race ==
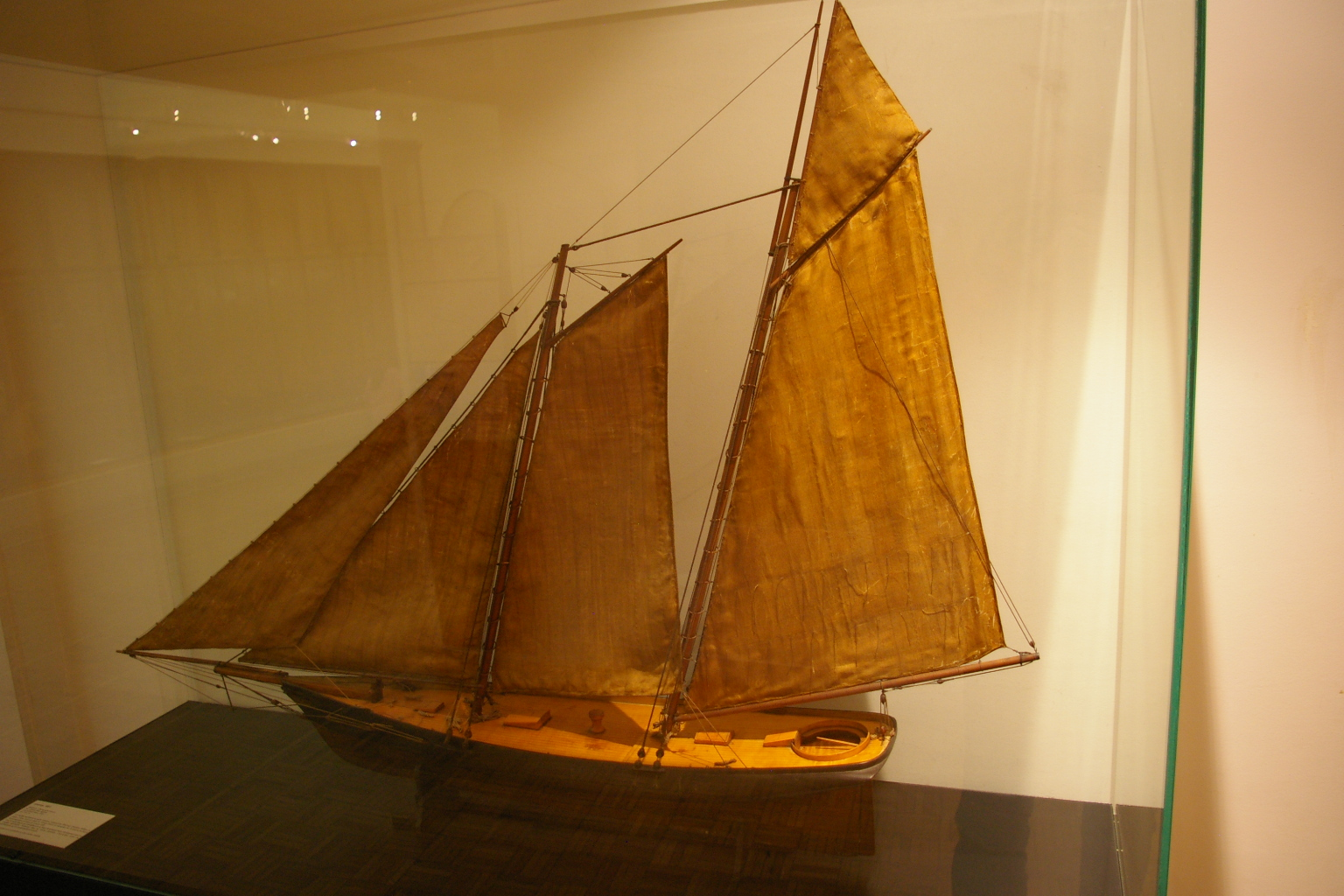
America model in Musée de la Marine.

Crewed by Brown and eight professional sailors, with George Steers, his older brother James, and James' son George as passengers, America left New York on June 21, 1851, and arrived at Le Havre on July 11. They were joined there by Commodore Stevens. After drydocking and repainting America left for Cowes, Isle of Wight, on July 30. While there the crew enjoyed the hospitality of the Royal Yacht Squadron while Stevens searched for someone who would race against his yacht.

The British yachting community had been following the construction of America with interest and perhaps some trepidation. When America arrived on the Solent on July 31 there was one yacht, Laverock, that appeared for an impromptu race. The accounts of the race are contradictory: a British newspaper said Laverock held her own, but Stevens later reported that America beat her handily. Whatever the outcome, it seemed to have discouraged other British yachtsmen from challenging America to a match. She never raced until the last day of the Royal Yacht Squadron's annual members-only regatta for which Queen Victoria customarily donated the prize. Because of America's presence, a special provision was made to "open to all nations" a race of 53 miles (85 km) 'round the Isle of Wight, with no reservation for time allowance.

== The race ==
The race was held on August 22, 1851, with a 10:00 AM start for a line of seven schooners and another line of eight cutters. America had a slow start due to a fouled anchor and was well behind when she finally got under way. Within half an hour however, she was in 5th place and gaining.

The eastern shoals of the Isle of Wight are called the Nab Rocks. Traditionally, races would sail around the east (seaward) side of the lightship that marked the edge of the shoal, but one could sail between the lightship and the mainland if they had a knowledgeable pilot. America had such a pilot and he took her down the west (landward) side of the lightship. After the race a contestant protested this action, but was overruled because the official race rules did not specify on which side of the lightship a boat had to pass.

This tactic put America in the lead, which she held throughout the rest of the race. At one point the jib boom broke due to a crew error, but it was replaced in fifteen minutes. On the final leg of the race the yacht Aurora closed but was 18 minutes behind when America finished shortly after 6:00 PM. Legend has it that while watching the race, Queen Victoria asked who was second, and received the famous reply: "There is no second, your Majesty."

== Subsequent owners ==
John Cox Stevens and the syndicate from the New York Yacht Club owned the America from the time that she was launched on May 3, 1851, until ten days after she won the regatta that made her famous. On September 1, 1851, the yacht was sold to John de Blaquiere, 4th Baron de Blaquiere. In late July 1852, America ran aground at Portsmouth, Hampshire and was damaged. De Blaquiere raced her only a few times before selling her in 1856 to Henry Montagu Upton, 2nd Viscount Templetown, who renamed her Camilla but failed to use or maintain her. In 1858, she was sold to Henry Sotheby Pitcher, a shipbuilder in Northfleet, Kent. He rebuilt Camilla and sold her to Henry Edward Decie in 1860, who brought her back to the United States. Decie sold the ship to the Confederate States of America the same year for use as a blockade runner in the American Civil War, though he remained aboard as captain. The yacht was renamed Camilla and carried Major Edward Clifford Anderson the Secretary of War in England, and Navy lieutenant James Heyward North on a secret mission to purchase weapons and supplies for the Confederacy, and to ascertain the loyalty of Captain Caleb Huse who was already in England. Heyward was specifically tasked by Secretary of the Navy Stephen R. Mallory to purchase ready built ironclad vessels. They departed Savannah, on May 22, 1861, running the blockade and arrived in Queesntown on June 22.

In 1862, she was scuttled in Dunns Creek, north of Crescent City, Florida when Union troops took the city of Jacksonville. She was raised, repaired, and renamed America by the Union and served the United States Navy on the blockade until May 1863. She was armed with three smoothbore bronze cannon designed by John A. Dahlgren and cast at the Washington Navy Yard. A 12-pounder was located on the bow and two 24-pounders were placed amidships. She was assigned to the federal blockading squadron off Charleston, South Carolina, and was on patrol the night of March 19, 1863, when she spotted the smoke of a blockade runner near Dewees Inlet, South Carolina. She immediately launched colored signal flares to alert the rest of the fleet. The runner proved to be the CSS Georgiana, which was described as the most powerful Confederate cruiser then afloat. America's action ultimately resulted in the Georgiana's wreck and destruction. Georgiana was the most important vessel to be captured or destroyed by the federal blockade. In 1863 America became a training ship at the United States Naval Academy. On August 8, 1870, the Navy entered her in the America's Cup race at New York Harbor, where she finished fourth.

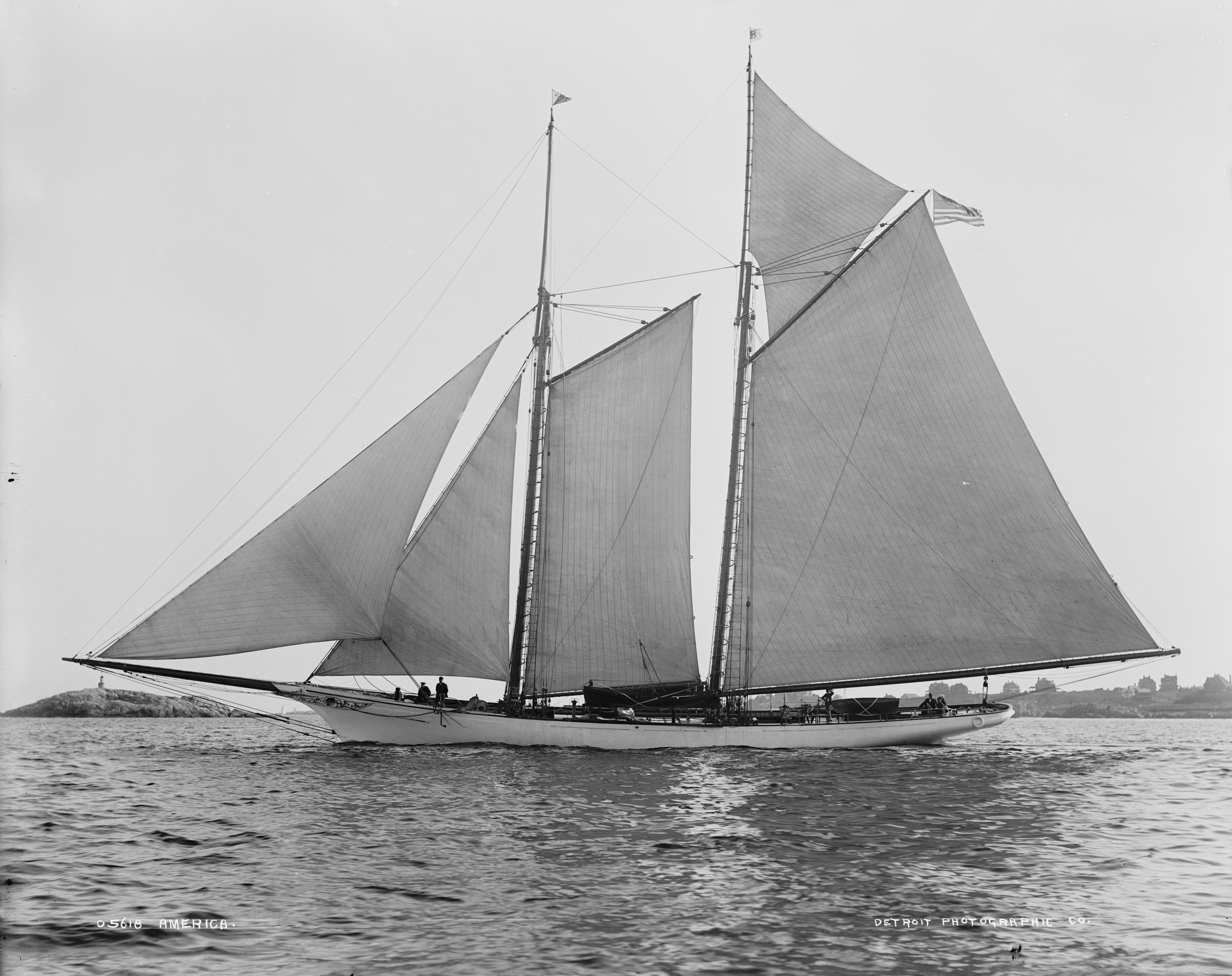
America with 1887 rig

America remained in the Navy until 1873, when she was sold to Benjamin Butler for $5,000. Butler hired James H. Reid who was in charge of her for sixteen years. They raced and maintained her well, commissioning a rebuild by Donald McKay in 1875. Butler and Reid sailed a race with the schooner Resolute, off the Isles of Shoals and won the race. Later, she sailed a squadron race and won. In the winter 1881, when she was lengthened 6 1/2 feet, Reid and Butler sailed her on a cruise to the West Indies returning to Boston in 1882. A total refit of the rig was done in 1885 by Edward Burgess to keep her competitive. Butler died in 1893 and his son Paul inherited the schooner, but he had no interest in her and gave her to his nephew Butler Ames in 1897. Ames reconditioned America and used her occasionally for racing and casual sailing until 1901, when she fell into disuse and disrepair.

America was sold to a company headed by Charles Foster in 1917, and in 1921 was sold to the America Restoration Fund, which donated her to the U.S. Naval Academy in Annapolis.

=== Fate ===
In 1923 America was given the hull designation of IX-41 by the US Navy. ("IX" being the designation for "unclassified miscellaneous".) She was not maintained at the Naval Academy either and became seriously decayed by 1940. The shed which housed America collapsed during a heavy snowstorm on March 29, 1942. The remains of the shed and ship were scrapped and burned in 1945.

America was one of only four ships in service in the U.S. Navy in both the Civil War and World War II, along with the USS Constitution, USS Constellation and USS Hartford.

== Legacy ==
The New York Yacht Club acquired several relics from America after her destruction. These include her transom eagle, rudder post and one of her masts. The mast serves as the flag pole for the club's summer station in Newport, Rhode Island.

== Replicas ==
The first replica of America was built by Goudy & Stevens Shipyard in Boothbay, Maine, and launched in 1967. She was built for Rudolph Schaefer Jr., owner of F. & M. Schaefer Brewing Co. Construction was supervised by her first skipper, Newfoundland born Capt. Lester G. Hollett.

A second replica of America was built in 1995 by Scarano Boatbuilding of Albany, New York for Ray Giovannoni, and was operated by him for commercial events until his death. It had several modifications from the original design including widening the beam by 4 feet to accommodate interior layouts. The original design had only one lantern (skylight) so three were added to bring light into the interior of the yacht. The yacht spent several years in Key West, Florida, and operated between Key West and New York City seasonally for the company Classic Harbor Line. In 2006 she was purchased by Troy Sears' company, Next Level Sailing, and her home port was moved to San Diego, California. In 2007 America was invited to Spain to help promote America's Cup racing and she was exhibited in June 2011 in San Francisco Bay in concert with exploratory preparations by the Oracle Racing team for the 2013 America's Cup race, which was held within the bay. In 2015 and 2016 she toured both US coasts and the Caribbean, again to promote America's Cup racing. During the interim and since then she has run whale watching and charter trips out of San Diego.

A third replica was built in Varna, Bulgaria in 2005. Christened Skythia, the boat's home port later was Rostock, Germany, where she was used for commercial charter.
