= Dewees Island =

Island of South Carolina, United States

Coordinates: 32°50′25″N 79°42′59″W

- Location within South Carolina

Geography
- Location: Atlantic Ocean
- Adjacent to: Copahee Sound
- Area: 485.623 ha (1,200.00 acres)

Administration
- United States
- State: South Carolina
- County: Charleston

Additional information
- Official website: http://deweesislandsc.com

Dewees Island is a barrier island, located approximately 11 miles north of Charleston, and has an area of 1.875 square miles. The inlet between it and the Isle of Palms is shown on early maps as Spence's Inlet, and is today called Dewees Inlet. The island is private, consisting only of residential properties and a nature preserve. Dewees is accessible by private ferry or private boat.

== History ==
Likely one of five original hunting islands of the Sewee Indigenous Americans, Dewees Island was under British proprietorship until it was eventually owned by Thomas Cary in 1700. In 1702 Carey sold Sessions Island (now Capers Island) to William Capers and in 1706 Carey sold Bull Island to John Collins. Dewees Island was then known as Timicau Island, and somewhere between those two sales, Thomas Cary sold the island to Roger Player, where it passed through a succession of owners, including Arnoldus Vanderhorst. During that time, the island was known as Vanderhorst Island. Sometime after Vanderhorst's death in 1765, the island was conveyed to Cornelius Dewees, of Dutch origin, who changed the name to Dewees Island. Over time the island has been home to Native Americans, Revolutionary War soldiers, and Civil War blockades. The island has a World War II submarine tower, built by the United States Army Corps of Engineers. During the 1800s, Dewees Island residents were primarily represented as oystermen and farmers in census records and in the later half of the 19th century rice planters began farming on Dewees. Before 1898 land ownership on Dewees Island was complicated by wars, legal disputes, and uncertainty, until 1898 when John Murphy, a Charleston contractor and alderman, purchased land on the island and became the single owner. On Dewees Murphy grew artichokes, cane for chairs, and raised pigs. Contracted workers harvested oysters and clams and Murphy owned a steamship, the "Undine", which he used to visit the island. A family (Huyler) lived on the island for much of 1925–52. According to the Dewees Island Property Owners Association (the "POA"), "The island was purchased by RS Reynolds in 1956 and used as a hunting retreat...[until] an investor partnership bought Dewees in 1972..."

The first modern residential homes on Dewees were built during the 1980s on the south end of the island by the Royalls, R. "Bobby" Kennedy IV, and others. After the island was devastated by Hurricane Hugo, in 1989, the investors invited John Knott to consider further development, and Island Preservation Partnership ("IPP") was formed in 1991. The first new homes were built in the 1990s and the island was ceded to the Property Owners in 2007 and has since been managed by the POA Board and the Dewees Utility Corporation (the "DUC"). As of 2020, the island has 150 home sites and very strict building codes requiring a "small footprint and very little clearing of natural vegetation." There are no restaurants or stores on Dewees Island.

== Transportation ==
The "Dewees Breeze" and "Dewees Islander" passenger-only ferries run between the Isle of Palms and Dewees Island, a 15 to 20 minute trip. The primary mode of transportation on Dewees is electric cars/golf carts; the use of gas-powered vehicles is prohibited, with exceptions for some work vehicles used for construction and maintenance.

== Governance ==
Dewees is a private island managed by the POA.

Water, sewer, garbage removal, recycling and a few other services are provided by the DUC.

== Tourism ==
Approximately 2,000 people visit Dewees Island each year. The visitors include owners, owners' guests, artists, and ecotourists on specially arranged tours.
