= Mary Taylor (pilot boat) =

Boston Pilot boat

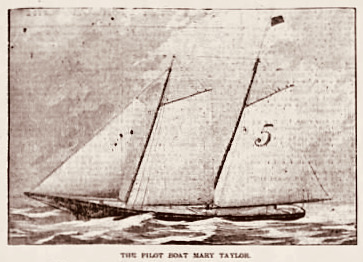
- New York pilot boat Mary Taylor

History

United States
- Name: Mary Taylor
- Namesake: Mary Taylor, popular New York actress
- Owner: New York Pilots
- Operator: Captain Richard Brown
- Builder: Hathorne & Steers shipyard
- Launched: 1849
- Out of service: November 10, 1863
- Fate: Sank at sea on November 10, 1863

General characteristics
- Class & type: schooner
- Tonnage: 75-tons TM
- Length: 67 ft 0 in (20.42 m)
- Beam: 17 ft 10 in (5.44 m)
- Depth: 7 ft 9 in (2.36 m)
- Propulsion: Sail

The Mary Taylor was a 19th-century yacht and Sandy Hook pilot boat, built at the Hathorne & Steers shipyard in 1849 for Captain Richard Brown. She was designed by George Steers with a new radical design with a long thin bow and wide stern, which made her faster than any other boat in her class. This design proved successful and led to the famous yacht America, which won the America's Cup in 1851. The Mary Taylor sank after colliding with the schooner Fairhaven in 1863. She was replaced by the Mary E. Fish.

== Construction and service ==
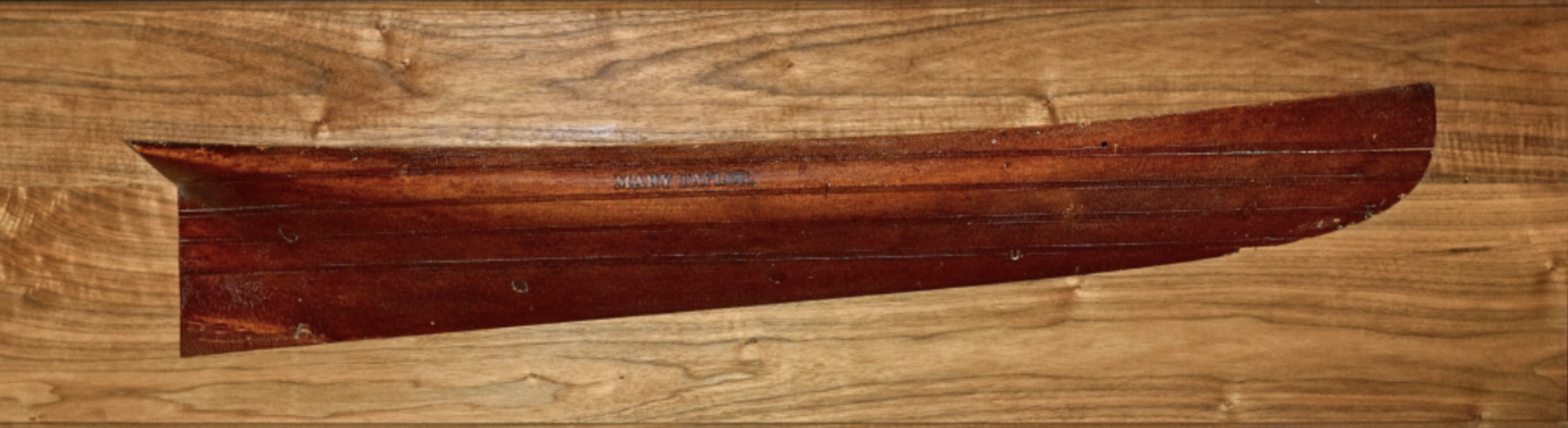
Mary Taylor pilot boat half model by George Steers.

New York pilot boat Mary Taylor, was built in early 1849 at the Hathorne & Steers shipyard, at the foot of North First street, in Williamsburg, New York. She was designed by George Steers for Captain Richard "Dick" Brown. Steers designed her with a new thin bow and wide stern, which made her faster than any boat of her size. Fitting with the new design, Brown named her after a scandalous New York actress Mary Taylor, known for dancing the bawdy polka. The schooner was a big success, out sailing other boats in the pilot fleet. The Mary Taylor was followed the next year by the Moses H. Grinnell, which led to the famous yacht America, which won the America's Cup.

The following is from Steers about the Mary Taylor:

When George Steers laid the keel of the pilot boat, Mary Taylor, he engaged in advance to make a faster and steadier craft that had ever left the port of New York, and he succeeded exactly according to expectation. For encountering less resistance from the narrow bows, the vessel went faster, experienced no corresponding strain, and suffered no more in the storm than in the breeze.

The sail number "5" was painted as a large number on the mainsail identified the boat as belonging to the Sandy Hook Pilots. Based on this number, the Mary Taylor No. 5, appeared in several prominent newspapers from 1849 to 1863. She was gaff rigged, two-masted schooner, 67 feet long; 17.10 feet beam; and 7.9 feet in depth. Without the success of the Mary Taylor, the America may not have been built.

A half model of the Mary Taylor's starboard side was made in 1849 by George Steers. The model is a representation of the boats's molded lines with a long thin bow and plum stern. Inscribed in black letters are the words "MARY TAYLOR."

== End of service ==
On November 10, 1863, the U. S. steam transport Fairhaven, came into collision with the Mary Taylor, No. 5, near Barnegat, New Jersey causing her to sink. A crew of six on board were saved.

== See also ==
- List of Northeastern U. S. Pilot Boats
