= Idler (yacht) =

Schooner yacht Idler

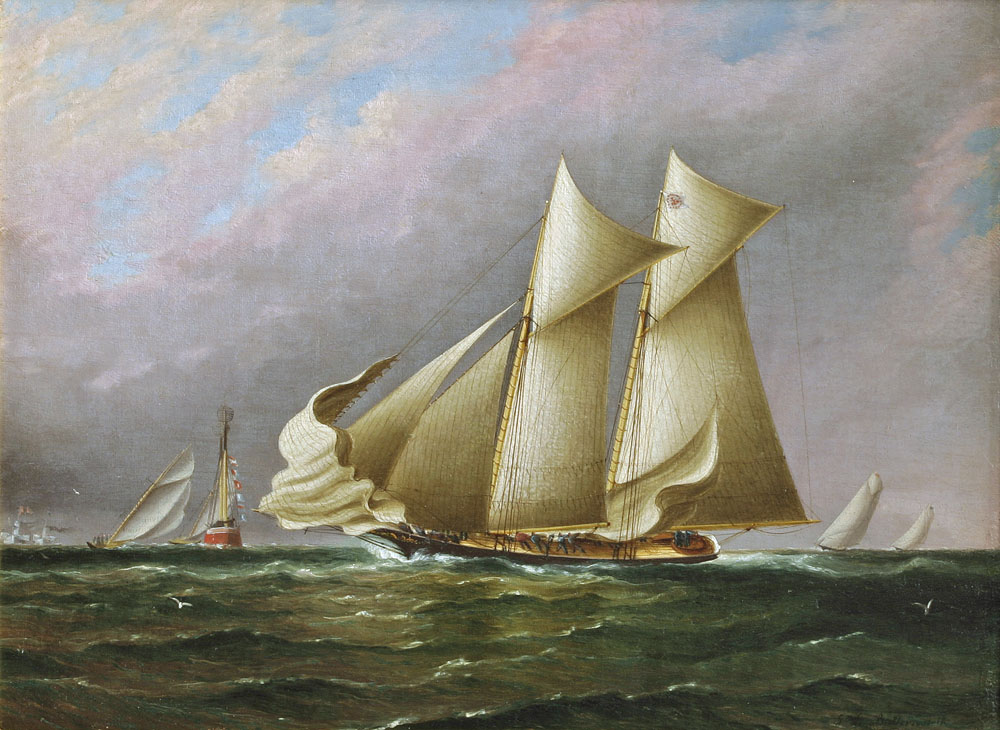
- Schooner Yacht Idler at the New York Yacht Club Regatta by James E. Buttersworth.

History

United States
- Name: Idler
- Namesake: John Parkinson Idler
- Owner: Thomas C. Durant (1864-1872); Samuel J. Colgate (1872-1879); Archie J. Fisher (1879-1889); John Cudahy (1889-1899); James C. Corrigan (1899-1900)
- Builder: F. Colgate, Fairhaven, Connecticut
- Launched: 1864
- Out of service: July 7, 1900
- Honors and awards: America’s Cup defense in 1870
- Fate: Sank 1900

General characteristics
- Class & type: Schooner
- Type: schooner-yacht
- Tons burthen: 85
- Length: 95 ft 7 in (29.13 m)
- Beam: 26 ft 6 in (8.08 m)
- Draft: 11 ft 0 in (3.35 m)
- Propulsion: schooner sail
- Sail plan: 1,934.6 sq ft (179.73 m^{2}) sail area

The Idler was a schooner-yacht built in 1864 by Samuel Hartt Pook of Fairhaven, Connecticut. She was one of the fastest yachts in the New York yachting fleet. Idler came in second place in the America’s Cup in 1870. She was sold times before she capsized and sank in 1900.

== Construction ==
The Idler was a centreboard schooner-rigged yacht designed by naval architect Samuel Hartt Pook and constructed in the summer of 1864 either by F. Colgate or Joshua Brown in Fairhaven, Connecticut. According to the Record of American and Foreign Shipping, her original dimensions were 95.7 feet (29.2 m) in length; 22.6 feet (6.9 m) breadth of beam; 11 feet (3.4 m) depth of hold; and 85 tons (Thames Measurement).

Below deck, Idler had a large lounge, and four private staterooms. There were several storerooms and closets, and more than one toilet. Forward of the lounge was a galley, pantry, and large icebox. The crew berths were beneath the forecastle, and notably roomy.

Idler had a flush deck, her hull was painted black, and was notable for her particularly sleek lines. She was designed to handle heavy weather, and required a crew of eight.

== Service ==
=== New York Yacht Club races ===
Her first owner was railroad magnate Thomas C. Durant.

In August 1868, the Idler competed in the New York Yacht Club (NYYC) schooner and sloop race off Newport, Rhode Island. The race included the yachts Dauntless, Gracie, Magic, Widgeon, Phantom, Fleetwing, and other schooners and sloops. The course was from the northeast point of Block Island, rounding it from the north west, and returning to the same point.

In June 1869, the schooner Idler was in the annual June New York Yacht Club regatta. She raced against the Phantom, Alarm, Palmer, Slivie and other schooners and sloops. The course was from Owl's Head to the S.W. Split, then across to the Sandy Hook Lightship and back. The Idler came in first place with a time of 4 hours, 24 minutes, and 30 seconds. She won again in June 1870.

=== 1870 America's cup ===
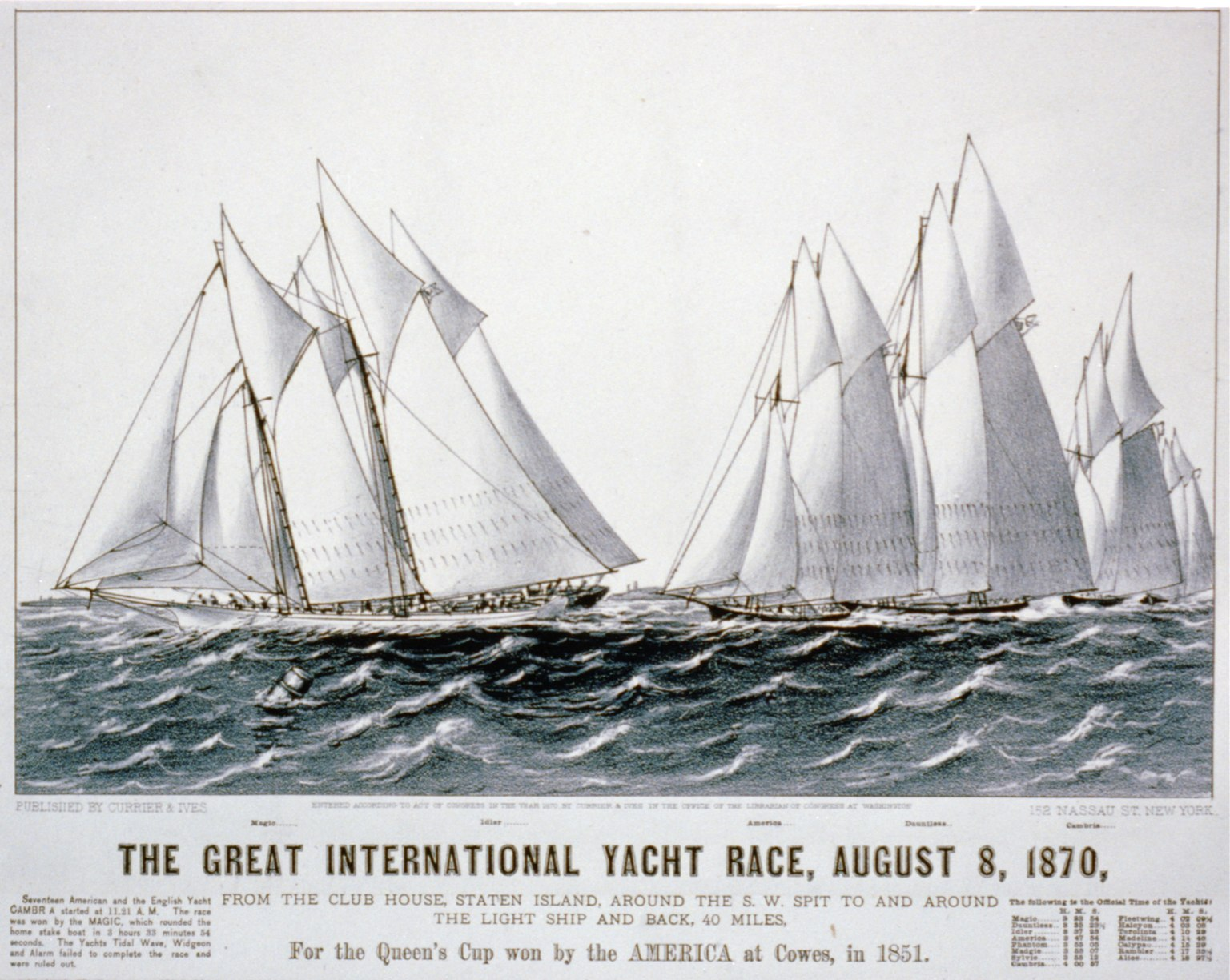
The 1870 America's Cup yacht race, August 8, 1870.

On August 8, 1870, the America's Cup race (also called the Queen's Cup) was held at New York Harbor. This was the first America's Cup to be hosted in the United States. The course started from the Staten Island anchorage of the New York Yacht Club, down through the Narrows, to the S.W. Split buoy, across to the Sandy Hook lightship, and then back to Staten Island. The race was won by the Franklin Osgood's Magic with Durant's Idler finishing in second. There were 16 other competitors, including James Lloyd Ashbury's English yacht Cambria (which sailed to New York on behalf of the Royal Thames Yacht Club), and the American yachts Dauntless, Idler, Fleetwing, Phantom, America.

On June 21, 1871, Idler won the Cape May Challenge Cup sponsored by New York Herald publisher James Gordon Bennett Jr.

=== Colgate ownership ===
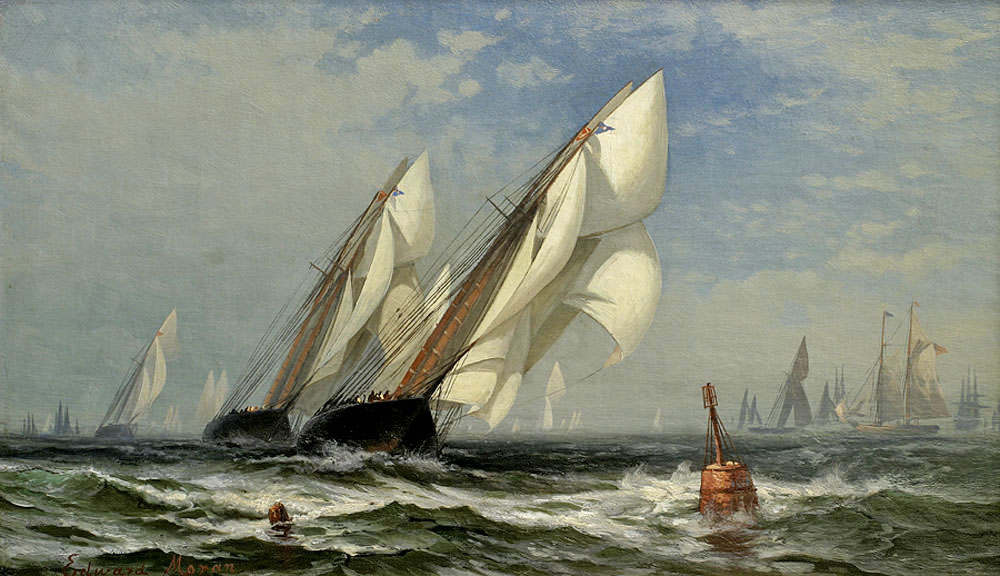
The Winning Yacht 1876, by Edward Moran, depicts the Idler winning of the Brenton’s Reef Challenge Cup on July 27, 1876, by beating the schooner Wanderer.

In December 1872, Durant sold the Idler to Samuel J. Colgate, millionaire toothpaste and soap manufacturer. He had her rebuilt in March 1873 at the Henry Steers shipyard in Greenpoint, Brooklyn. She was lengthened by 8 feet (2.4 m) and her topmasts were heightened to carry more sail.

Colgate raced the Idler many times. In June 1873, she came in second at the NYYC regatta, beaten by the Madeline but winning on time allowance. In August 1874, the Idler won the colors in her class during the New York Yacht Club annual cruise. The course was from Brenton's Reef lightship and to Oak Bluffs. She competed against the Alarm, Dauntless, and Josephine. She placed last out of seven first-class schooners in the NYCC annual regatta of June 1875, but second in the oceanic schooner regatta held by the Columbia Yacht Club a week later and first in the schooner race held in July by the Seawanhaka Yacht Club of Oyster Bay, New York.

In the 1876 NYYC summer regatta, she set the record for the fastest time over the club course, at 4 hours, 54 minutes, 48 1/2 seconds. She again won the Cape May Challenge Cup race of 1876, beating the America, Countess of Dufferin, Tidal Wave, and Wanderer. She also won the Brenton's Reef Challenge Cup in July 1876, beating the Wanderer and Tidal Wave (America and Countess of Dufferin were disqualified for not following the course). She then won the Seawanhaka Yacht Club prize on September 16, 1876, and the NYYC fall regatta.

Colgate had Idler's keel reworked in early 1877 by the Steers shipyard, removing her centreboard. Colgate took the yacht on a cruise of the West Indies in April and May 1877. She returned to New York in time to participate in the Seawanhaka Yacht Club regatta in June, where she came in second, beaten by the Rambler. Idler won the Cape May Challenge Cup in September, easily outracing the Rambler, Vesta, and Dreadnaught.

Colgate did not race the yacht in 1878, laying her up in New York Harbor.

=== Fisher ownership years: End of her racing career ===
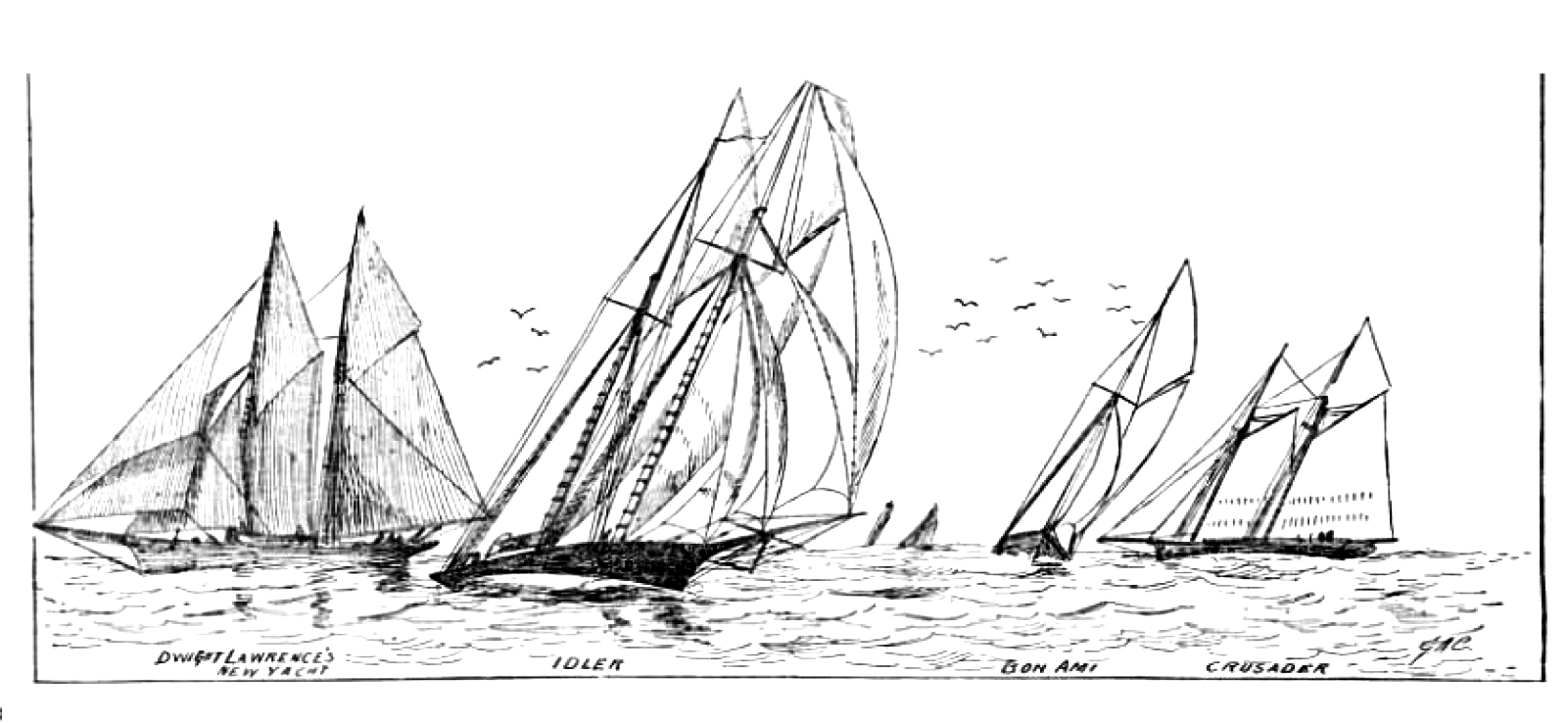
1895 drawing of the Idler and three other yachts belonging to the Columbia Yacht Club.

Archibald J. Fisher, millionaire grain merchant of Illinois, purchased the Idler in April 1879 from Samuel J. Colgate for $24,000 ($809,914 in 2024 dollars). With no other first-class schooner in Chicago in 1880, she "won" every race she entered. She won the Chicago Yacht Club Cup in 1882 and 1883.

Idler received a new foremast in April 1882, a general overhaul in June 1882, a new maintopmast in August 1882, and another general overhaul, including deck recaulking, in March 1883. Her interior was completely refurbished in June 1883, and she underwent yet another general overhaul in April 1885. The Inter Ocean newspaper estimated the total cost of the work was $38,000 ($1,282,364 in 2024 dollars).

The Idler was used primarily as a pleasure craft in 1886, and saw decreasing use through 1887. In 1888, she wasn't placed in the water until late July. By then, the ship was suffering from dry rot. She was drydocked, her hull replanked, and her deck recaulked.

=== Cudahy years as a pleasure yacht ===
Fisher sold the Idler to John Cudahy, millionaire owner of the Cudahy Packing Company, in September 1889 for $10,000 ($349,963 in 2024 dollars). Even though the press estimated the cost of further repairs to the ship would be relatively low (just $2,000 [$1,329,859 in 2024 dollars]), Cudahy had the yacht completely rebuilt, removing all but her white pine deck. The cabin was rebuilt with satinwood and rosewood. All new boards were sawn to the same pattern as those they replaced. The cost of the reconstruction was $18,000 ($629,933 in 2024 dollars).

Her home port was Cudahy's summer home on Mackinac Island in Lake Huron, where the wealthy meatpacker used it primarily for pleasure cruises.

Cudahy did not put the Idler in commission in 1893. It sat in drydock all year. Rot attacked the hull again, and in August 1893 it sprung a major leak which went unnoticed for days. A group of Chicagoans chartered the Idler in the summer of 1894, and she was put back in the water in July. She returned to the slip in late August. Cudahy later claimed that he completely overhauled the Idler in 1894, which included replacing all her masts.

W.D. Boyce, who led the recently formed Columbia Yacht Club in Chicago, chartered the Idler in April 1895 for use as his yacht club flagship. Boyce overhauled the hull, replaced the deck, and bought new canvas and rigging. He raced her competitively for the first time in the Milwaukee Yacht Club Regatta on July 4, 1896. She lost to the steel-hulled schooner Priscilla of Cleveland.

Idler was not raced in 1896, and served irregularly as a charter craft. On July 12, 1897, she almost sank twice in Lake Michigan. A family had rented the yacht for a pleasure cruise, and encountered a severe storm off Evanston, Illinois. Her mainmast snapped at the socket, her jibboom splinted, and her upper spars snapped. She lost several sails to the wind, and her rigging became hopelessly tangled. Unable to furl sails or steer, Idler nearly sank. After the storm eased, the crew was cut away all the rigging. She drifted all night, and by daybreak was off Chicago. The storm had driven lakewater against the shore, and the heavy backwash almost swamped her. A life-saving tugboat was able to reach her and get the Idler inside the harbor breakwater.

The yacht was repaired, but Boyce surrendered his lease. Cudahy allowed the Columbia Yacht Club to use the Idler as a "club ship" in 1898 even as he quietly put the yacht up for sale.

By the spring of 1899, the Idler's hull was covered in weeds and seagrass, and she had developed several leaks. That May, Cudahy leased the vessel to the Illinois Militia for use as a training ship. The terms of the lease stated that Illinois must pay all the expenses of keeping her in good order. She was drydocked, her hull scraped and caulked, and she received new masts and new sails. The cost of the repairs were $600 ($22,678 in 2024 dollars). The militia installed two one-pound cannon on her. This violated the Treaty of 1818 between the United States and United Kingdom, which prohibited armed military vessels on the Great Lakes. This led to a formal letter of protest from Britain, and the exchange of several follow-up diplomatic notes. The issue became moot when the Idler returned to her American port.

The month-long training cruise revealed that the Idler was in a state of dangerous disrepair. On September 4, 1899, the yacht was caught in a storm off Chicago. Her foremain boom split, her foremast loosened, and she lost her pin rail and a number of sails. Officers feared she might sink, and made a run for the harbor. An inspection revealed rotten wood throughout the ship. The seams in her hull above the waterline were open, her steel ribbing was rusted through, and many of her stays were rotten. She was in such bad shape that any storm was a danger to her, and the training officers said they were lucky she didn't sink.

It was clear that the Idler needed a complete overhaul in drydock, and the Illinois Militia returned the vessel to Cudahy's possession.

== The "Idler disaster" ==
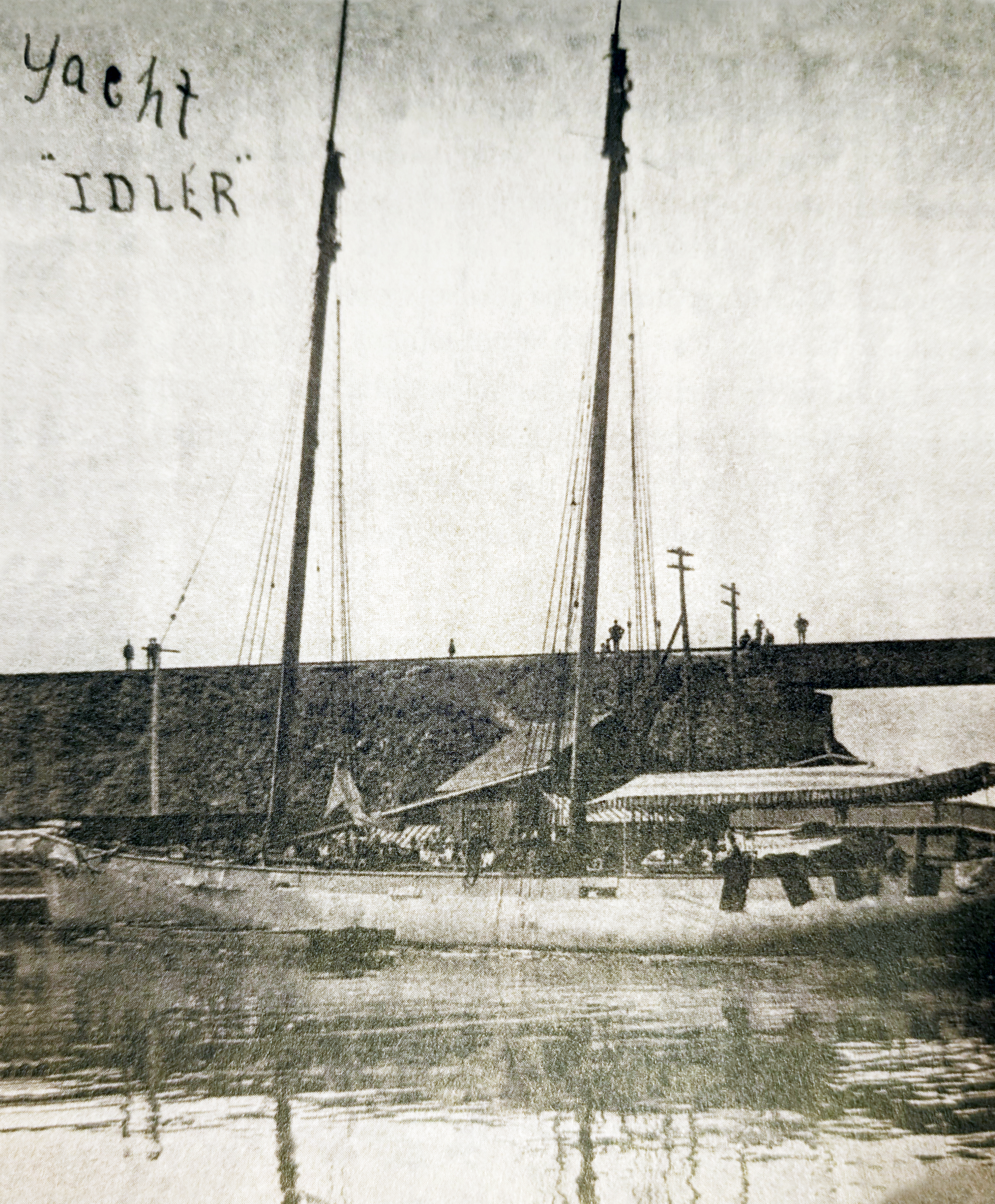
The Idler during an overhaul in Fairport, Ohio, in 1900

On October 5, 1899, James Corrigan purchased the Idler for about $12,000 ($453,552 in 2024 dollars). He moved her to Fairport Harbor, Ohio, on Lake Erie, and refurbished her at a cost of $8,000 ($302,368 in 2024 dollars). He had all but her hull replaced and the ship painted white. Her new interior accommodations were extremely comfortable.

On July 7, 1900, the Idler capsized in a squall on Lake Erie off Cleveland killing six members of the family of John A. and James C. Corrigan, the owners of the vessel. The only survivors were Captain Charles Joseph Holmes, master of the schooner, Mrs. John Corrigan and six crewmen.

After the disaster, Corrigan turned title to the boat over to his friend, Albert R. Rumsey.

The yacht was partially raised on July 13, and towed into the harbor at Cleveland on July 14. She was pumped out and refloated on July 15.

== End of service ==
Rumsey had the Idler towed to Fairport on October 17. It was tied up there for a year. Rumsey initially planned to have the yacht rebuilt as a steam-powered vessel, but abandoned this idea in October 1901 and had it stripped of all usable material.

On January 22, 1904, an ice jam on the Grand River swept the Idler and several other vessels out onto Lake Erie. The yacht was towed back to her berth, but on March 24 another ice jam broke the Idler free and took her out onto the lake. This time, the lake ice pierced the yacht's hull, and she sank. Rumsey sold the wreck, and the new owner intended to salvage the 6 short tons (5.4 t) of pig iron ballast in the yacht. He failed to take any action, and the United States Army Corps of Engineers dismantled and removed the wreck.

== Bibliography ==
- Bellamy, John Stark (2010). The Last Days of Cleveland: And More True Tales of Crime and Disaster From Cleveland's Past. Cleveland: Gray & Company. ISBN 9781598510676.
- Olsen, Niels (1874). The American Yacht List, Containing a Complete Register of the Yacht Clubs of the United States and British Provinces. New York: L.H. Biglow & Co. hdl:2027/hvd.hn6uib. OCLC 1102670133.
