= Fleetwing (ship, 1865) =

Schooner Yacht

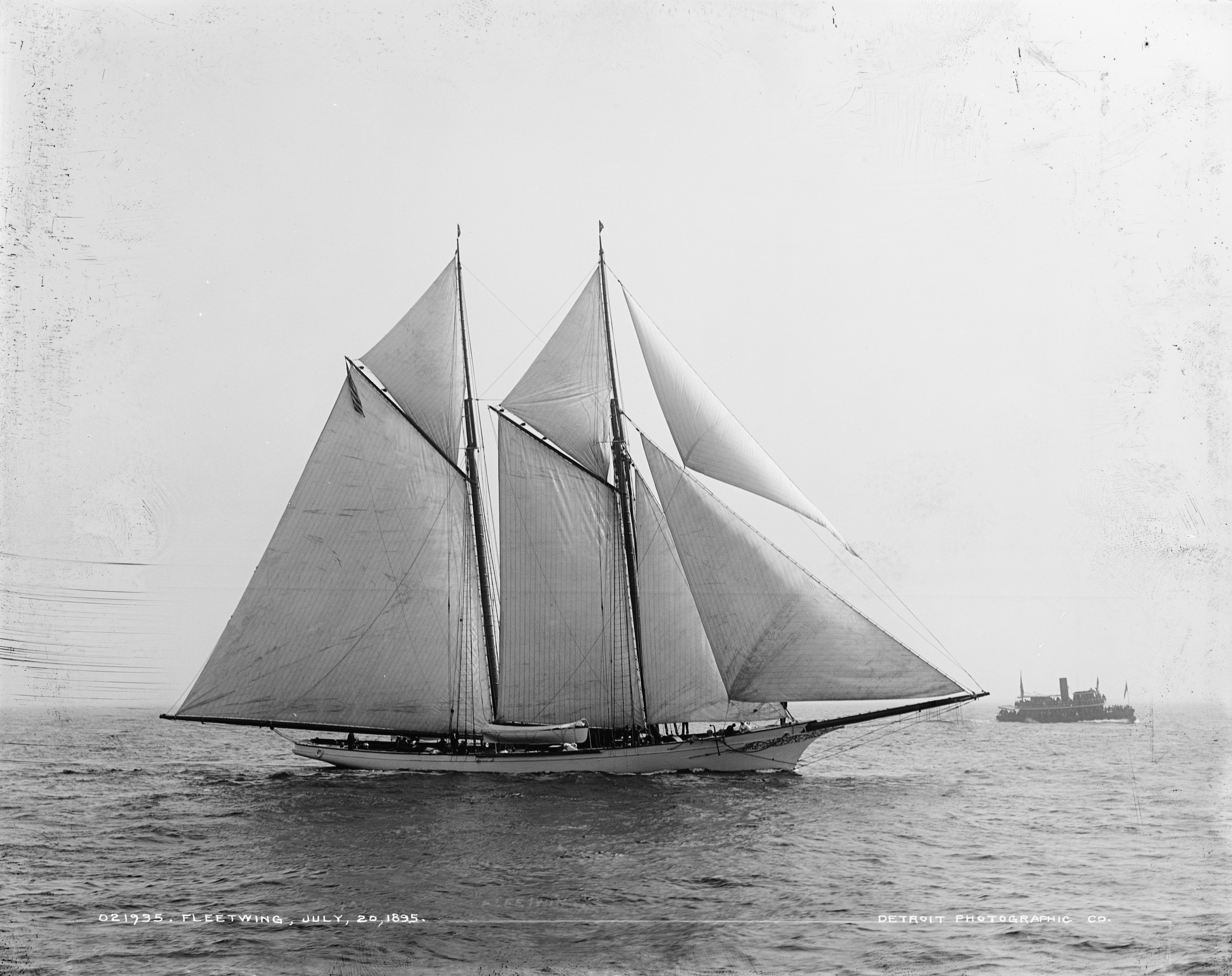
- Schooner Yacht Fleetwing

History

United States
- Name: Fleetwing
- Owner: George A. Osgood
- Operator: Captain Thomas
- Builder: Joseph D. Van Deusen
- Launched: 1865
- Out of service: 1905
- Home port: New York City
- Honors and awards: America’s Cup defense in 1870
- Fate: Sold

General characteristics
- Class & type: Schooner
- Type: keel yacht
- Tonnage: 112 tonnage burden
- Length: 106 ft 0 in (32.31 m) on deck
- Beam: 24 ft 0 in (7.32 m)
- Depth: 10 ft 0 in (3.05 m)
- Propulsion: schooner sail
- Sail plan: 2,208 sq ft (205.1 m^{2}) sail area
- Crew: twenty-two

The Fleetwing was a 19th-century wooden yacht schooner, built in 1865 by Joseph D. Van Deusen and owned by yachtsman George Archer Osgood. She was one of the fastest yachts in the squadron. The Fleetwing was in the famous 1886 transatlantic ocean race for the New York Yacht Club. She came in 12th in an unsuccessful America’s Cup defense in 1870.

== Construction and service ==
The Fleetwing was built in 1865 by Joseph D. Van Deusen and owned by yachtsman George Archer Osgood brother of Franklin Osgood. George was a son-in-law of Commodore Cornelius Vanderbilt. She was 112 tons burden, keel boat, and 106 length on deck; 24-foot beam and 10-feet depth of hold.

In September 1865, the Fleetwing was in a race with James G. Bennett's yacht Henrietta. The course was from Sandy Hook around Cape May Lightship and back. The Fleetwing won by 1 hour and 19 minutes. In October 1865, Fleetwing was defeated by the Vesta over the same course.

In May 1866, Fleetwing underwent a complete overhaul to get ready for an ocean yacht race for a purse of $90,000. She got a new set of sails to prepare for the upcoming ocean regatta. She was one of the fastest yachts in the squadron.

=== The great ocean yacht race ===
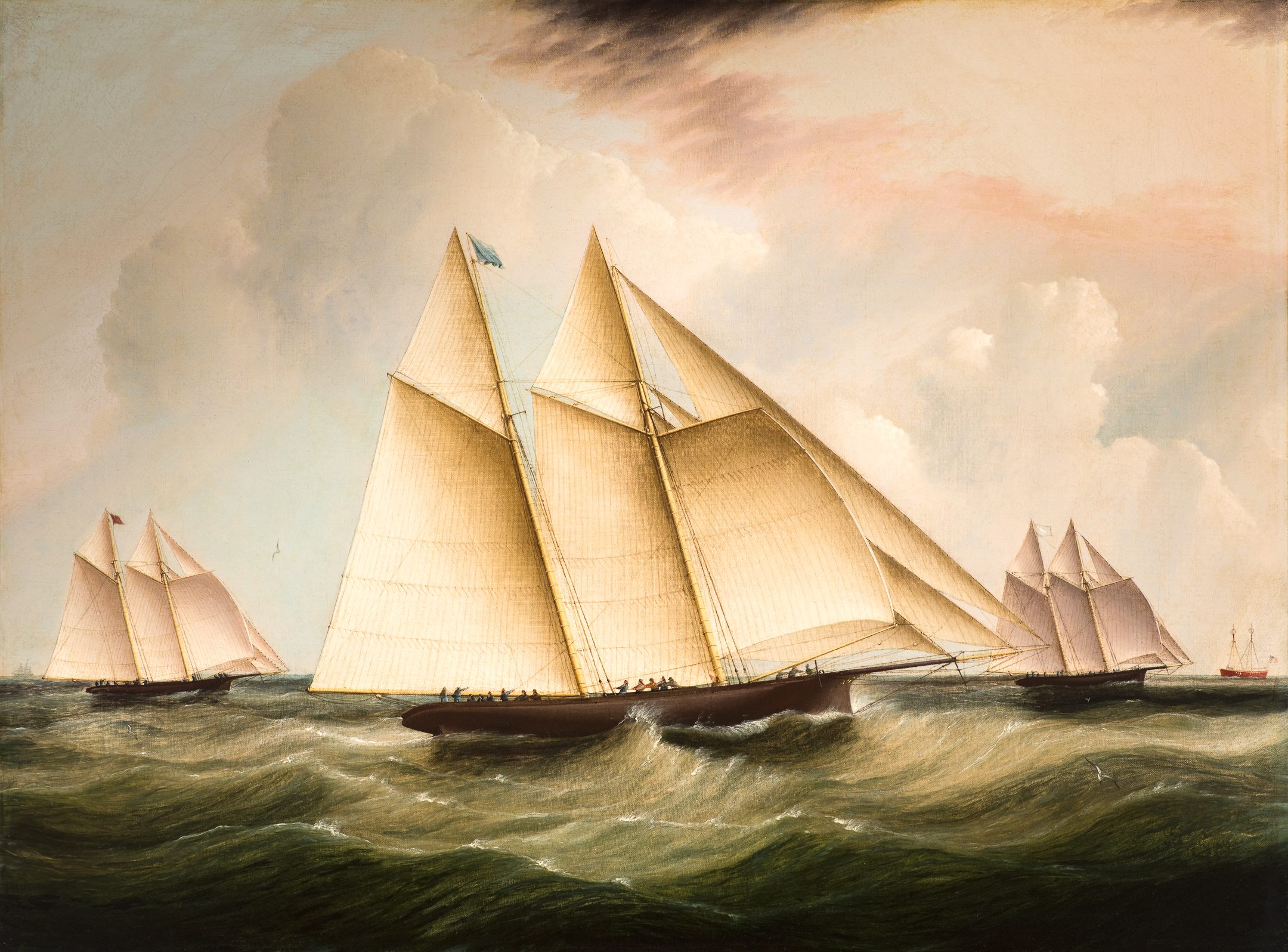
The Start of the Great 1866 Transatlantic Yacht Race by James E. Buttersworth. Showing Fleetwing, Henrietta, and Vesta.

On Tuesday, December 11, 1866, in what was billed as the "Great Ocean Yacht Race", three wealthy American men, all members of the New York Yacht Club, took their yachts on a mid-winter transatlantic race across the Atlantic. The three yachts were the Vesta owned by Pierre Lorillard Jr., the Fleetwing owned by George Osgood and the Henrietta owned and sailed by the 21-year-old yachtsman James Gordon Bennett Jr. Each yachtsman put up $30,000 in the winner-take-all wager. They started from the Sandy Hook Light, during high westerly winds and raced to The Needles, the furthest westerly point of the Isle of Wight in the English Channel, before reaching the seaport Cowes on the Isle of Wight. On December 26, Bennett's Henrietta won with a time of 13 days, 21 hours, 55 minutes, with Captain Samuel S. Samuels as the skipper. The Fleetwing came in second and Vesta came in third, both boats took over 14 days to reach Cowes. The Fleetwing, with Captain Thomas in command, had eight of her twenty-two crew washed overboard in a westerly gale on December 20. Six of them drowned.

=== 1870 America's cup ===
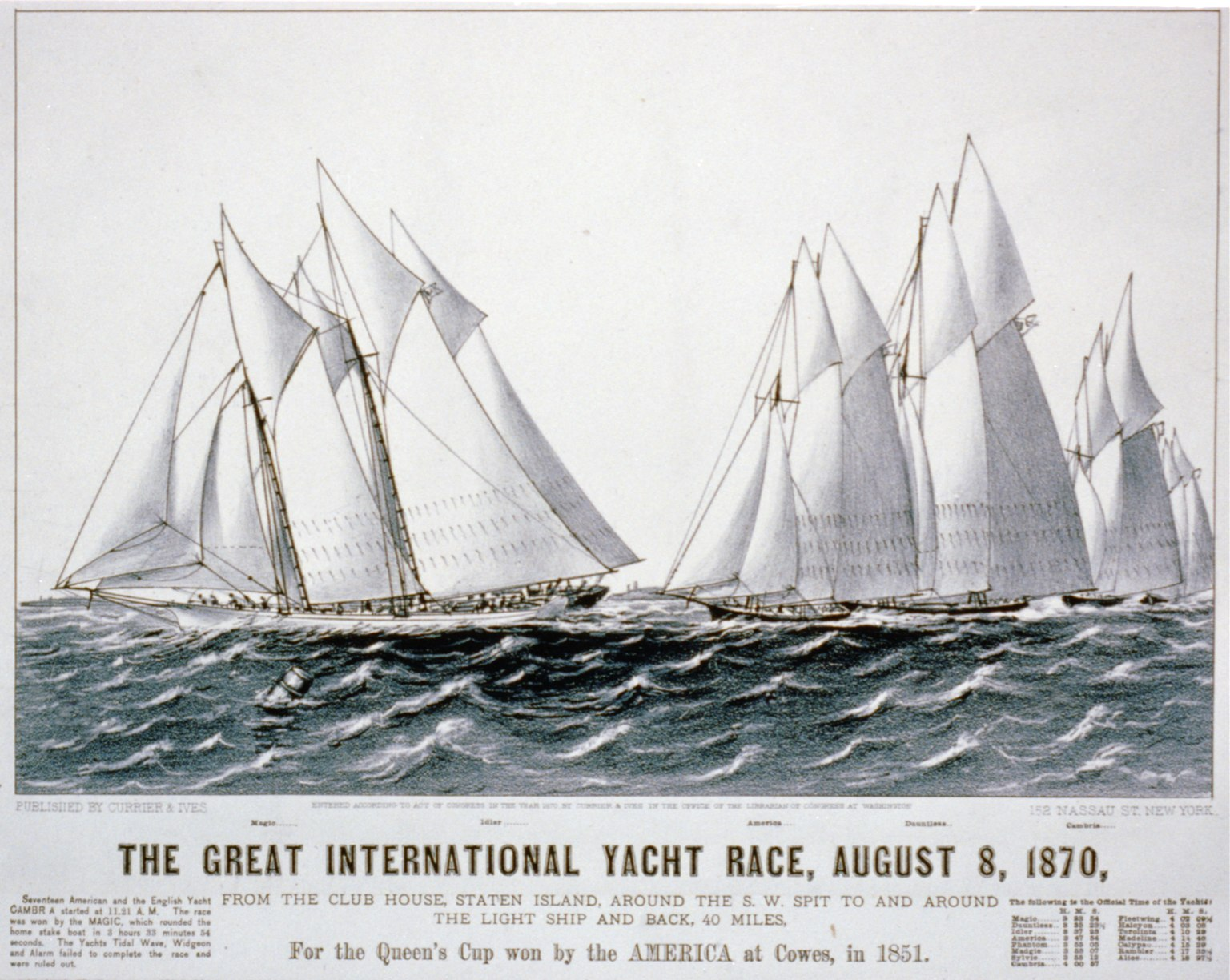
The 1870 America's Cup yacht race, August 8, 1870.

On August 8, 1870, the international 1870 America's Cup (also called the Queen's Cup) was the first America's Cup to be hosted in the United States at New York Harbor. George A. Osgood with his American schooner Fleetwing and his brother Franklin Osgood's with his yacht Magic, were in the competition. The course started from the Staten Island N.Y.Y.C anchorage down through the Narrows to the S.W. Split buoy, across to the Sandy Hook lightship and return to Staten Island. The race was won by the Franklin Osgood's Magic with the Fleetwing finishing in 12th place. Franklin Osgood's yacht Magic beat 16 competitors from the New York Yacht Club, including James Lloyd Ashbury's English yacht Cambria that sailed to New York on behalf of the Royal Thames Yacht Club and the yachts Dauntless, Idler, Fleetwing, Phantom, America and others.

In 1884, The schooner yacht Fleetwing was owned by Robert Elliot, who rebuilt and lengthened her at Port Jefferson, New York. She was lengthened to 117 feet long.

In 1903, the Fleetwing was owned by E. O. Mapes, of Minneapolis who sailed her to the West Indies. They left the yacht at Cienfuegos, Cuba.

== End of service ==
In 1905, the Fleetwing adventures ended when she was laid up in Erie Basin in Brooklyn. She was then bought by the American Baptist Home Mission Society and fitted as a gospel ship for religious work among the sailors.
