= Franklin Osgood =

American businessman and yachtsman

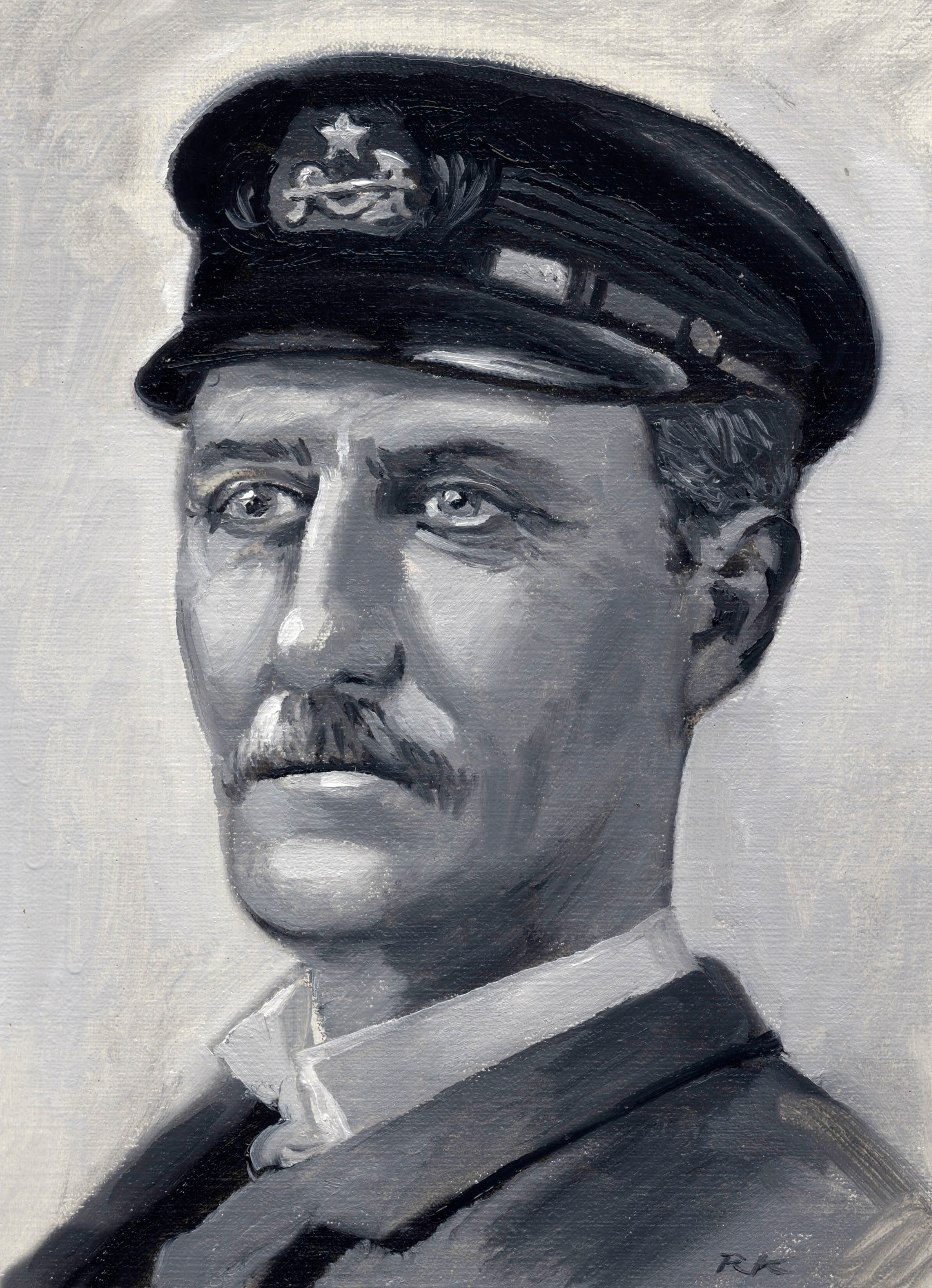
- An illustration of Osgood from his U.S. passport description
- Born: December 24, 1828; Baltimore, Maryland, U.S.
- Died: January 13, 1888 (aged 59); Manhattan, New York, U.S.
- Occupations: businessman, yachtsman

Franklin Osgood (December 24, 1828 – January 13, 1888) was an American businessman and yachtsman. Having sailed for more than 23 years, he was owner and manager of the racing yachts Widgeon, Columbia, and Magic. He was the first defender and two-time winner of the America's Cup (1870 and 1871). Osgood was inducted into the America's Cup Hall of Fame in 2020.

== Early life and education ==
Osgood was born in Baltimore, Maryland in 1828. He was the son of Robert Hawkins Osgood (1790–1855) and Sally Archer (1792–1872). His father came from Salem, Massachusetts. He married Isabella Borrowe on February 8, 1854, at the St. George's Church in Manhattan.

Franklin had an older brother, George Archer Osgood (1820–1882) who was a yachtsman, which he later went into business with. He married Eliza Matilda Vanderbilt a daughter of Commodore Cornelius Vanderbilt. A younger brother, William Henry Osgood (1837–1896), was a yachtsman.

== Professional life ==
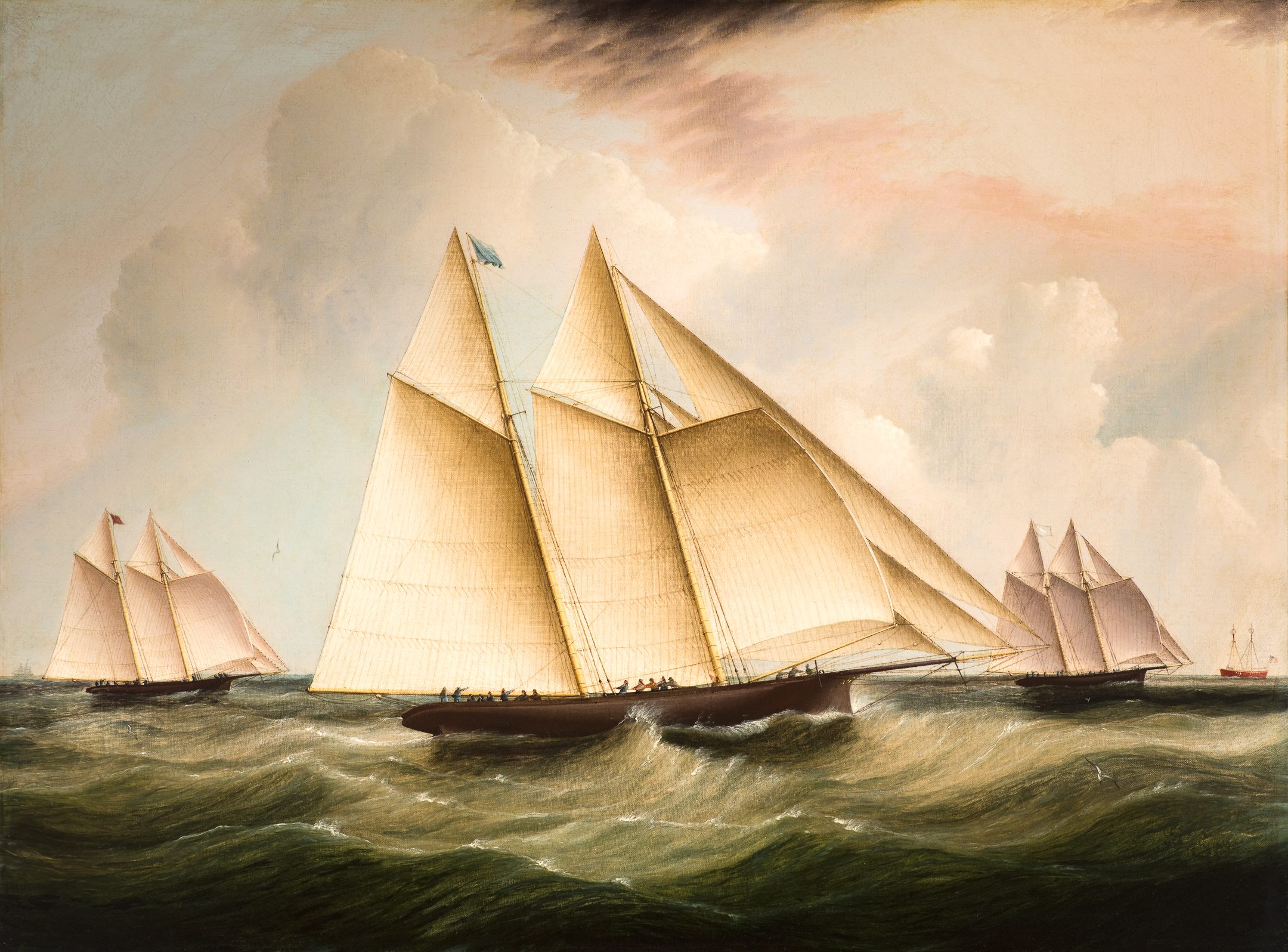
The 1866 Transatlantic Yacht Race with Fleetwing, Henrietta, and Vesta

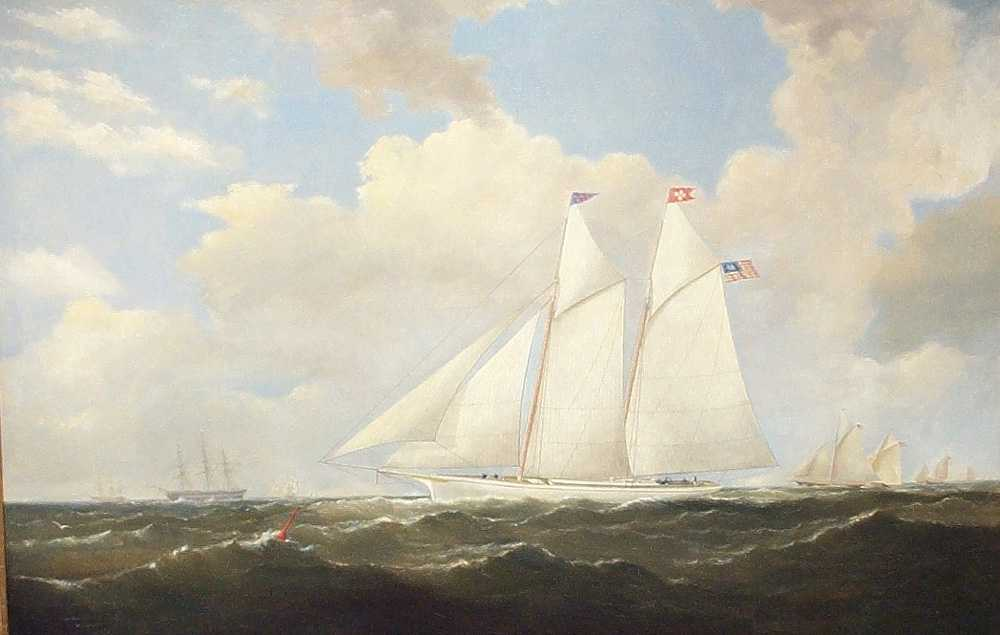
Racing yacht Magic, defender in 1870 America's Cup

In 1856, Osgood became a director of the Silver Hill Mining Company in North Carolina. After the American Civil War Osgood purchased controlling interest the mining company of North Carolina, which yielded rich returns. With the acquisition of wealth, he became a yachtsman. In 1865, he purchased the yacht Widgeon, built by James R. & George Steers, that won several races. One of them was a $1,000 race with the yacht Vesta. On April 28, 1867, Lloyd Phoenix, Rear Commodore of the New York Yacht Club, purchased the yacht Widgeon from Franklin Osgood.

On December 11, 1866, there was a transatlantic race between three American yachts, the Vesta owned by Pierre Lorillard IV, the Fleetwing owned by George Osgood and the Henrietta owned by yachtsman James Gordon Bennett Jr. Each yachtsman put up $30,000 in the winner-take-all wager. They started off at Sandy Hook, New Jersey, during high westerly winds and raced to The Needles, the furthest westerly point on the Isle of Wight in the English Channel. Bennett's Henrietta won with a time of 13 days, 21 hours, 55 minutes.

In 1869, Osgood bought the racing yacht Magic. His first victory with the Magic was over the Rambler in the fall of 1869.

== America's Cup challenges ==
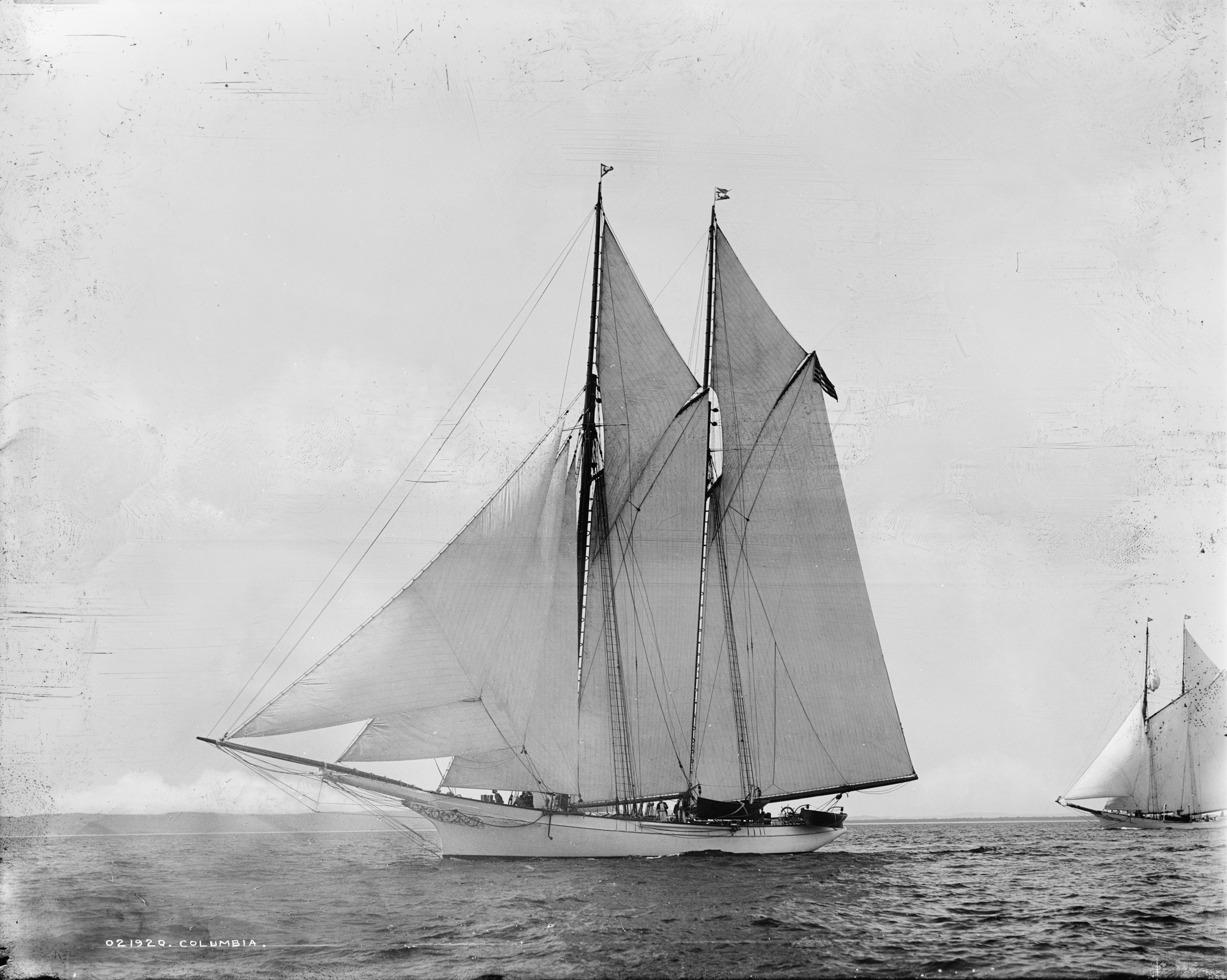
Columbia, the yacht in which Osgood finished in second place in the America's Cup race in 1871

On August 8, 1870, Osgood's schooner Magic became the first yacht to successfully defend the America's Cup for the New York Yacht Club in the inaugural defense of the trophy. Magic defeated sixteen other defenders and the first challenger Cambria, representing the Royal Thames Yacht Club of London. Other yachts in the race included the Dauntless, Idler, Fleetwing, Phantom, America and others.

Osgood sold the Magic to New York actor Lester Wallack, for $16,500 on October 11, 1870. Osgood bought her back but sold her to Rufus Hatch in 1873. In 1874, she was purchased by William T. Garner, who kept her until 1876, when Osgood bought her back for a third time and kept until 1879.

Osgood built the schooner-yacht Columbia, at the J.B Van Deusen shipyard in 1871. He sailed the Columbia in the second America's Cup race in 1871 against British challenger yacht Livonia. Skippered by Andrew J. Comstock, Columbia won the first two races against Livonia. She was beaten by Livonia in the third race and was so damaged in the race, that she was unable to compete in the final races. She was the first America's Cup defender to concede a win to the challenger. The yacht Sappho was substituted and won the America's Cup for the second time for the U.S.

In 1872, he won the Bennett Cup at Newport, Rhode Island in the Columbia. He continued as master of the Columbia after the yacht was sold to Lester Wallack in 1872.

Osgood remained with the New York Yacht Club where he completed three terms of service as Rear-Commodore. He was a member of the first America's Cup Committee of the N.Y.Y.C, which was formed in 1869 and consisted of George L. Schuyler, Moses H. Grinnell, and Osgood.

In 1881, Osgood purchased the Lehigh Zinc Company's mines and formed the Friedensville Zinc Company. He built a zinc oxide plant and zinc smelter in Friedensville, Pennsylvania. Zinc mining was a key industry in the area with the Friedensville Zinc Mines dating back to 1845.

== Death ==
Osgood died on January 13, 1888, age 62, at the New York Hotel in Manhattan. Funeral services were held at the historic Grace Church. Interment was at the Green-wood Cemetery in Brooklyn.

== Honors ==
For his services to the America's Cup, he was inducted into the America's Cup Hall of Fame in 2020.
