= Dauntless (ship, 1866) =

Schooner Yacht

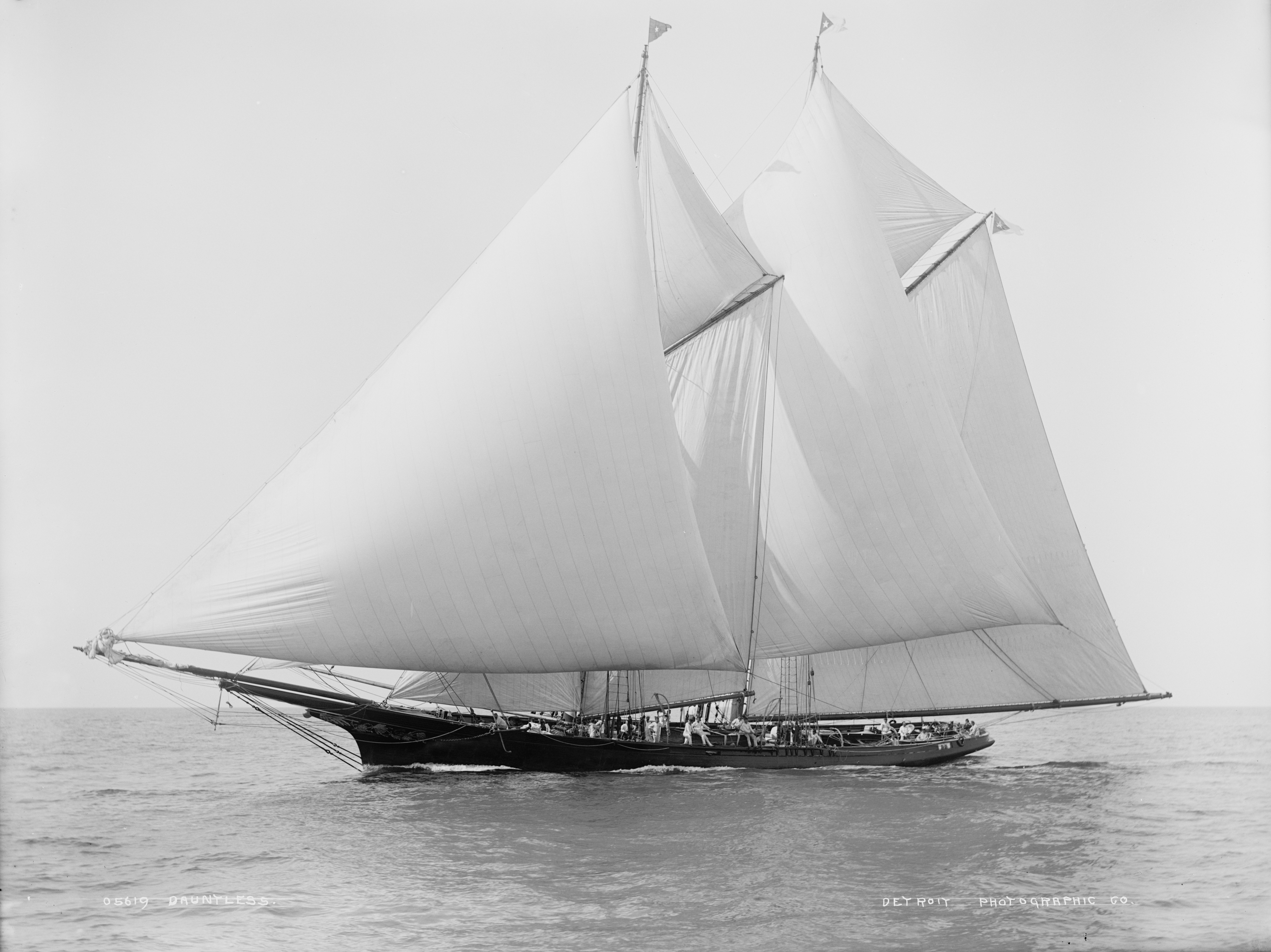
- Schooner Yacht Dauntless

History

United States
- Name: Dauntless
- Owner: S. Dexter Bradford; James Gordon Bennett Jr.
- Operator: James Gordon Bennett Jr.; Samuel S. Samuels
- Builder: Forsyth & Morgan
- Cost: $80,000
- Launched: June 1866
- Christened: Spring 1867
- Renamed: From L'Hirondelle to Dauntless
- Fate: Broken up

General characteristics
- Class & type: Schooner
- Type: keel yacht
- Displacement: 255 tonnage burden
- Length: 114 ft 0 in (34.75 m) on deck
- Beam: 25 ft 8 in (7.82 m)
- Depth: 10 ft 2 in (3.10 m)
- Propulsion: schooner sail
- Sail plan: 83.7 ft 7 in (25.69 m) foremast; 63.7 ft 0 in (19.42 m) mainboom; 6,000 sq ft (560 m^{2}) sail area

Dauntless was a 19th-century wooden yacht schooner, designed and built in 1866 by Forsyth & Morgan at Mystic Bridge, Connecticut, and owned and sailed by noted yachtsmen, among them James Gordon Bennett Jr. and Caldwell Hart Colt. She was first called the L'Hirondelle and later renamed the Dauntless. The Dauntless was in three Trans-Atlantic matches for the New York Yacht Club. She came in fourth in an unsuccessful America’s Cup defense in 1870.

== Construction and service ==
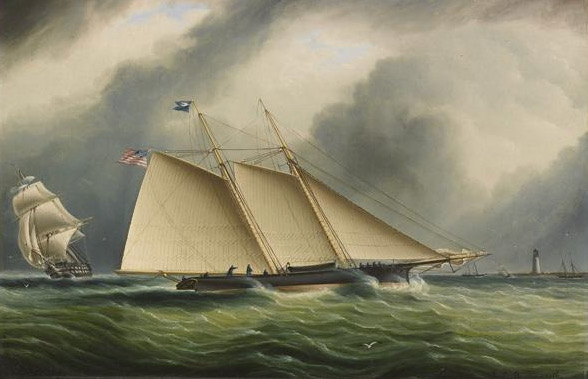
Painting of the yacht Yacht L'Hirondelle by James E. Buttersworth.

The 97-foot keel sloop schooner L'Hirondelle was designed by J.B Van Deusen and built in May 1866 by the Forsyth & Morgan shipyard in Mystic Bridge, Connecticut for S. Dexter Bradford Jr., of Newport, Rhode Island. Her dimensions were 114 feet length overall; 25.8 in beam, 10.2 in depth, and 255 tons burden. Her foremast was 83.7 feet; mainboom 63 feet. She had 4 galvanized iron water tanks.

On October 31, 1866, the L'Hirondelle was in her first race with the yacht Vesta, owned by Pierre Lorillard. The course was from Sandy Hook Lightship and they sailed 20 miles windward and back. The L'Hirondelle won the race.

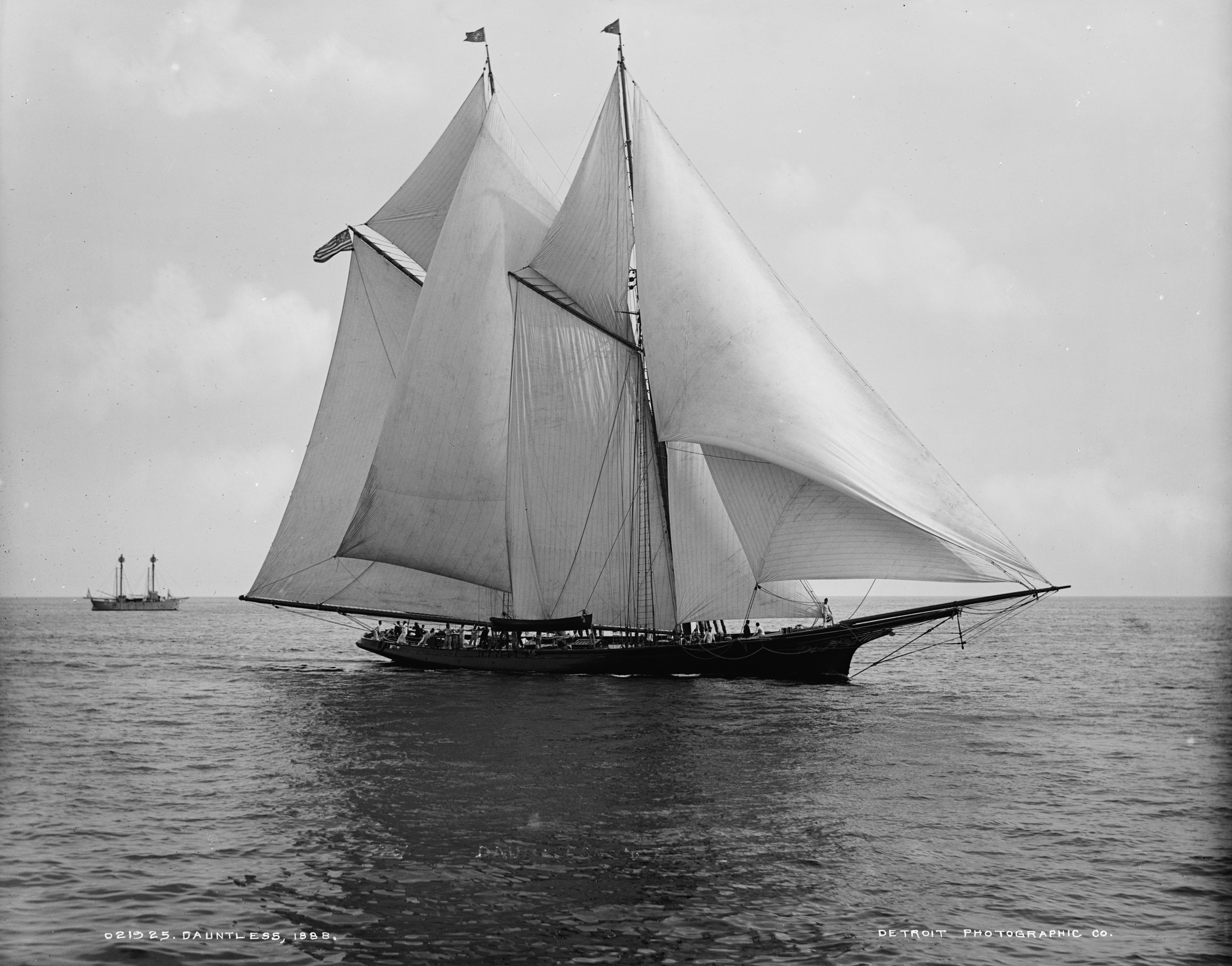
Photograph of the schooner Dauntless by John S. Johnston.

In April 1867, James Gordon Bennett Jr., vice-president of the New York Yacht Club, purchased the yacht L'Hirondelle for $75,000 from Bradford. In May 1867, Bennett refitted the L'Hirondelle and change her name to the Dauntless. She was rebuilt and rigged as a schooner. Bennett added 23 feet to her length. Her new dimensions changed to 121 feet; 25-foot beam and 299-tons.

In June 1867, Bennett entered the Dauntless in the annual June New York Yacht Club regatta. She raced against the Magic, Phantom, Widgeon, Vesta, and other schooners and sloops. The course was from Owl's Head to the Sandy Hook Light and back. The schooner Phantom came in 1st place at 5hr. 40min, and 57 secs; the Magic 2nd place at 5hr. 48min, and 24 secs and the Dauntless 4th place at 6hr. 7min, and 12 secs.

On June 28, 1869, the Dauntless left New York and sailed to Queenstown, Ireland on July 11. 1878 in 12 days 17 hours and 6 minutes.

== The America's Cup challenges ==
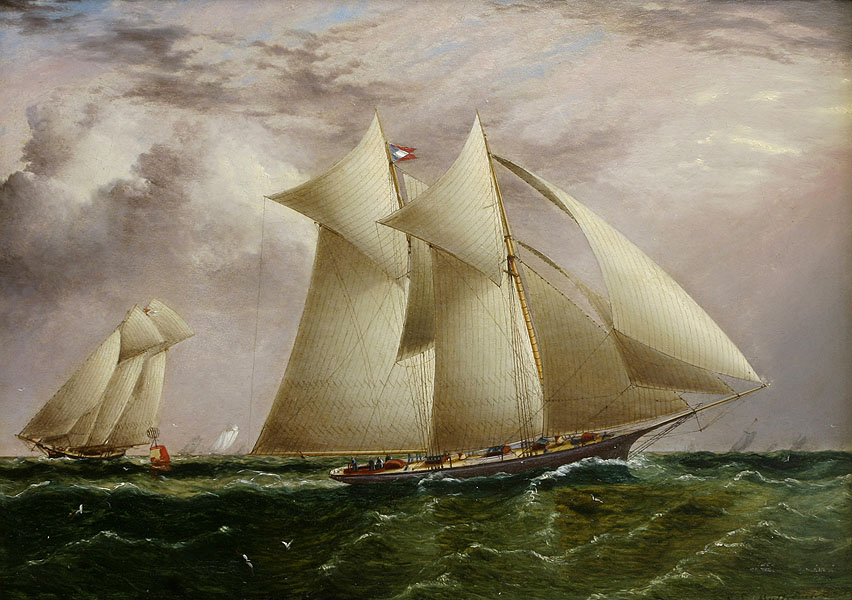
Sappho Leads Dauntless, 1870 by James E. Buttersworth.

On April 4, 1870, the Bennett's yacht, Dauntless sailed across the Atlantic Ocean to England with Bennett for an international ocean yacht race. In May 1870, Sappho won the race against James Lloyd Ashbury's English yacht Cambria. The Dauntless came in third place. On July 4, 1870, the Bennett's yacht, Dauntless raced across the Atlantic Ocean from Ireland to New York in challenge the English yacht Cambria. Cambria won the race by arriving first off Sandy Hook lightship in 23 days 5 hours and 17 minutes; 1 hour 43 minutes ahead of Dauntless.

Bennett made an unsuccessful challenge for the first race for the 1870 America's Cup, held since 1851 by the New York Yacht Club. Bennett's first challenge was on August 8, 1870, with his yacht Dauntless, with "Bully" Samuels at the helm. The Dauntless faced 14 yachts of the New York Yacht Club. The course was from Daunt's Rock, off Queenstown, to the America's Sandy Hook lightship. The race was won by the Franklin Osgood's Magic with the Dauntless finishing in fifth place.

The Dauntless was in the July 1871 New York Yacht Club's Cape May Regatta. She came in second place over the Sappho. Other boats in the race included the yachts: Franklin Osgood's Columbia, Gracie, and Dauntless.

In October 1871, there was a second America's Cup. The rules for the race stated that the "first yacht to win four races would be the victor." As result, the Franklin Osgood's Columbia, skippered by Andrew J. Comstock, won the first two races. Livonia won the third race. The yacht Sappho was chosen to replace the Columbia that was damaged from the second and third race. The Dauntless defeated the Livonia in the race for a Fifty Guinea Cup. The Sappho won the final race to win America's Cup for the New York Yacht Club.

== Dauntless sold ==
On May 15, 1879, the Dauntless was sold to John R. Waller, of the N.Y.Y.C, who owned the sloop Gracie. He had her for 3 years before Captain Caldwell H. Colt bought her in 1882.

Captain Samuel Samuels was on Caldwell H. Colt's yacht Dauntless in the March 5, 1887 transatlantic ocean yacht race with the R. T. Bush's yacht Coronet. Each yachtsmen put up $10,000 for the race. The course was from Owl's Head to Roche's Point, Cork Harbour, Ireland, with the New York Yacht Club was in charge of the race. The Royal Cork Yacht Club judged the race. The Coronet won the race.

On August 8, 1892, the Dauntless was in the Morgan Cup for schooners at the New York Yacht Club's annual race. The course was around Cape Cod from Martha's Vineyard. She won the keel-schooner prize.

== End of service ==
In 1902, the Dauntless was moved to Essex, Connecticut on the condition that the schooner would never sail again. She was leased to a New York sportsman to serve as a hunting lodge. It was then transformed into a houseboat and became a mainstay of the town's waterfront. In the winter of 1915, she sank at her moorings into the Connecticut River. It was raised and towed by Captain Thomas Scott to his boatyard, where it was broken up, put on a train, and shipped to Wisconsin for firewood. The Dauntless name became part of the towns legend and lore.

== Legacy ==
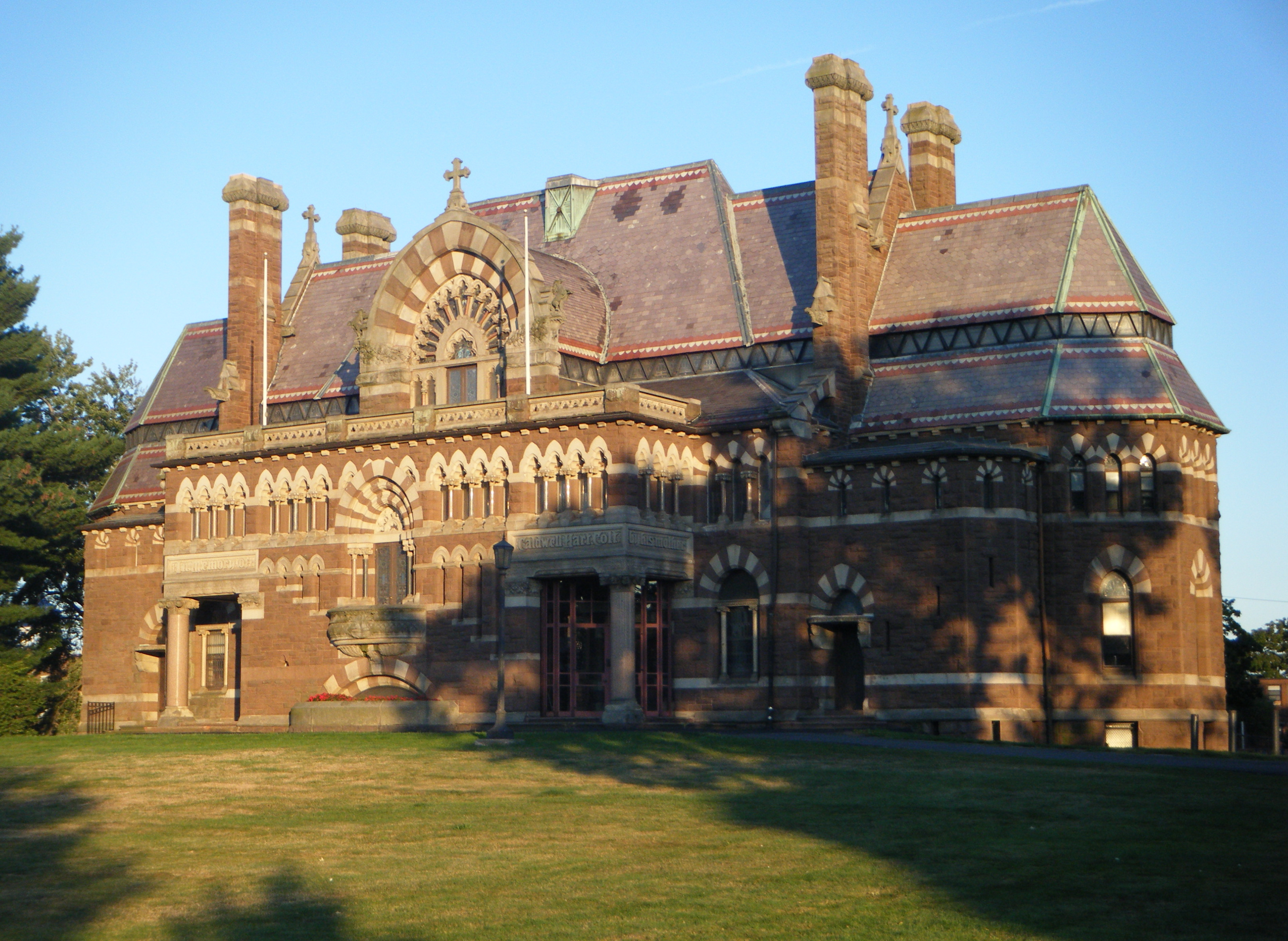
Good Shepherd Parish House, Hartford, Connecticut.

Dauntless will be remembered for her transatlantic trips and her America's Cup challenges. The Caldwell Hart Colt Memorial Hall was presented to the Church of the Good Shepherd by Mrs. Elizabeth Colt, as a memorial her son. One of the more prominent features on the second floor is an alcove memorial to Caldwell. This memorial features two brass cannons, which the vessel carried and the ship's bell. A large painting of Commodore Colt standing on the deck of the Dauntless near the wheel. In addition, the Dauntless Club at Essex is named after the famous vessel.
