= Samuel Samuels =

Designer and captain

Samuel S. Samuels
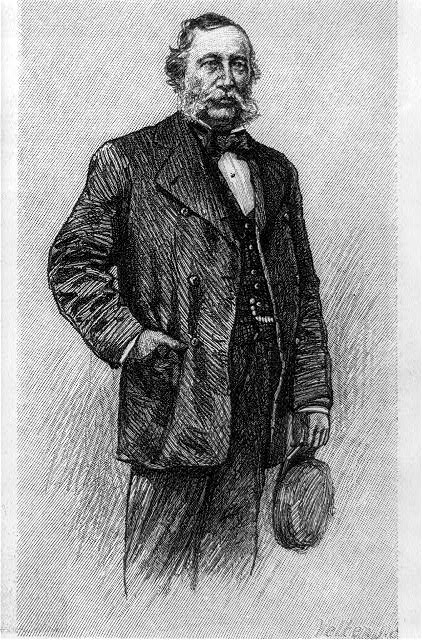
- Samuel Samuels, designer and captain of the Dreadnought. Print from a wood engraving.
- Born: March 8, 1823; Philadelphia, US
- Died: May 18, 1908 (aged 85); Brooklyn, New York, US
- Occupations: Designer, Sea captain

Captain Samuel S. Samuels (8 March 1823 – 18 May 1908) was a 19th-century American sea captain best known for command of the famous clipper ship the Dreadnought. The fastest sailing ship of the time was quite famous and Captain Samuels was also renowned as the captain and designer of the ship. In 1859 he set a new record for New York to Liverpool of only 9 days, 17 hours. Twice Captain Samuels sailed faster than steamer ships which were increasingly popular for freight during this time.

He was born in Philadelphia on 8 March 1823. According to his autobiography, works of James Fenimore Cooper and Frederick Marryat inspired him to run away to sea at the age of 11. As a youth Samuels is shanghaied onto a ship bound for Liverpool. He learns the skills of the seaman, becomes an officer, and then a captain by age twenty-one.

Samuels was captain of James Gordon Bennett Jr.'s yachts Henrietta and Dauntless in famous races in 1866 (Great Ocean Yacht Race), 1870 and 1887. After his 1866 win, Bennett bought the rival yacht, the Fleetwing, for $65,000.

In 1887 he released his autobiography From the Forecastle to the Cabin, published by Harper & Brothers. In the book he described all of the topics one would expect from the golden age of the sailing era: storms, shipwrecks, famine, disease, press-gangs, desertion, piracy, violence, mutiny. He also tells the story of meeting his future wife, Miss Harriet Alice Steele.

He died on 18 May 1908 at age 85 in Brooklyn, New York.
