= Andrew J. Comstock =

American pilot

Andrew Jackson Comstock
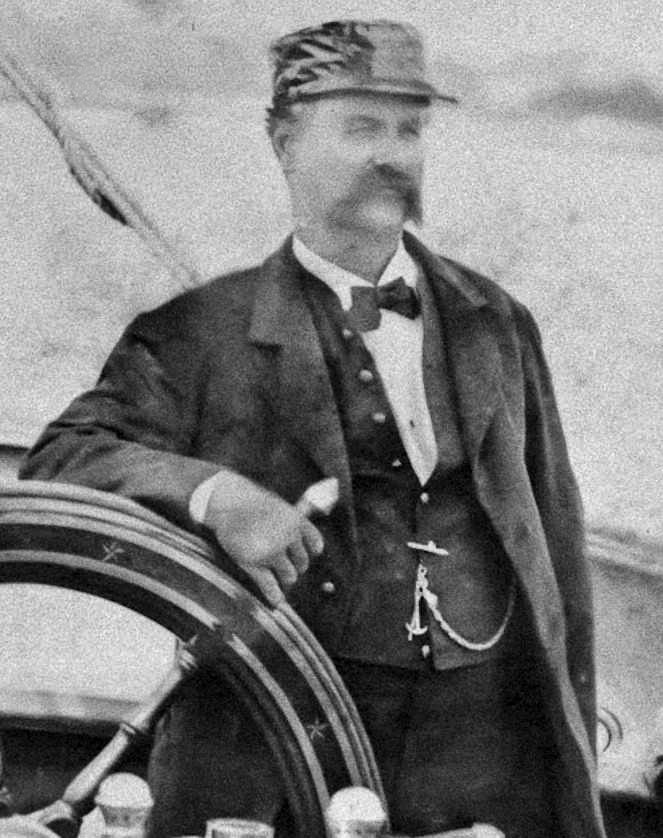
- Andrew J. Comstock, ca. 1880.
- Born: September 8, 1828; New London, Connecticut, US
- Died: July 1, 1910 (aged 81); New London, Connecticut, US
- Occupation: Maritime pilot
- Spouse: Mary Chapman Tinker
- Children: 2

Andrew Jackson Comstock (September 6, 1828 – July 1, 1910) was a 19th-century maritime pilot. He was an experienced yachtsman having sailed for more than 27 years. He was known for being the captain of the racing yachts Columbia and Magic that won races for the America's Cup.

== Early life ==
Andrew J. Comstock was born in New London, Connecticut on July 3, 1810. He was the son of sea captain Charles Comstock (1792-1843) and Catherine Harris (1793-1868). His family came to America in 1639 and settled in Connecticut. He was one of several Comstock brothers who were accomplished yachtsmen. His brother, Henry Nelson "Nels" Comstock was first mate on the racing yacht America, that was first winner of the America's Cup international sailing trophy in 1851. His older brother Peter Harris Comstock was commander of the yacht Cygnet. The Comstocks were well known to Richard Brown captain of the racing yacht America.

== Professional life ==
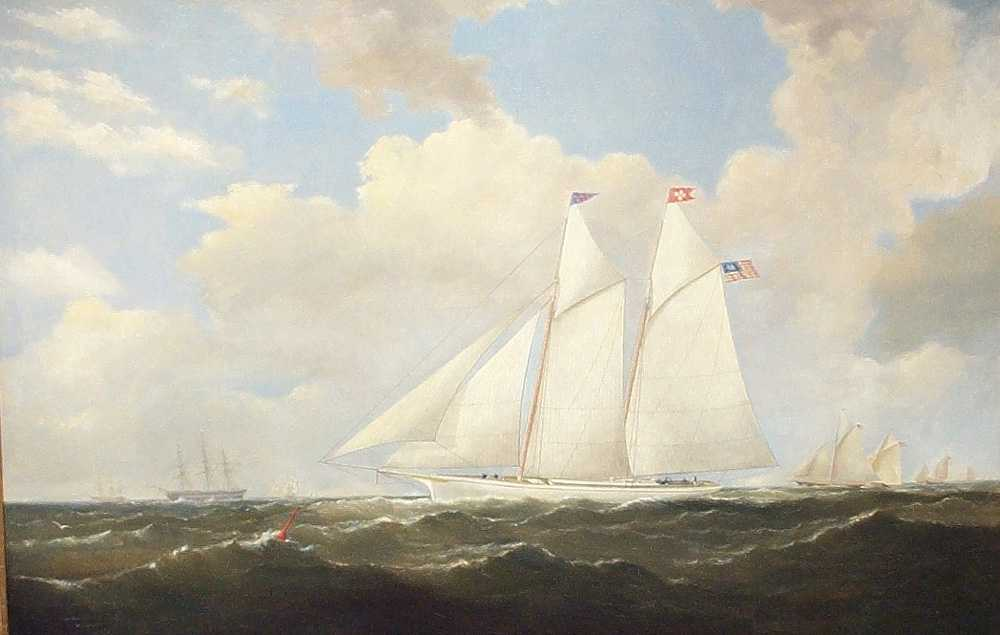
Racing yacht Magic defender in 1870 America's Cup.

Captain Comstock was and experienced sailing yachtsman having served for more than 27 years. His yachting career began in 1845 when he was a mate on the schooner-yacht Cygnet, which was commanded by his brother Peter. This yacht defeated several competitors in a race near Hoboken, New Jersey. He next commanded the yacht Sylvie with Captain Stebbins as the owner. In 1858, he sailed and won four races with the yacht Mallory owned by Captain Bache of New York. In the 1860s he was master of the yacht Calypso. He won a race on the Haze owned by John E. Devlin of New York.

He was commander of the racing yacht Magic, owned by Frank Osgood of the New York Yacht Club. She was the first American defender during the 1870 America's Cup hosted in New York against the first British challenger Cambria, representing the Royal Thames Yacht Club of London.

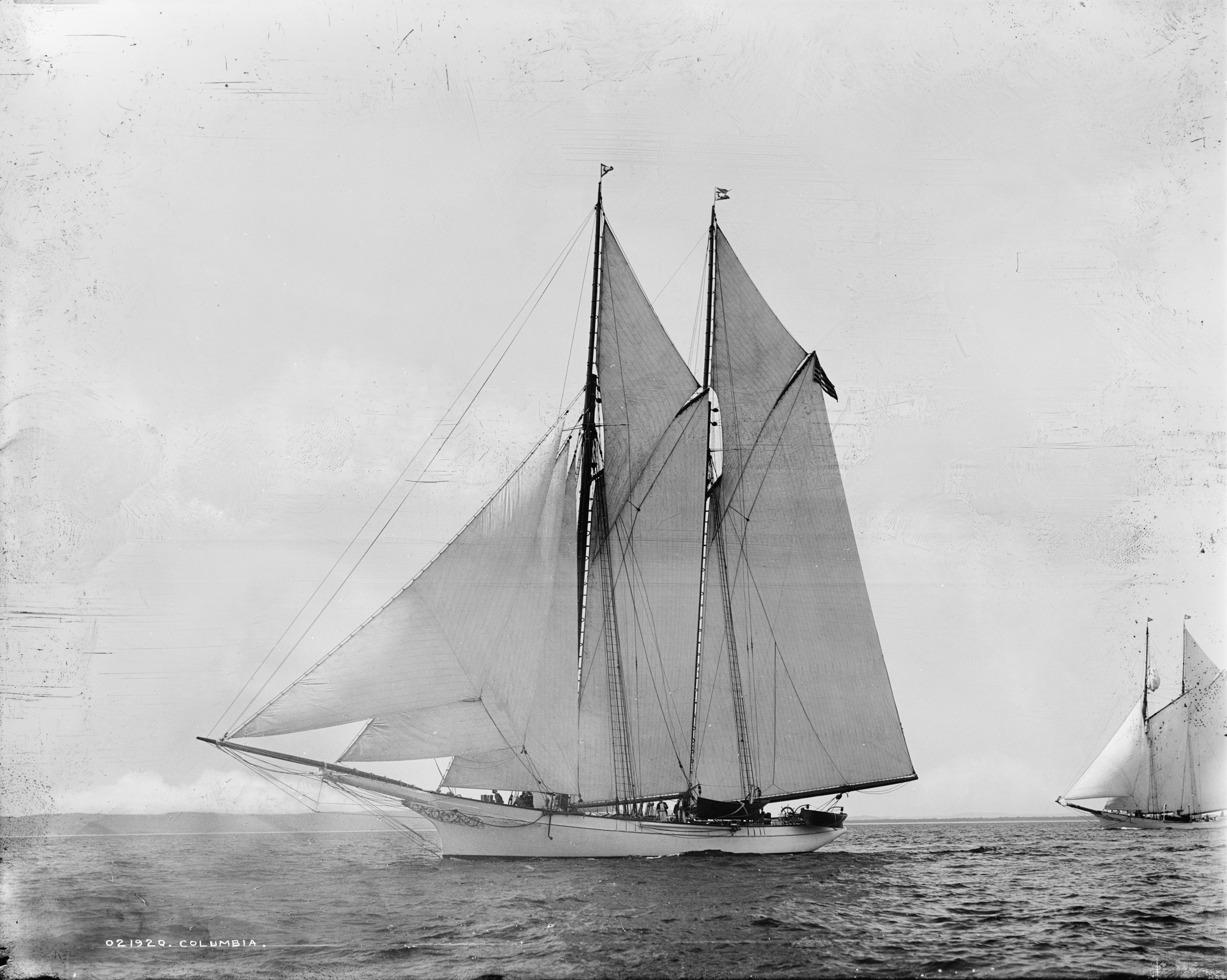
Yacht Columbia was in the second America's Cup race in 1871.

Comstock was master of the schooner-yacht Columbia, built by J.B Van Deusen of New York for Frank Osgood. He sailed the Columbia in the second America's Cup race in 1871 against British challenger yacht Livonia. He won three America's Cup victories with the Columbia, which were in 1871, 1899 and 1901. In 1872, he won the Bennet Cup at Newport, Rhode Island in the Columbia. He continued as master of the Columbia after the yacht was sold to New York actor Lester Wallack in 1872.

For one year, Comstock was master of the schooner yacht Montauk.

== Death ==
Comstock died on July 1, 1910, age 81, at his home in New London, Connecticut. He was one of the oldest members of Union Lodge, No. 31, Ancient Free and Accepted Masons.

== See also ==
- List of Northeastern U. S. Pilot Boats
