= Columbia (1871 yacht) =

Yacht

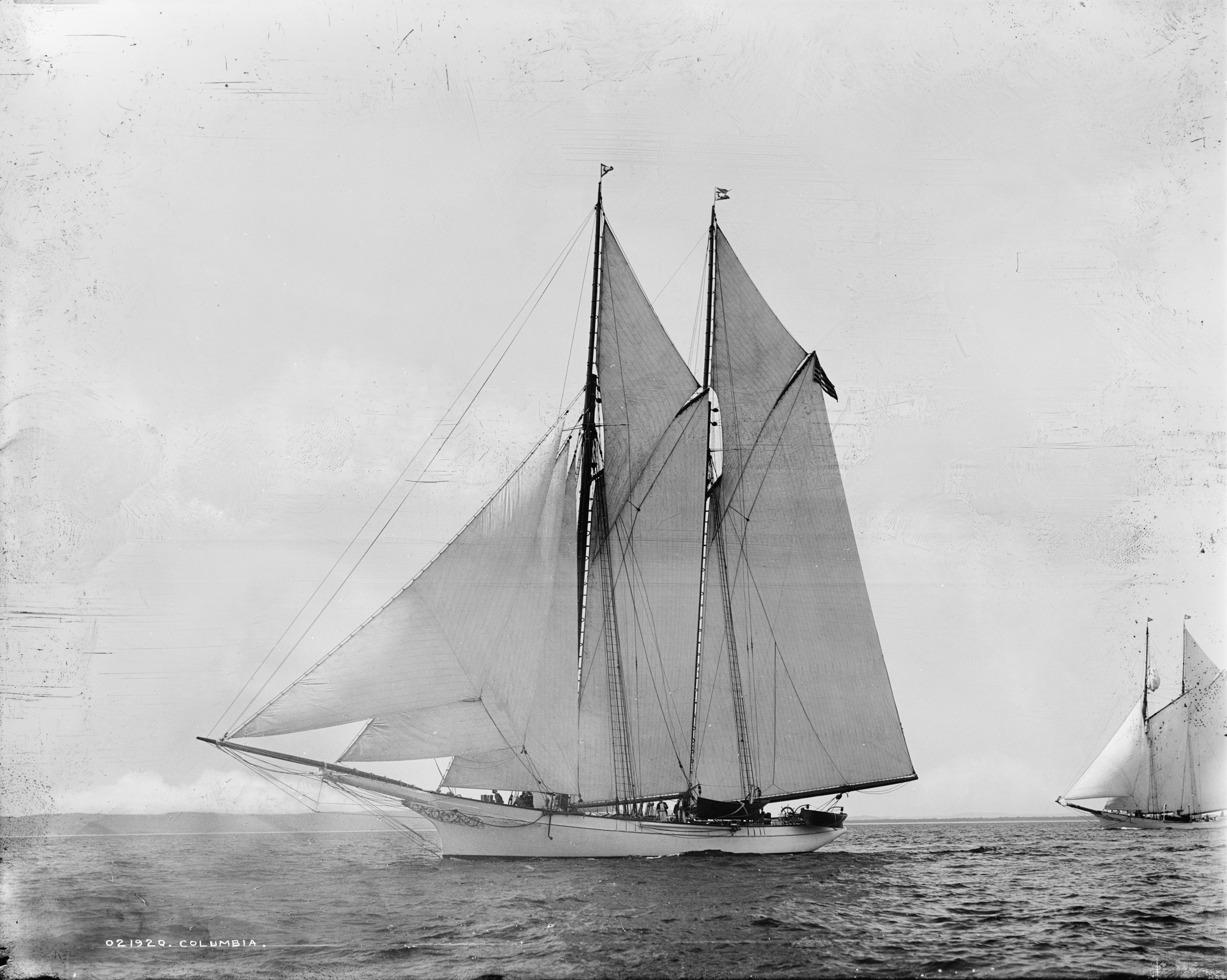
- Columbia, winner of the 1871 America's Cup, as it appeared in the 1890s.
- Yacht club: New York Yacht Club
- Nation: United States
- Class: Yacht
- Designer(s): Joseph B. Van Deusen
- Builder: J.B & J.D. Van Deusen
- Launched: May 10, 1871
- Owner(s): Franklin Osgood
- Fate: Declared lost 1923

Racing career
- Skippers: Andrew J. Comstock
- Notable victories: 1871 America's Cup (with Sappho)
- America's Cup: 1871

Specifications
- Type: Schooner
- Displacement: 220 tons
- Length: 112 ft (34 m) (LOA); 96.5 ft (29.4 m) (LWL)
- Beam: 25.4 ft (7.7 m)
- Draft: 5.9 ft (1.8 m)
- Sail area: 10,225 sq ft (949.9 m^{2})
- Crew: 14

Notes
- Two tanks for 1400 gallons of water

Columbia was one of the two yachts to successfully defend the second America's Cup race in 1871 against English challenger Livonia.

== Design ==
Columbia was a wooden centerboard schooner designed and built in 1871 by J. B. Van Deusen in Chester, Pennsylvania for owner Franklin Osgood of the New York Yacht Club. She was later purchased by Henry M. Flagler.

== Career ==
Skippered by Andrew J. Comstock, Columbia won the first two 1871 best-of-seven races against Livonia. She was beaten by Livonia in the third race, in which Columbia, damaged from the second race, was skippered by Horatio Nelson "Nelse" Comstock. She was the first America's Cup defender to concede a win to the challenger. As Columbia was further damaged in this third race, she was unable to compete in the final races. The yacht Sappho substituted and won the America's Cup for the second time for the U.S.

Comstock continued as master of the Columbia after the yacht was sold to New York actor Lester Wallack in 1872. Wallack updated the staterooms and cabins and enjoyed sailing the Columbia when he was not acting in New York.

== End of career ==
Columbia ended her racing career in 1908, when she was dismasted and used as a houseboat in Brooklyn Harbor on the East River. Three years later she was rebuilt and sailed as a cruiser out of Newport News, VA. In 1920, Columbia was bought by a fisherman. She was declared lost in 1923.
