= USC&GS Eagre =

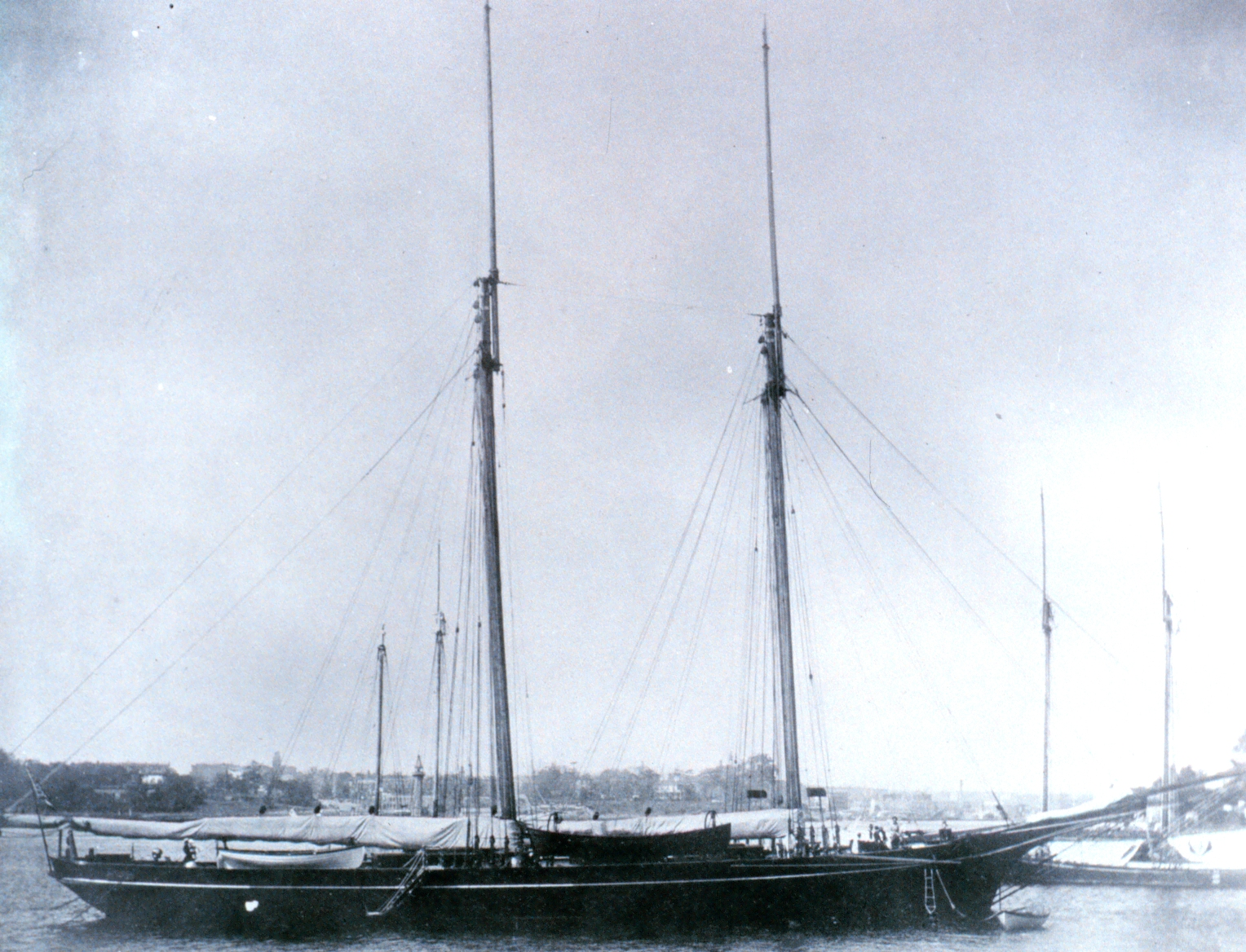
- Eagre, c. 1901

History

United States
- Name: Mohawk
- Owner: William T. Garner
- Builder: J.B & J.D. Van Deusen
- Launched: 10 June 1875
- Fate: Sank on maiden voyage, 20 July 1876

U.S. Coast and Geodetic Survey
- Name: USC&GS Eagre
- Namesake: Eagre
- Acquired: Raised and purchased
- Fate: Transferred to the United States Navy, 31 July 1903

United States Navy
- Name: USS Eagre
- Acquired: 31 July 1903
- Stricken: 10 September 1910
- Home port: Norfolk, Virginia
- Fate: Sold

General characteristics
- Type: Schooner
- Length: 140 ft (42.7 m)
- Armament: None

USC&GS Eagre was a survey ship of the United States Coast and Geodetic Survey which later served in the United States Navy as USS Eagre. She originally was the yacht Mohawk.

== Ship history ==
The schooner-yacht Mohawk was launched from J. B. Van Deusen's shipyard in Williamsburg in Brooklyn, New York, for the millionaire cotton merchant William T. Garner. She was called the "biggest yacht in the world." At 140 feet (42.7 meters) she was the largest racing yacht of her generation. Garner, his wife, and all but two passengers and one crewman were lost when the yacht capsized in a squall during her maiden voyage in New York Harbor on 20 July 1876 off Stapleton on Staten Island. Mohawk was later raised at a cost of US$25,000, bought for the United States Coast and Geodetic Survey, and renamed USC&GS Eagre, taking her name from a term for a tidal bore, which is in turn derived from Ægir the Norse god of the sea.

In 1890 Eagre was part of a squadron of ships under the command of Lieutenant E. M. Hughes making the first systematic survey of the hazardous Nantucket Shoals. The steamer USC&GS A. D. Bache, the schooner Scoresby, and the steam tender Daisy made up the rest of the squadron, with A. D. Bache serving as flagship.

Eagre eventually was transferred from the Coast and Geodetic Service to the United States Navy as USS Eagre on 31 July 1903, initially for use as tender to USS Franklin, the receiving ship at Naval Station Norfolk in Norfolk, Virginia, and as training ship for apprentice seamen in the Chesapeake Bay area. These duties terminated in late 1906, and she remained at Norfolk until approved for use as a barracks ship for enlisted men who were attached to the Norfolk Navy Yard in Portsmouth, Virginia. She was stricken on 10 September 1910 and sold.
