= Gracie (yacht) =

American racing yacht built in 1868

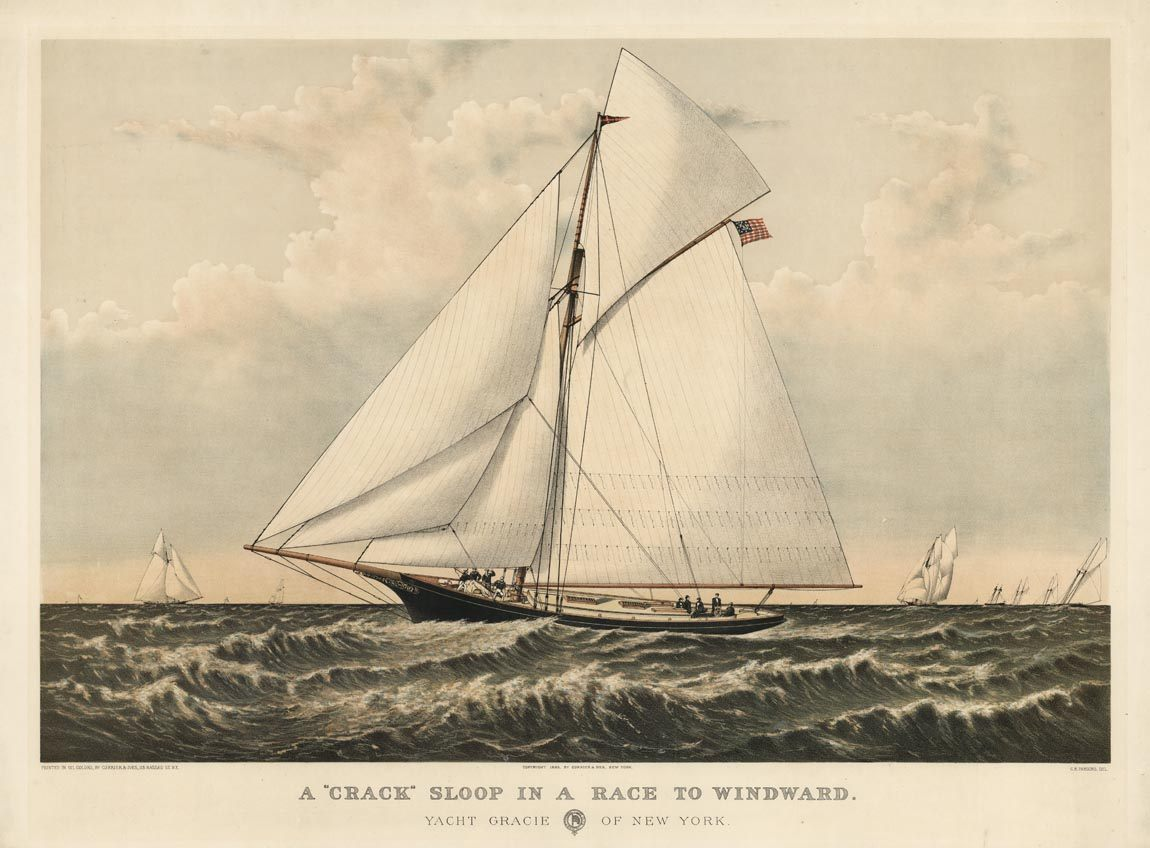
- The yacht Gracie.
- Yacht club: New York Yacht Club
- Nation: United States
- Designer(s): Abraham A. Schank
- Builder: James E. Smith
- Launched: July 1868
- Owner(s): Charles Ranlett Flint, Joseph P. Earle
- Fate: Sold

Racing career
- Skippers: Joseph P. Earle
- Notable victories: 1868, 1878, 1881
- America's Cup: 1881

Specifications
- Type: Centerboard sloop
- Displacement: 776 T
- Length: 58 ft 6 in (17.83 m) (LOA); 81 ft 1.5 in (24.727 m) (LWL)
- Beam: 18 ft 9 in (5.72 m)
- Draft: 5 ft 6 in (1.68 m)
- Sail area: 5,400 sq ft (500 m^{2})

The Gracie was a 19th-century racing sloop yacht built in 1868 by James E. Smith shipyard at Nyack, New York. She raced the America's Cup defender Mischief in the trails off Sandy Hook in 1881. Gracie raced at the New York Yacht Club, Atlantic Yacht Club and other eastern yacht clubs. After a 42-year career in racing, she was sold in 1909 and converted to a freight boat sailing from Milton Point, off Long Island to New York.

== Construction and service ==
The yacht Gracie was launched in July 1868, modeled and built at James E. Smith shipyard at Nyack, New York, by builder A. G. Polhemus, from a model by Abraham A. Schank, for Commodore William Voorhis. Her building was supervised by Voorhis. The yacht was 58.6 feet long, 18.9 breadth, 6.6 depth, 5.6 draft and 40-tons.

On September 25, 1868, Gracie raced for the Atlantic Yacht Club with William Voorhis in command. She won in the first class sloop class.

She raced at the New York Yacht Club (1872-1874, 1880, 1882); Sea Cliff Boating Club (1875); Queens Country Club (1876); and the Atlantic Yacht Club (1868, 1881).

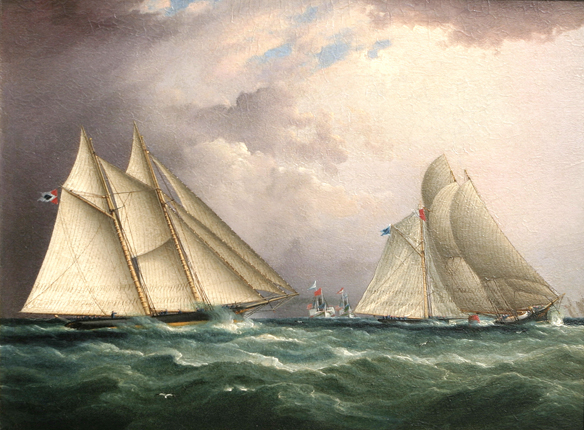
Sappho Leads Gracie and Dauntless at the Cape May Race by James E. Buttersworth.

On July 5, 1871, Sappho won the citizens prize for schooners in the 1871 Cape May race. The Gracie won the citizens prize for sloops. The Columbia and Dauntless were also in the race.

On July 18, 1876, yacht Gracie, from the N.Y.Y.C, with Mr. Halsey, was towed from the Herald telegraph station to New York.

On October 23, 1878, yacht Gracie raced in a match with the sloop yacht Vision starting at the Sandy Hook Light and sailing twenty miles and back to the lightship. The Gracie won a $250 silver Cup.

In 1878, she was rebuilt by David Carll at City Island. Her dimensions were increased to 69 feet long, 21.6 breadth, 6.8 depth and 6.6 draft.

In 1880, yacht Gracie was sold to Charles Ranlett Flint and Joseph P. Earle from the New York Yacht Club. Flint was an avid sportsman and yachtsman. He was a member of the syndicate that built the yacht Vigilant, that was the U.S. defender of the eight America's Cup.

=== Trial races for the America's Cup ===
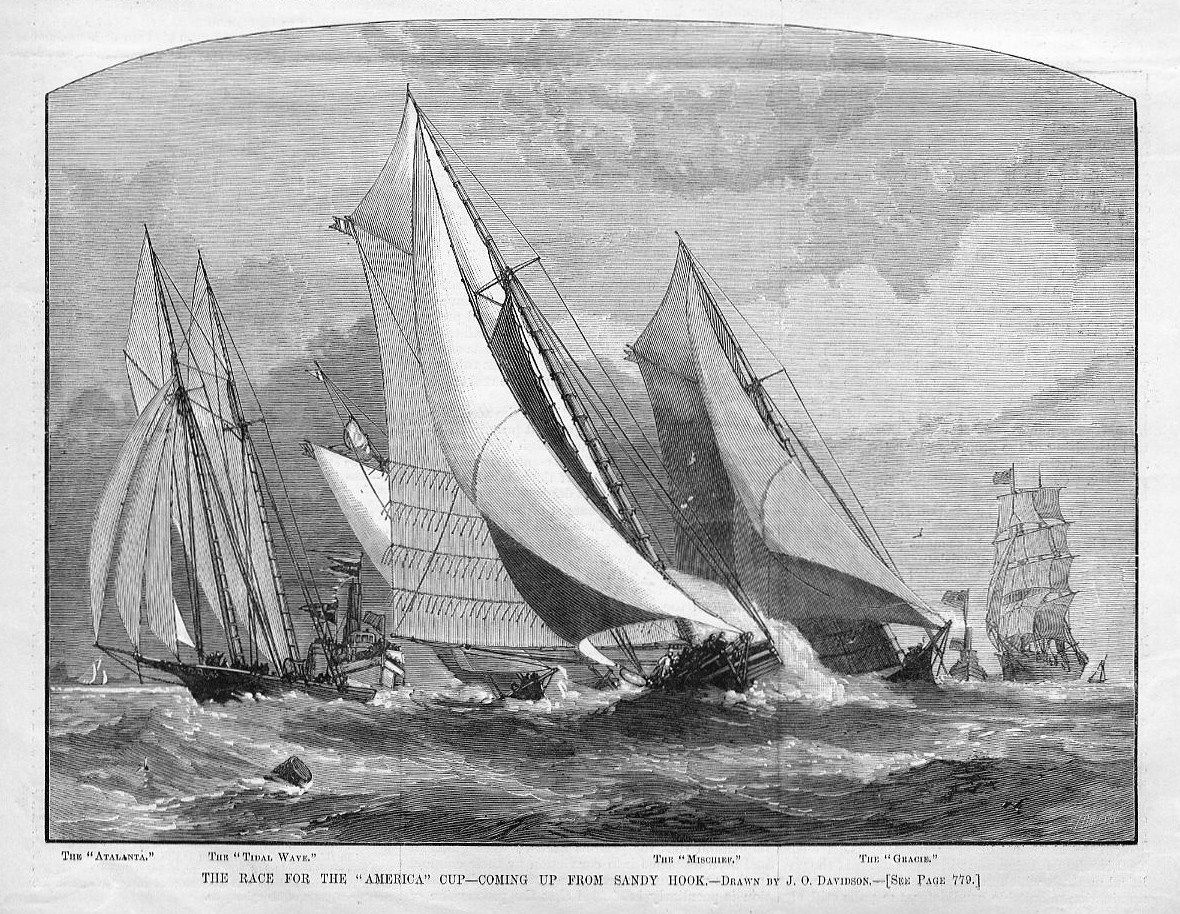
The Race for America's Cup.

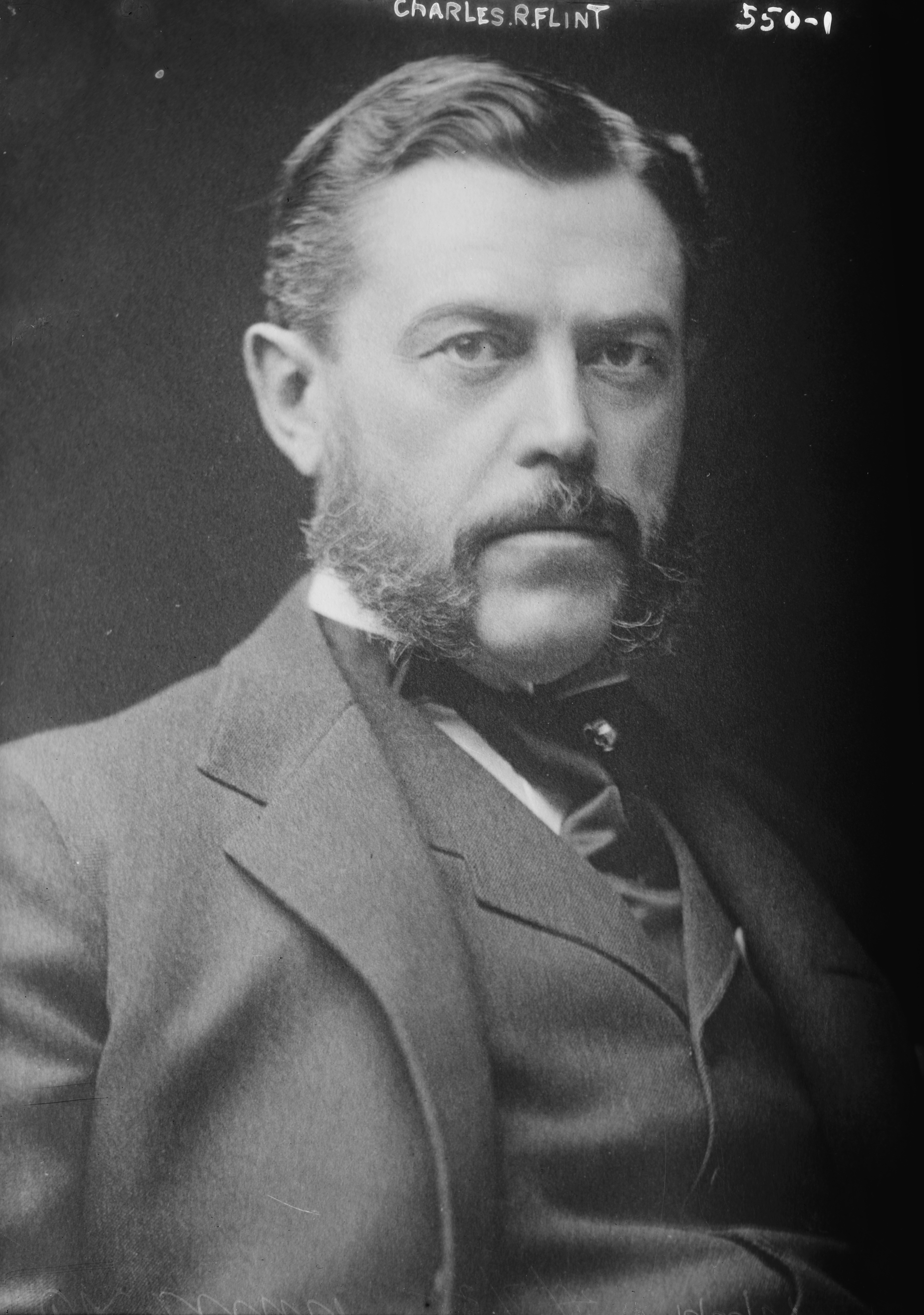
Yachtsman Charles Ranlett Flint.

Gracie raced the America's Cup defender Mischief in trails off Sandy Hook in early 1881. On August 5, 1881, Gracie beat the Mischief for the Spirit of the Times Cup in New Bedford regatta of New York and Eastern Clubs for two $500 cups. The Gracie claimed to have won the race.

On October 20, 1881, the Gracie won in a trial yacht race between the yachts Mischief and Pocahontas. The expectation was that the Gracie would be selected to sail against the Atlanta for the America's Cup.

On November 11, 1881, the Gracie was the principal competitor of the Mischief for the honor of defending the America's Cup. The Mischief was selected over the Gracie, who came in second, but some felt that the Gracie should have been selected on account of her sailing qualities as an American yacht. The selection of the Mischief over the Gracie was criticized because her owner was an Englishman, and not a naturalized citizen of the United States, and the Gracie was believed to be the better boat. The owners were Joseph Pitnam Earle and Charles R. Flint. After the Mischief was selected, the Gracie sailed a leeward race on the first day against the challenger and defender, the Canadian yacht Atlanta, and the Gracie won.

In October 1883, there were two races. The first was the Goelet Cup regatta, sponsored by Ogden Goelet, for the New York Yacht Club at Newport, Rhode Island on August 6, 1883. The course was from Brenton Reef Lightship around Sow & Pigs Lightship (now Vineyard Sound) and return home. The Montauk, owned by Samuel R. Platt, won the $1,000 cup for schooners and the Gracie, owned by Flint & Earles, won the Goelet prize for sloops. The second race was on October 11, 1883, between the sloop yacht Gracie and Fanny, of New York. They started from Sandy Hook. The Gracie came in second

On April 20, 1884, Joseph P. Earle purchased the Gracie from shares that Charles R. Flint owned. He was in the process of fitting out the yacht for commission in the upcoming May races.

On August 23, 1885, the trial race between the Priscilla, Puritan, Gracie, and Genesta. The Gracie came in third place. The Puritan was selected to sail in the America's Cup against the Genesta.

On May 23, 1886, Earle's sloop yacht Gracie from the New York Yacht Club, had repairs done at the Henry Piepgras' shipyard in Greenpoint, Brooklyn. She raced in 1887, against the Dauntless, Montauk, and Fanny. On April 12, 1889, the sloop Gracie was fitted out at City Island.

March 24, 1895, the yacht Gracie, and Joseph P. Earle of the N.Y.Y.C, were at Nyack, New York, was given a new rig for a commission to sail at the upcoming regattas. Sails were provided by Sawyer & Son.

== End of service ==
After a 42-year career in racing, she was sold in 1909 and converted to a freight boat sailing from Milton Point, off Long Island to New York.
