= Magic (yacht) =

Racing schooner yacht

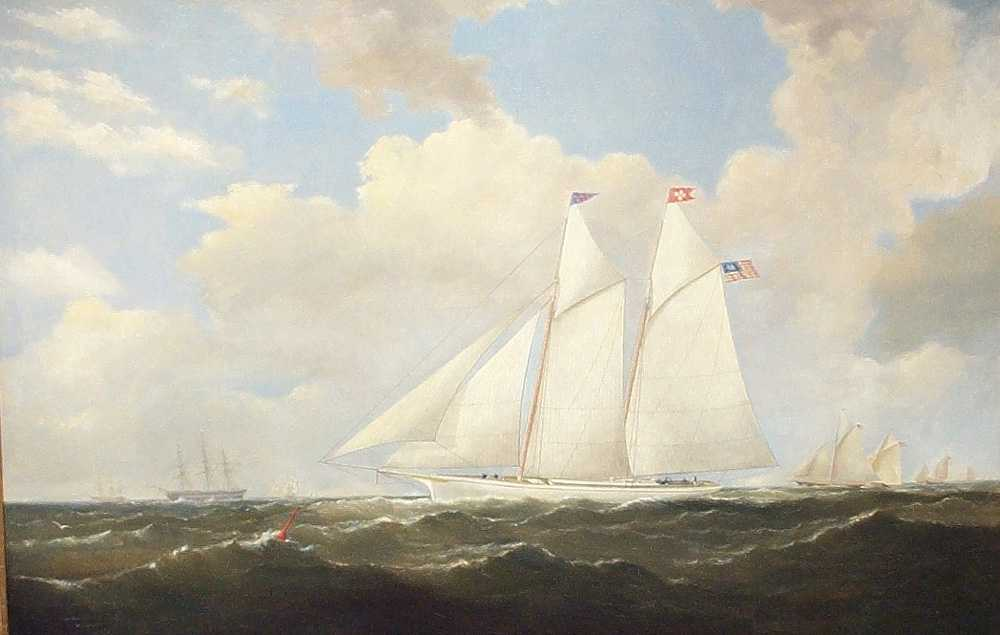
- Painting of the New York Yacht Schooner Magic, by Charles Gulager
- Yacht club: New York Yacht Club
- Nation: United States
- Builder: T. Byerly & Son of Philadelphia
- Launched: 1857
- Owner(s): Richard Fanning Loper (1857); Franklin Osgood and others
- Fate: Sank, May 3, 1922

Racing career
- Skippers: Andrew J. Comstock
- Notable victories: 1870 America's Cup (with Cambria, )
- America's Cup: 1857

Specifications
- Type: Gaff schooner
- Displacement: 92.2 tons
- Length: 84 m (276 ft) (LOA); 36.40 m (119.4 ft) (LWL)
- Beam: 21 m (69 ft)
- Draft: 7 m (23 ft)
- Sail area: 1,170 m^{2} (12,600 sq ft)

The Magic was a racing schooner yacht, of the New York Yacht Club. She was the first American defender during the 1870 America's Cup hosted in New York against the 1st British challenger Cambria, representing the Royal Thames Yacht Club of London. The Magic, had 19 owners. Her last owner modified her into a pilot boat at Key West. In 1922, during a hurricane, she was wrecked on the beach in Key West.

== Design ==
The Magic, was built by T. Byerly & Son of Philadelphia in 1857 for Captain Richard Fanning Loper as a sloop. Loper did the original model and design for his boat. She was christened the Madgie.

She was rebuilt several times, In 1859, Loper modified the Madgie from a sloop to a schooner and renamed her Magic. In 1860, Loper modified Magic by lengthening her bow. He then sold the Magic in 1864, to William H. McVickar of the New York Yacht Club. Yachtsman George L. Lorillard bought the Magic, late in 1866 and sold her to H. W. Gray. In 1869, he sold her to Franklin Osgood.

In 1869, the Magic, was taken to City Island where she was completely rebuilt by the shipbuilder David Carll. Carll lengthened and widened the Magic, with increased draft; and converted her into a centerboard schooner yacht for Franklin Osgood.

== Operational history ==
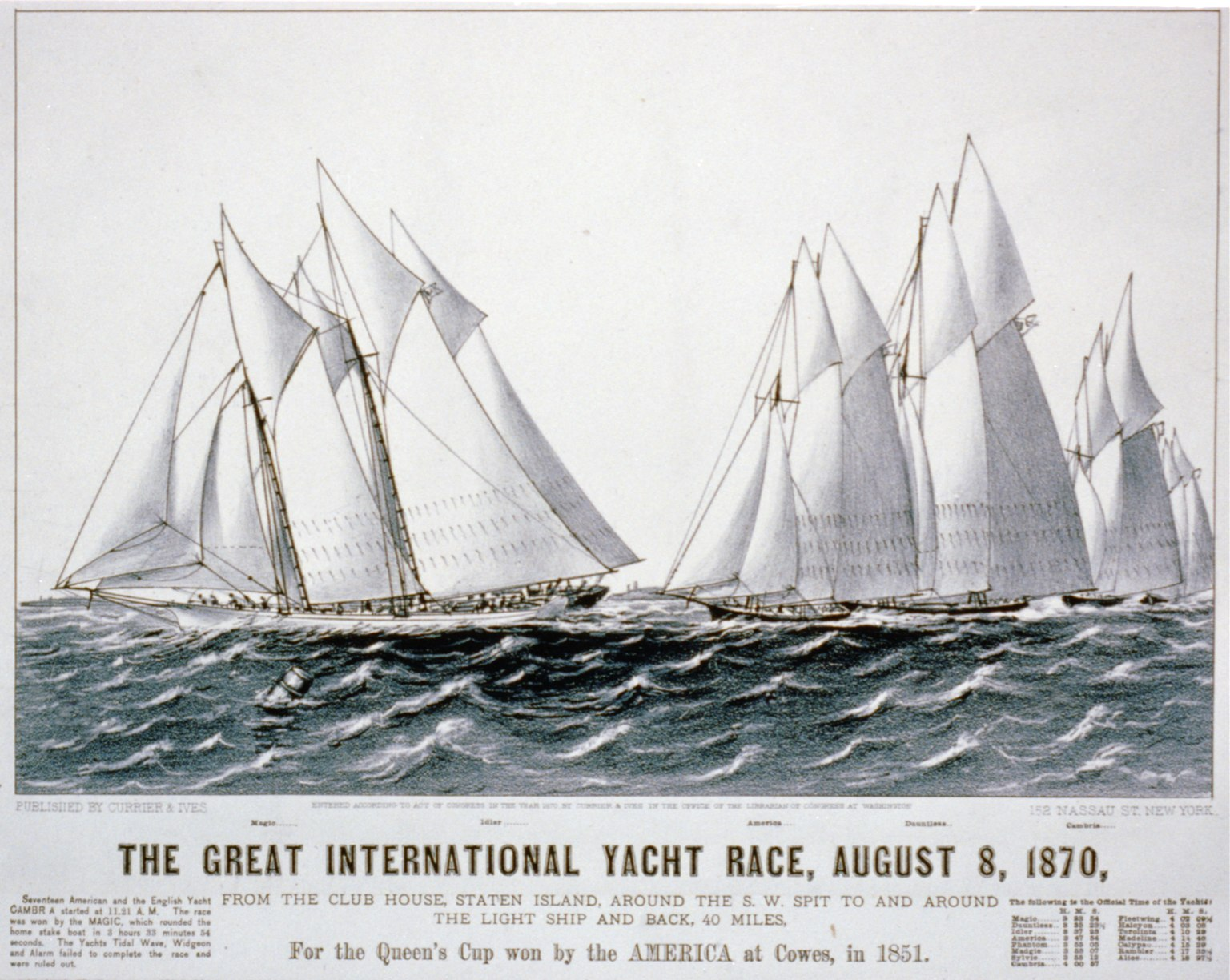
Magic, at the start of the International Yacht Race, August 8, 1870.

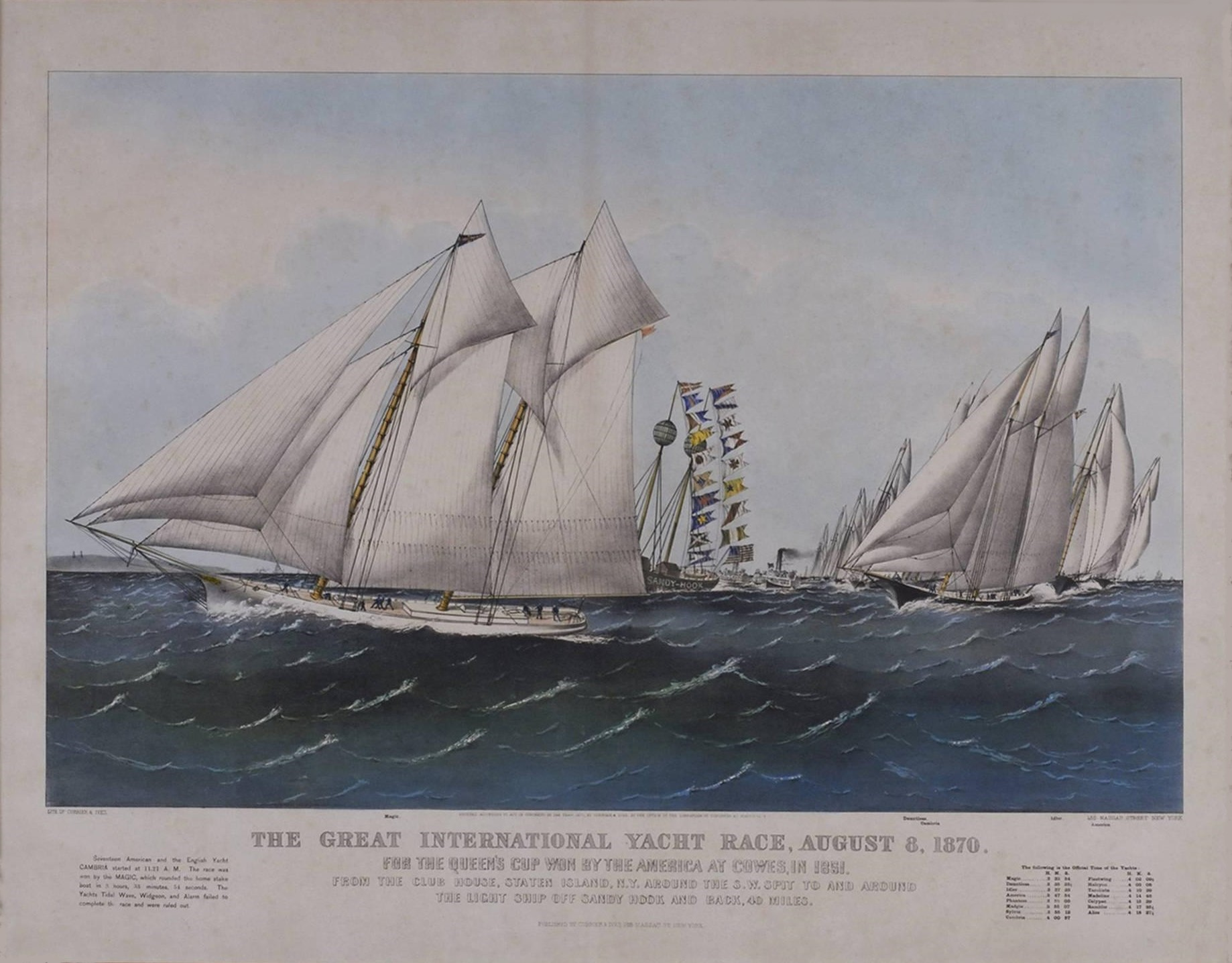
Magic, rounding the home stake boat at Sandy Hook. A print from Currier & Ives

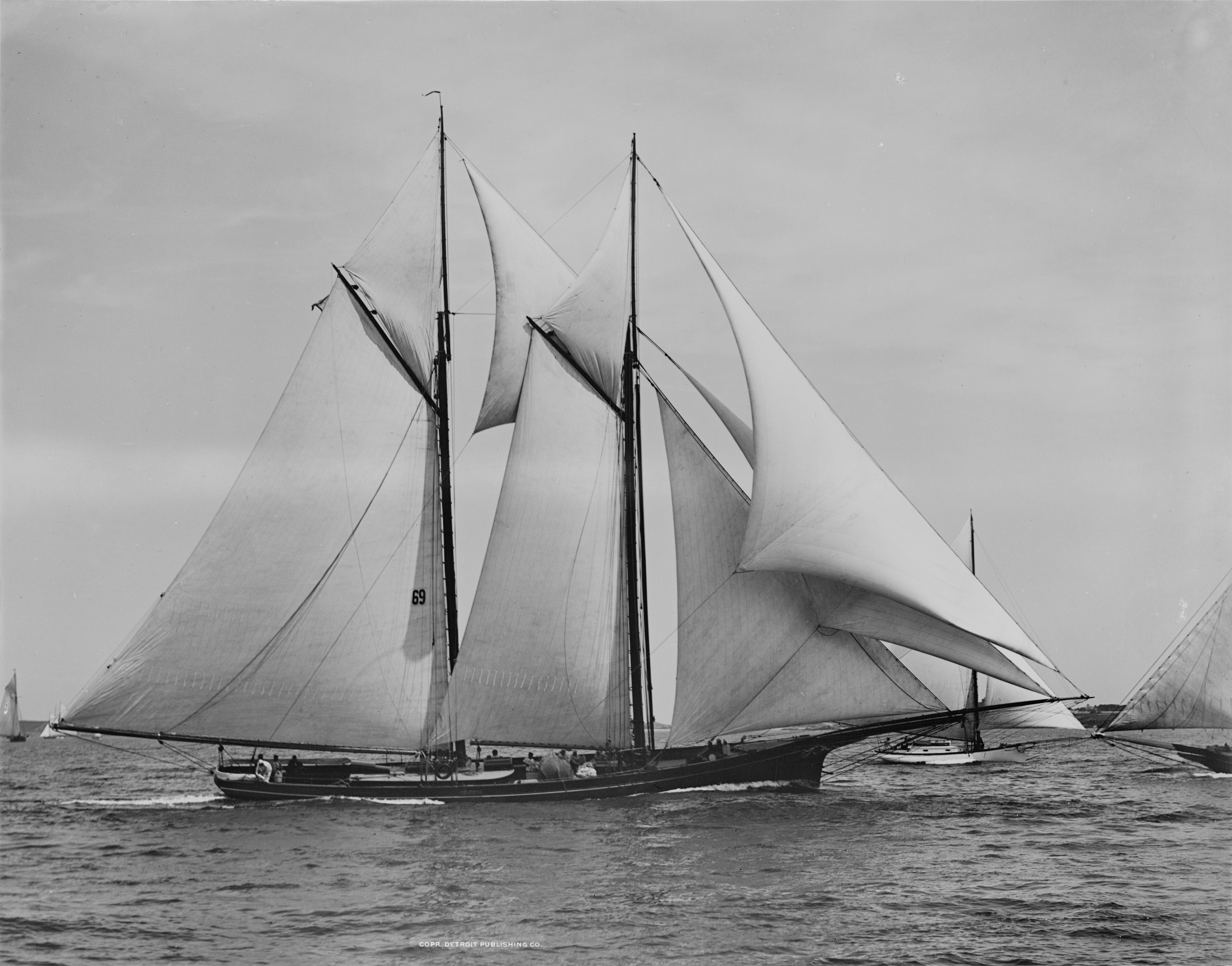
Schooner yacht Magic.

The schooner Magic represented the New York Yacht Club and was the smallest sailboat in the international 1870 America's Cup competition. The first official challenge took place on August 8, 1870, in New York Harbor and was won by Franklin Osgood's American yacht Magic. She beat 17 competitors, including the English yacht Cambria and the yachts Dauntless, Idler, Fleetwing, Phantom, America and others.Andrew J. Comstock was captain of the Magic and had a stateroom in the forward section of the boat. The course of the race was from the Club House, Staten Island, N.Y. around the S.W. Spit to and the light ship off Sandy Hook and back, 40 miles. Seventeen American and the English yacht Cambria started at 11.21 A. M. The race was won by Magic, which rounded the home stake boat in 3 hours, 33 minutes, 54 seconds. The Yachts Tidal Wave, Widgeon, and Alarm failed to complete the race and were ruled out.

On October 11, 1870, the Magic was sold by Franklin Osgood to Lester Wallack, for $16,500. Osgood bought her back but sold her to Rufus Hatch in 1873. In 1874, she was purchased by William T. Garner, who kept her until 1876, when Osgood bought her back for a third time. In 1879, she was bought by Francis M. Weld of Boston, who sold her to Thurston N. McKay after owning for only two years. McKay kept her for three years and then she went back to the Weld family in 1885. She was later bought by Augustus W. Mott who kept her for ten years, when John S. Clarke & Bros., of Pittsburg bought her in 1898. He in turn sold her to a Key West group that modified her as a pilot boat.

On February 1, 1908, the Magic sank when she was racing into port and was capsized at Key West. Her owner was John Lowe Jr. The Magic had 19 owners, including the United States Navy, which used her as a supply craft during the 1898 Spanish–American War.

== End of service ==
On May 3, 1922, the schooner Magic, went ashore on the beach in the bay at Key West when she received damage during a hurricane. Her owner, John Lowe Jr., had the boat moved offshore and destroyed with explosives.
