= 1870 America's Cup =

Yacht race hosted in the United States

1st America's Cup
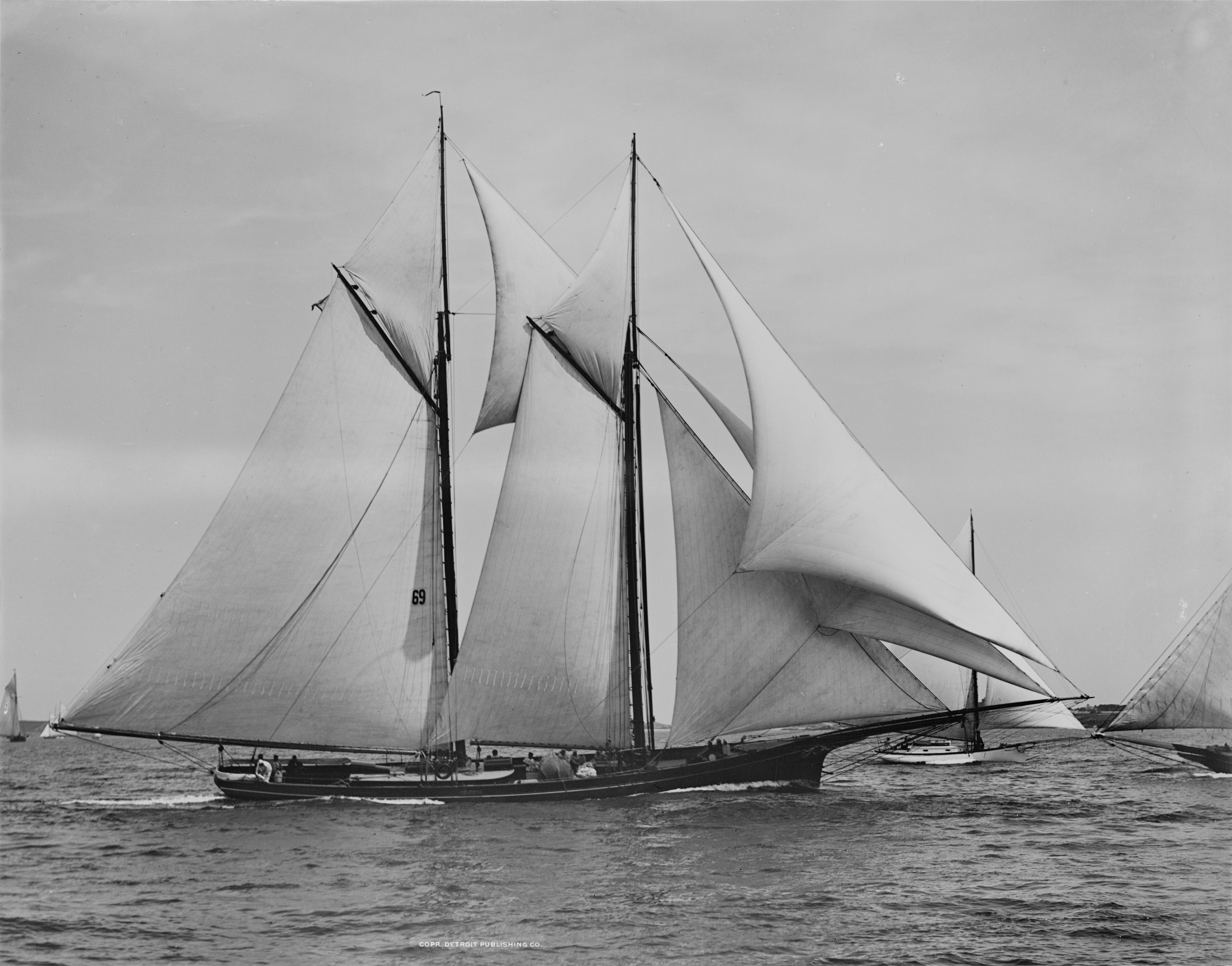

Defender United States
- Defender club: New York Yacht Club
- Yacht: 17 schooners, including Magic

Challenger United Kingdom
- Challenger club: Royal Thames Yacht Club
- Yacht: Cambria

Competition
- Location: Newport, Rhode Island, United States
- Dates: 1870
- Winner: New York Yacht Club
- Score: 1–0

The 1870 America's Cup was the first America's Cup competition to be hosted in the United States, and the first "America's Cup" due to the trophy being renamed from the 100 Guineas Cup of 1851. It was the first competition after the founding of the "America's Cup" event with the deed of gift in 1857.

James Lloyd Ashbury's yacht Cambria sailed to New York on behalf of the Royal Thames Yacht Club.

The New York Yacht Club entered 17 schooners, and the race was won by Franklin Osgood's Magic.

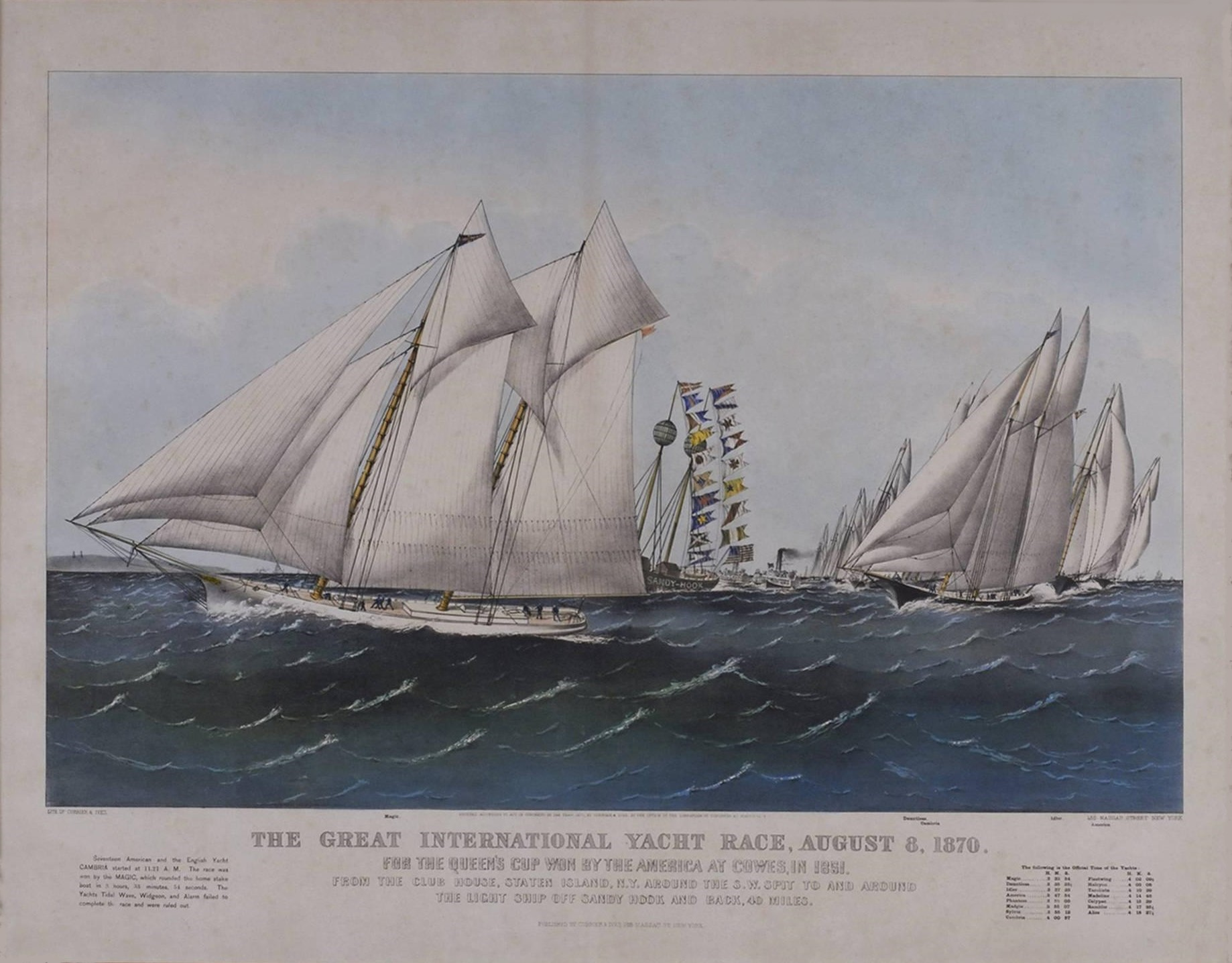
The Great International Yacht Race, August 8, 1870. A print from Currier & Ives

The course of the race was from the Club House, Staten Island, N.Y. around the S.W. Spit to and the light ship off Sandy Hook and back, 40 miles. Seventeen American and the English yacht Cambria started at 11.21 A. M. The race was won by Magic, which rounded the home stake boat in 3 hours, 33 minutes, 54 seconds. The Yachts Tidal Wave, Widgeon, and Alarm failed to complete the race and were ruled out.

== Results ==
Standing	Yacht	Cor. Time	Notes
Winner	Magic	3h58'21"	
2nd	Idler	4h09'35"	
3rd	Silvie	4h23'45"	
4th	America	4h23'51"	
5th	Dauntless	4h29'19"	
6th	Madgie	4h29'57"	
7th	Phantom	4h30'44"	
8th	Alice	4h34'15"	
9th	Halcyon	4h35'00"	
10th	Cambria	4h37'38"	
11th	Calypso	4h40'21"	
12th	Fleetwing	4h41'20"	
13th	Madeleine	4h42'35"	
14th	Tarolinta	4h47'29"	
15th	Rambler	4h48'33"	
