= Narrows =

Restricted land or water passage

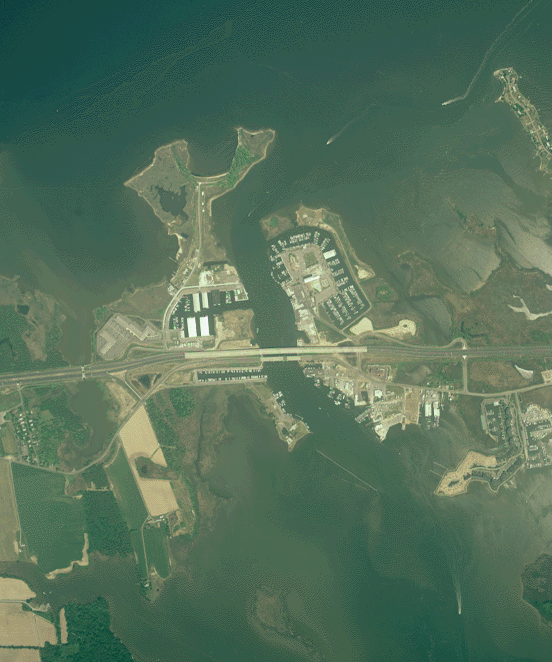
Kent Narrows separating Kent Island from the Eastern Shore of Maryland.

A narrows or narrow (used interchangeably but usually in the plural form), is a restricted land or water passage. Most commonly a narrows is a strait, though it can also be a water gap.

A narrows may form where a stream passes through a tilted bed of hard rock lying between two softer beds: "[i]f the hard beds are vertical, so that their outcrop does not shift as erosion proceeds, a narrows is developed". Like a dam, this "raises the water level for a short distance upriver". A narrows is also typically a good location for trapping migrating fish. Furthermore, a narrows is "an important topographical feature for wind mixing", an effect where a wind chill may form ice while the surrounding temperature remains above freezing.

== See also ==
- Water gap
- The Narrows, which separates Staten Island from Brooklyn and connects the upper and lower sections of New York Bay.
- The Narrows, which is the narrowest section of Zion Canyon in Zion National Park, Utah.
