= J.B & J.D. Van Deusen =

Early American shipbuilder

- Company type: Private
- Industry: Shipbuilding
- Genre: Written
- Founders: Joseph B. Van Deusen, James D. Van Deusen
- Fate: Closed
- Headquarters: Williamsburg, Brooklyn
- Area served: New York State
- Products: Wooden-hulled steamships and other watercraft
- Services: Ship repairs

J.B & J.D. Van Deusen was a 19th-century American shipbuilding company started by Joseph B. Van Deusen and James D. Van Deusen in 1865. The shipyard was in Williamsburg, Brooklyn. They designed and built yachts, schooners and steamboats in New York. The last boat that was built at the shipyard was the schooner-yacht Mohawk in 1875, which was later renamed Eagre and transferred to the United States Navy in 1903.

== History ==
Joseph B. Van Deusen and his brother James D. Van Deusen started the J.B & J.D. Van Deusen shipyard in 1865, at first located at the foot of 16th Street, New York, then later at Sixth Street in Williamsburg, Brooklyn near the East River. They built many notable yachts, schooners and steamboats.

The Etna Iron Works produced at least a dozen engines for the Van Deusen Brothers.

=== Joseph Benoni Van Deusen ===
Van Deusen came to New York City for the purpose of studying ship building at William H. Webb's Shipbuilding Academy and also with George Steers. When his studies were completed he went into the business with his brother, James DeWitt Van Deusen under the firm name of J D & J B Van Deusen, where they built many notable boats.

Van Deusen was friends with publisher and Yachtsman James Gordon Bennett Jr., and banker and yachtsman Elias Cornelius Benedict. He built the first steamships used by the Fall River Line on the sound and about 30 gunboats for Spain. He was the recipient of a medal from Napoleon III for his models.

In December 1866, J. B. Van Deusen of the New York Yacht Club was a judge on the Fleeting in a race between three American yachts, the Vesta (owned by Pierre Lorillard IV), the Fleetwing (owned by George and Franklin Osgood) and the Henrietta owned by Bennett. Each yachtsman put up $30,000 in the winner-take-all wager. They started off of Sandy Hook, New Jersey, on December 11, 1866, during high westerly winds and raced to The Needles, the furthest westerly point on the Isle of Wight. Bennett's Henrietta won with a time of 13 days, 21 hours, 55 minutes.

Joseph B. Van Deusen died, at age 43, in Brooklyn, New York, on November 4, 1875.

== See also ==
- List of Northeastern U. S. Pilot Boats
