= Melges IC37 =

Sailboat class

Development
- Designer: Mark Mills and SDK Structures
- Location: America
- Year: 2018
- No. built: Approx. 40
- Brand: Melges Performance Sailboats
- Builders: Westerly Marine (USA)& Fibre Mechanics (GBR)
- Role: One design racer
- Name: Melges IC37

Boat
- Displacement: 3,535 kg (7,793 lb)
- Draft: 2.50 m (8.2 ft)

Hull
- Type: monohull
- Construction: glassfibre
- LOH: 11.30 m (37.1 ft)
- LWL: 10.60 m (34.8 ft)
- Beam: 3.65 m (12.0 ft)
- Engine: Yanmar 3YM 20 hp (15 kW) diesel engine with saildrive

Hull appendages
- Keel: T Keel
- Ballast: 1,530 kg (3,373 lb)
- Rudder: Spade-type rudder

Rig
- Rig type: Bermuda rig
- I foretriangle height: 15.45 m (50.7 ft)
- J foretriangle base: 4.39 m (14.4 ft)
- P mainsail luff: 14.79 m (48.5 ft)
- E mainsail foot: 5.00 m (16.40 ft)

Sails
- Sailplan: Fractional rigged sloop
- Mainsail area: 25 m^{2} (270 sq ft)
- Jib/genoa area: 48.5 m^{2} (522 sq ft)
- Gennaker area: 154 m^{2} (1,660 sq ft)
- Upwind sail area: 85.9 m^{2} (925 sq ft)
- Downwind sail area: 194.5 m^{2} (2,094 sq ft)

Racing
- Rating: 1.175 IRC

The Melges IC37 is an American planing sailboat that was designed by Mark Mills as a one design racer and first built in 2017.

== Production ==
The design was initial built by Westerly Marine in United States but Fibre Mechanics based in Lymington in England were soon added to increase production capacity. The initial 20 boats are all owned by the New York Yacht Club based in Newport, Rhode Island. Additional boats were sold to NYYC members and international with boats also sold to Royal Yacht Squadron members racing in the Solent.

== Design ==
The boat was conceived by New York Yacht Club following an evolution of designs to replace the ClubSwan 42 fleet which were over 10 years old. The boat was targeted at the younger members closer to high performance racing yachts like the TP52 than previous boats which were genuine racers/cruiser yachts with a cruising interior.

The boat was designed by Mark Mills with KND Sailing Performance performing the CFD and VPP Analysis and the Structural Engineering: SDK Structures. In addition North Sails Group were responsible for the rig and sail development.

== See also ==
- NYYC Invitational Cup
- New York Yacht Club
- ClubSwan 42
- Swan 47-2
