= New York Yacht Club =

Social club in New York City

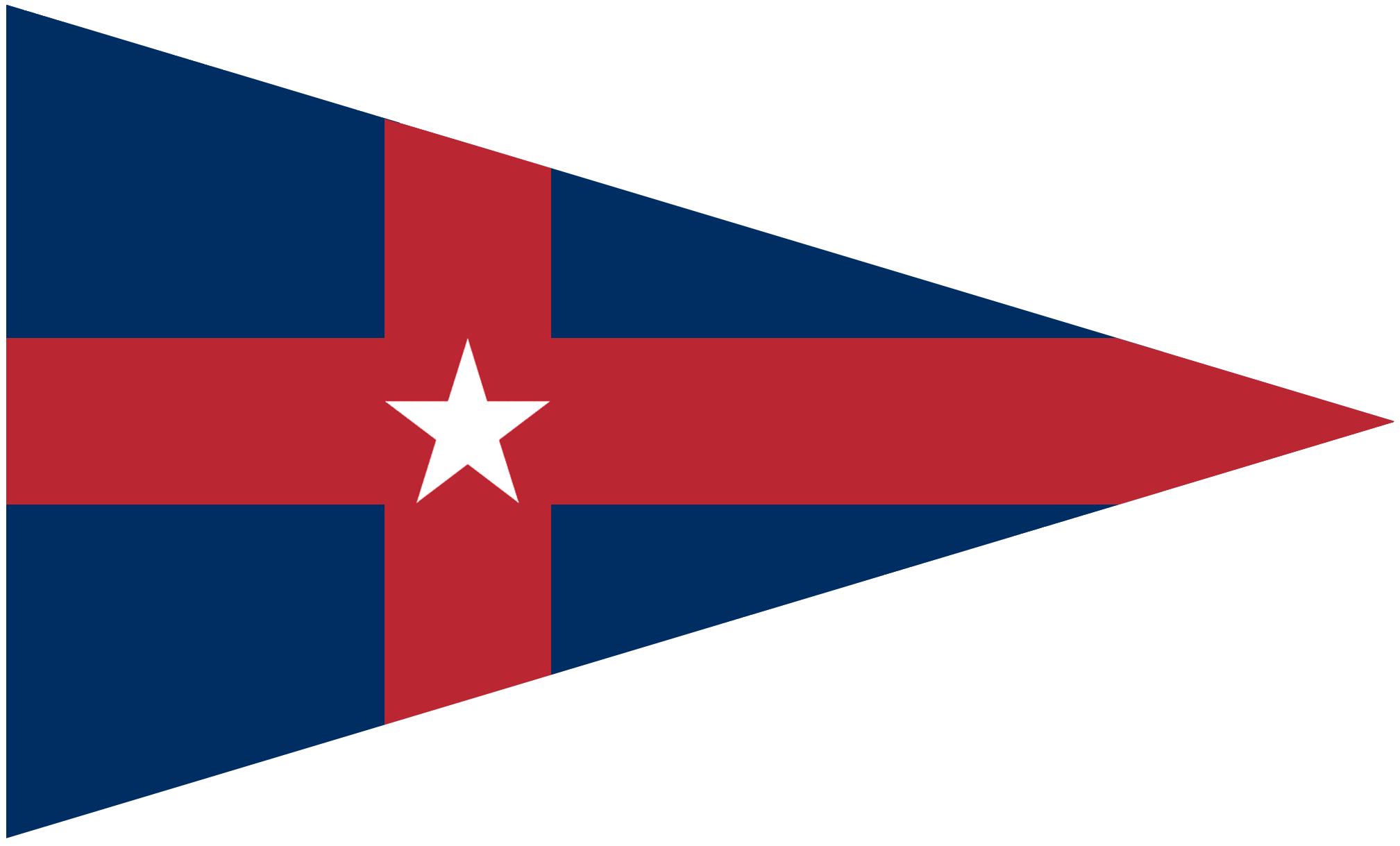
- Burgee
- Short name: NYYC
- Founded: July 30, 1844; 182 years ago
- Location: 37 West 44th Street, New York, New York; Harbour Court, Newport, Rhode Island
- Website: www.nyyc.org

The New York Yacht Club (NYYC) is a private social club and yacht club based in New York City and Newport, Rhode Island. It was founded in 1844 by nine prominent sportsmen. The members have contributed to the sport of yachting and yacht design. As of 2001, the organization was reported to have about 3,000 members. Membership in the club is by invitation only. Its officers include a commodore, vice-commodore, rear-commodore, secretary and treasurer.

The club is headquartered at the New York Yacht Club Building in New York City. The America's Cup trophy was won by members in 1851 and held by the NYYC until 1983. The NYYC successfully defended the trophy twenty-four times in a row before being defeated by the Royal Perth Yacht Club, represented by the yacht Australia II. The NYYC's reign was the longest winning streak as measured by years in the history of all sports.

The New York Yacht Club has EIN 13-1102800 under the designation 501(c)(7) Social and Recreation Clubs; in 2024 it had total revenue of $28,887,365 and total assets of $54,729,191. The New York Yacht Club Foundation publicly states its mission as "the preservation of the historic clubhouse at 37 West 44th Street in New York City and the equally historic main house and property at Harbour Court in Newport, RI. The preservation of these magnificent and treasured buildings is central to the Club’s history and accomplished through a long-term program of Foundation grants." It has EIN 20-8288446 as a 501(c)(3) Public Charity; in 2024 it claimed $3,397,813 in total revenue and total assets of $10,470,059.

The NYYC entered 2021 and 2024 America's Cup competition under the syndicate name American Magic.

== Clubhouses ==
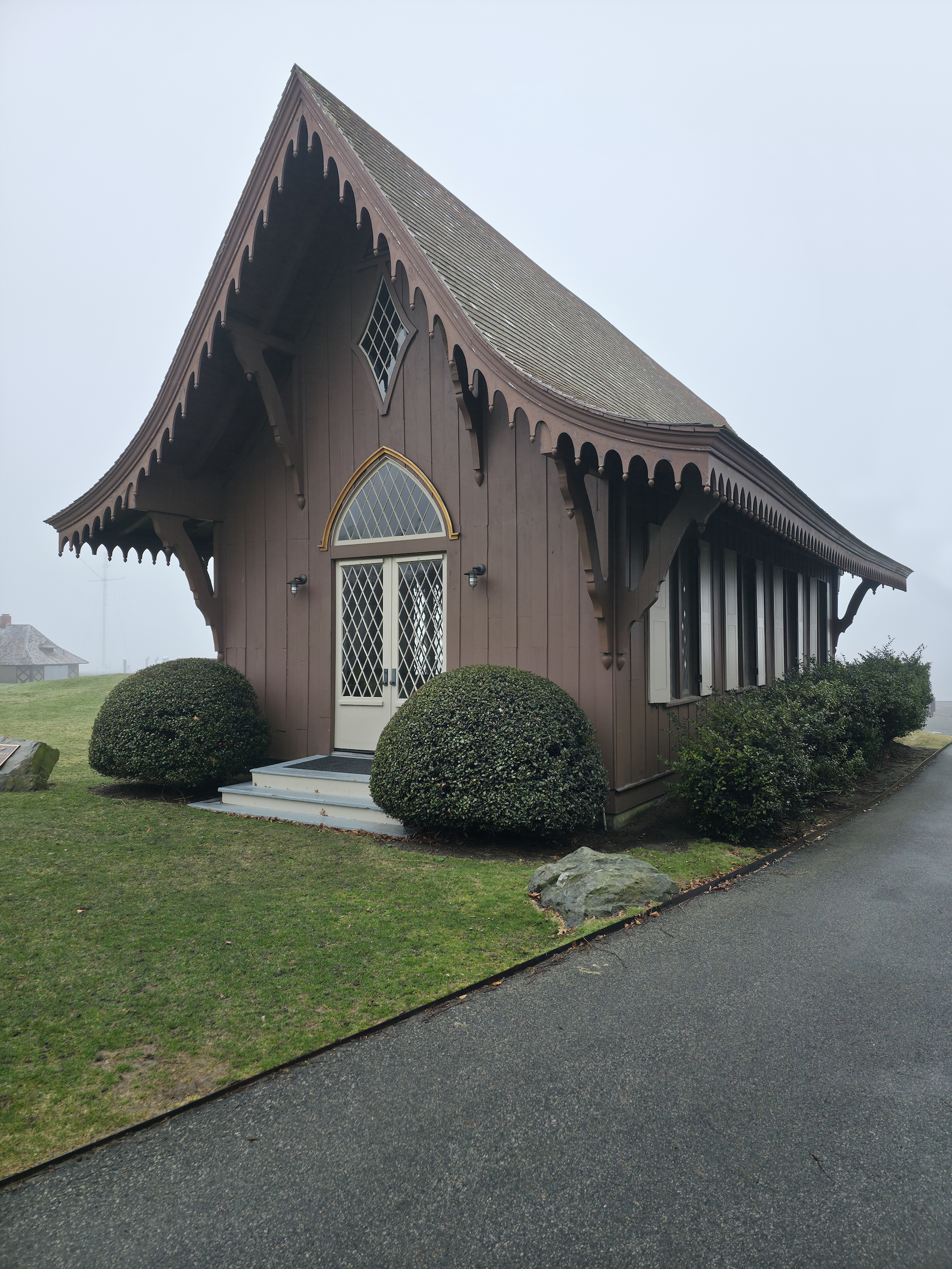
Original Clubhouse built by Alexander Jackson Davis now in Newport, RI

In 1845, the club's first clubhouse was established—a modest, Gothic-revival building in Hoboken, New Jersey, designed by architect Alexander Jackson Davis, on land donated by Commodore John Cox Stevens. After outgrowing its cramped quarters, the club moved to the McFarlane–Bredt House in Staten Island, then to Madison Avenue in Manhattan. The Hoboken clubhouse itself was physically relocated to Glen Cove, New York and then to Mystic, Connecticut, where it remained for 50 years before being relocated to Newport, Rhode Island in December 1999.

=== Main Clubhouse New York City ===
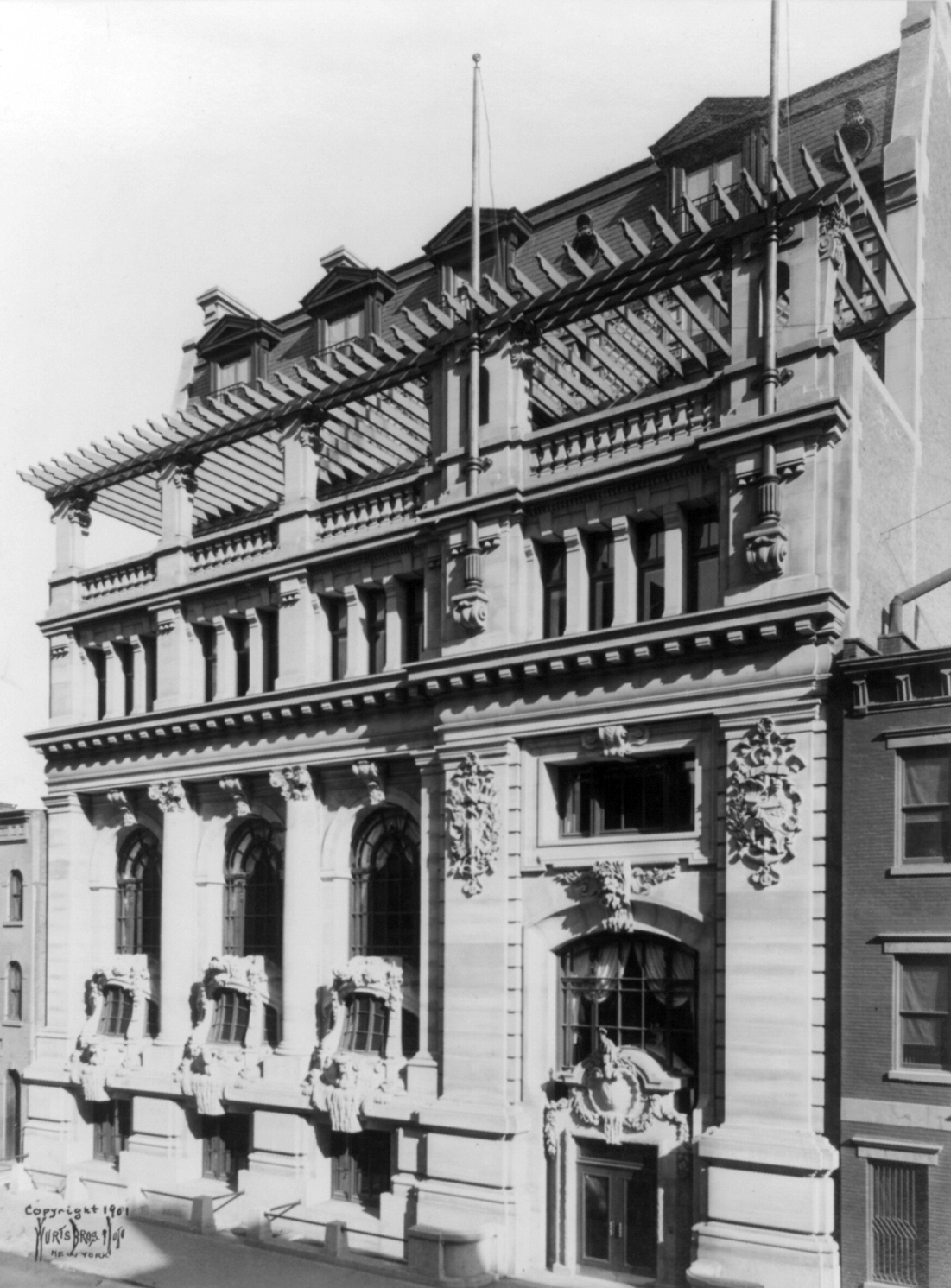
New York Yacht Club Building, 1901

The present primary clubhouse is the New York Yacht Club Building, a six-storied Beaux-Arts landmark with a nautical-themed limestone facade, at 37 West 44th Street in Midtown Manhattan. Opened in 1901, the clubhouse was designed by Warren and Wetmore (1898), who later helped design Grand Central Terminal. The centerpiece of the clubhouse is the "Model Room", which contains a notable collection of full and half hull models including a scale model history of all New York Yacht Club America's Cup challenges. It was designated a National Historic Landmark in 1987.

As Penn Club of New York (est. 1901) became the first alumni clubhouse to join Clubhouse Row for inter-club events at 30 West 44th Street after Harvard Club of New York City (est. 1888) at 27 West 44th, New York Yacht Club (est. 1899) became the first non-alumni clubhouse to join at 37 West 44th, then Yale Club of New York City (est. 1915) on East 44th (and Vanderbilt) and Cornell Club of New York (est. 1989) at 6 East 44th on the same block, with Princeton Club of New York joining in 1963 at 15 West 43rd (the only alumni clubhouse who wasn't on 44th Street, whose members, part of the staff, and in-residence club, Williams College Club of New York were absorbed into Penn Club following a previous visiting reciprocity agreement between the Princeton-Penn Clubs, before Princeton's went out of business during COVID). Despite being in New York City, Columbia University Club of New York (est. 1901) left Princeton after residence agreement issues to become in-residence at The Penn Club, while Dartmouth shares the Yale Club, and Brown shares the Cornell Club.

=== Harbour Court, Newport Rhode Island ===
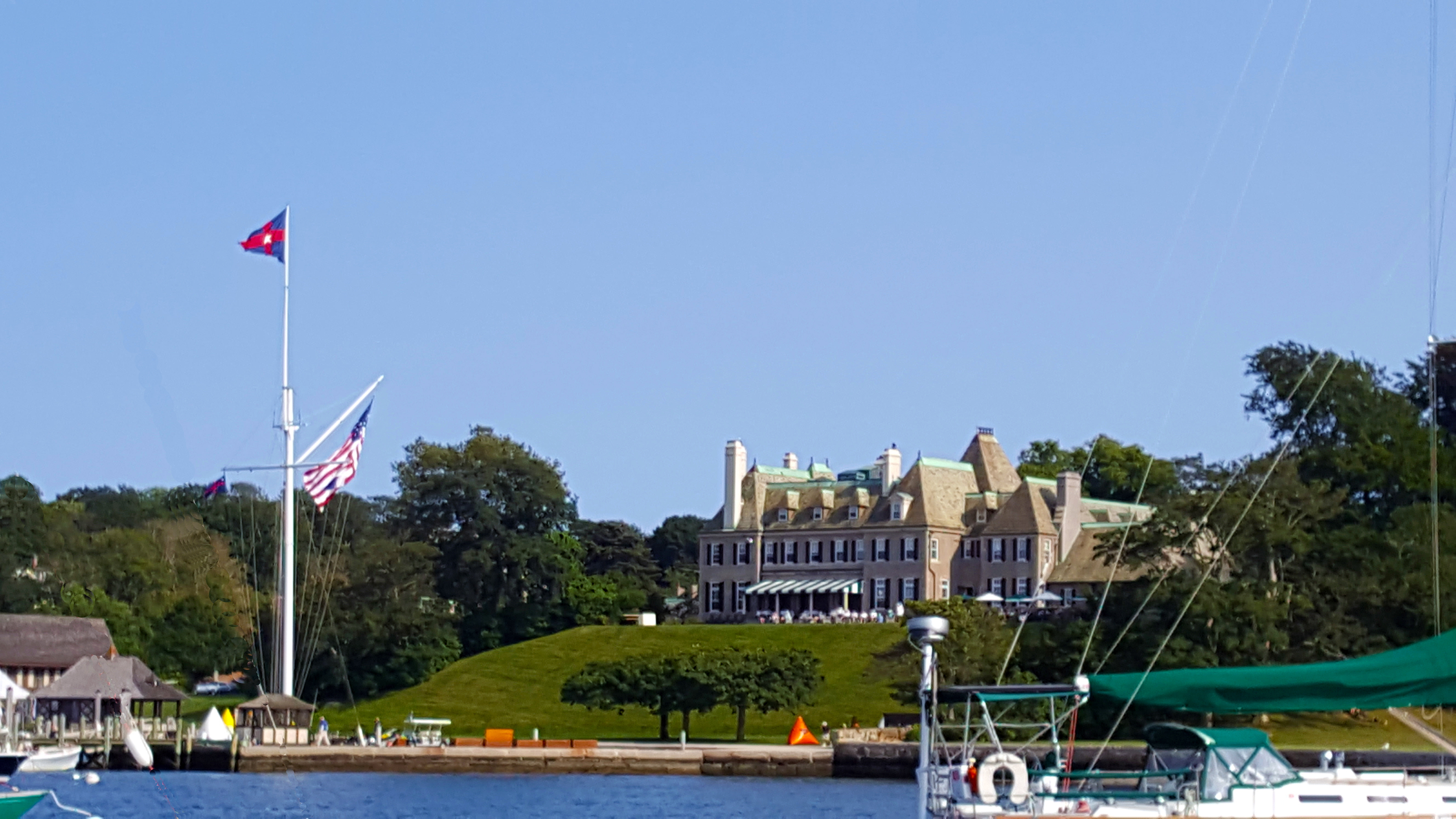
Harbour Court – New York Yacht Club

To better host regattas, in 1988, the club purchased an impressive water front property in Newport, Rhode Island.

== History ==
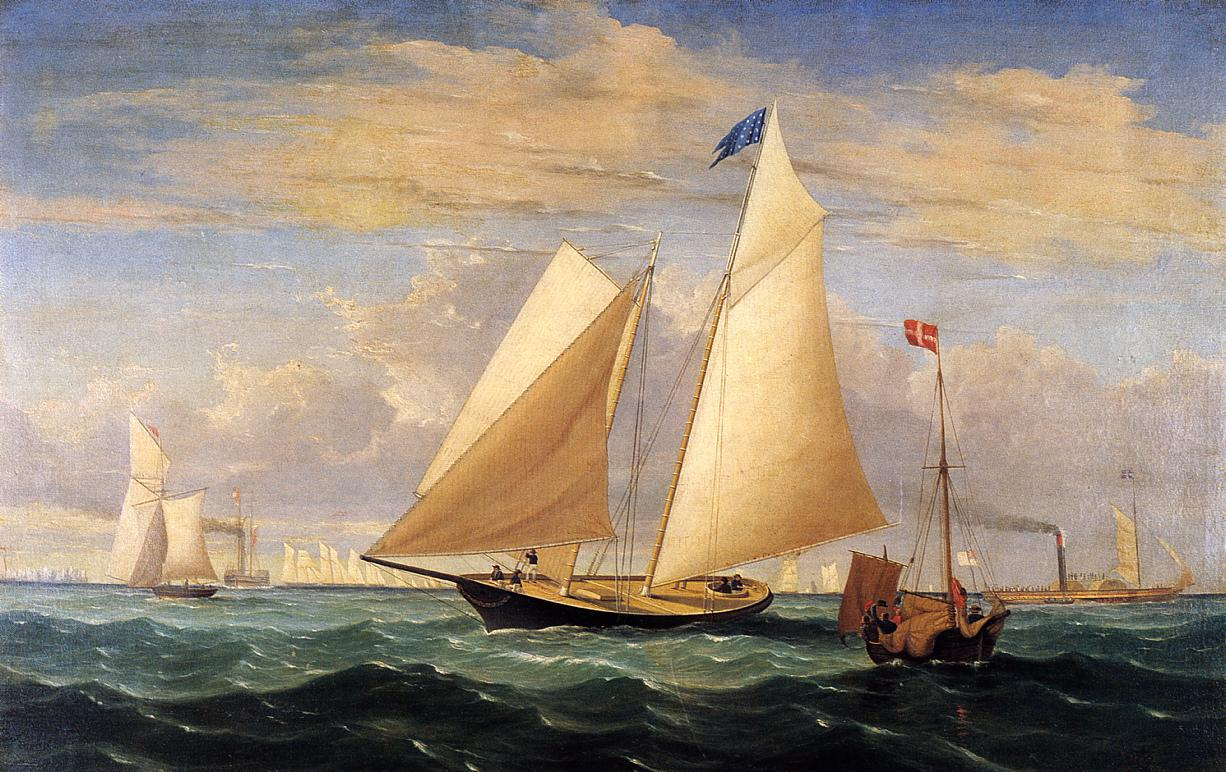
The Yacht 'America' Winning the International Race, 1851, Fitz Henry Lane

The New York Yacht Club was founded on July 30, 1844, by nine gentlemen. John Cox Stevens, the leader of this group, and a prominent citizen of New York with a passion for sports, was elected commodore. John Clarkson Jay of Rye, one of the nine founders, was a grandson of Founding Father John Jay and served as the first Secretary of the board. George L. Schuyler and Hamilton Wilkes were also NYYC founders who, together with Stevens and two others, created the syndicate that built and raced the great schooner-yacht, America. Wilkes served as the club's first vice-commodore. Schuyler played a key role in the founding of the America's Cup regatta, and served as its unofficial consultant until his death in 1890.

In 1845, the club's burgee was designed. The waters off Newport have been a key sailing venue for the NYYC since the beginning of its history. Indeed, the day the club was founded in 1844, its members resolved to sail from the Battery to Newport. Two days later, they did, with several stops on the way, and trials of speed.

During the first decades of the club's history, racing for prize money was the objective among most members. In 1851, a syndicate of NYYC enthusiasts built and raced America, capturing the "One Hundred Sovereign Cup" at the annual regatta of the Royal Yacht Squadron. On July 8, 1857, the coveted trophy was donated to the NYYC, to serve as a challenge cup for sportsmanlike competition between nations. The "America's Cup Race", named for its first winner, played a central role in the history of the club until this day.

In 1865, the club was incorporated, adopting the Latin motto: "Nos agimur tumidis velis" – "We go with swelling sails" (adapted from the verse of the famous Roman poet Horace, "Non agimur tumidis uelis", "We do not go with swelling sails", in Epistles, 2, 2, 201). During this time, membership transitioned from the "old guard" to a new generation of yachtsmen, who built large schooner yachts captained by professionals. Marking this evolution was the 1866 resignation of Commodore Edwin Augustus Stevens, brother of founder John Cox Stevens and member of the America syndicate.

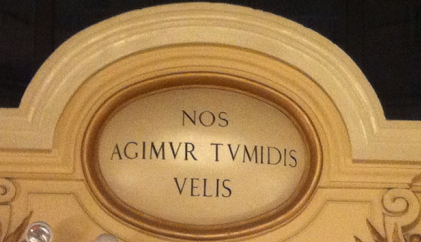
"New York Yacht Club motto - Nos Agimur Tumidis Velis"

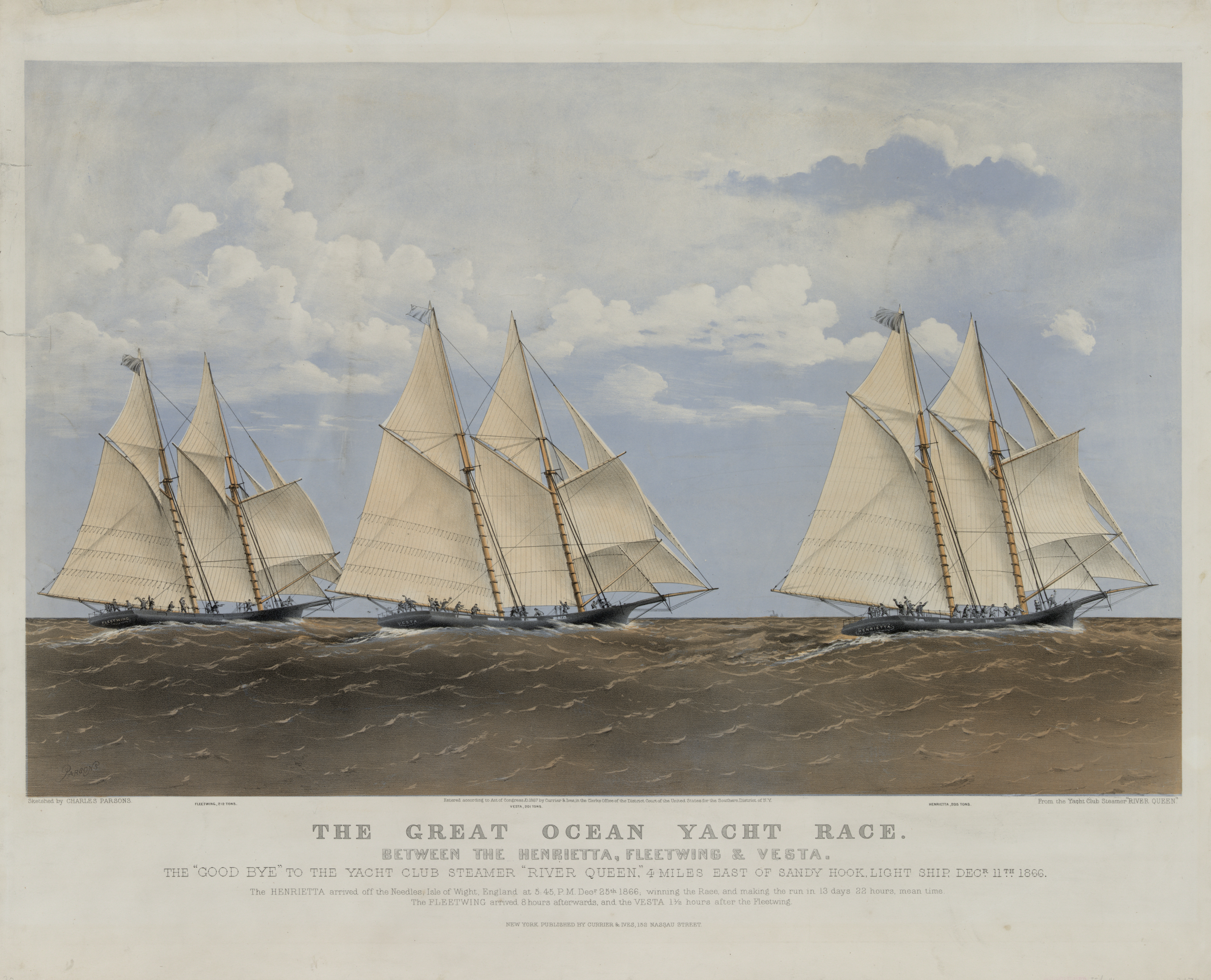
The Great Ocean Yacht Race Between Henrietta, Fleetwing & Vesta, by Currier & Ives in 1867

The year 1866 is remembered in club annals for the legendary "Transatlantic Race". In December, the NYYC schooners Henrietta, Fleetwing, and Vesta raced from Sandy Hook to The Needles, Isle of Wight for a $90,000 winner-take-all prize. The Henrietta, owned by 21-year-old James Gordon Bennett Jr., and skippered by Captain Samuel S. Samuels, won the race in 13 days, 21 hours and 55 minutes. Bennett would be elected commodore in 1871.

On August 8, 1870, the schooner Magic represented the New York Yacht Club in the international 1870 America's Cup competition in the New York Harbor and was won by Franklin Osgood's American yacht Magic. She beat 17 competitors, including the English yacht Cambria and the yachts Dauntless, Idler, Fleetwing, Phantom, America and others.

In 1876, the Mohawk, a large centerboard schooner, capsized due to its sheets being "made fast" (fastened securely) when a freak squall struck. Vice-Commodore William T. Garner, his wife and crew died in the accident. It is believed that this tragedy led to the extinction of the great centerboard schooner yachts. The Mohawk was later sold to the U.S. Navy and recommissioned as the USS Eagre.

In 1895, Richard H. Barker composed 'The yacht club march: march and two-step: for piano' in honor of the New York Yacht Club.

In 1994, as part of the club's 150th anniversary celebrations, Melissa H. Harrington wrote the book The New York Yacht Club, 1844–1994.

=== New York Yacht Club Stations c. 1894 ===
By 1894, the New York Yacht Club had a number of Clubhouses: Station 1 in Bay Ridge; 2 in New York NY; 3 in Whitestone NY; 4 in New London, Connecticut; 5 in Shelter Island, New York; 6 in Newport RI; 7 in Vineyard Haven and at Rendezvous Glen Cove. In 1868, the club bought a big mansion used as Station 2 at Rosebank, Staten Island. This building still stands and is known as the McFarlane–Bredt House.

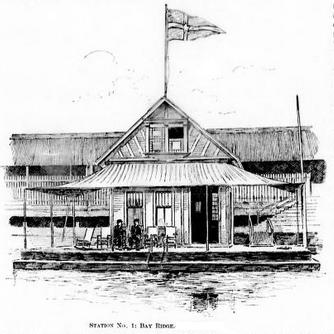
Clubhouse "Station No. 1" of the New York Yacht Club c. 1894 at Bay Ridge

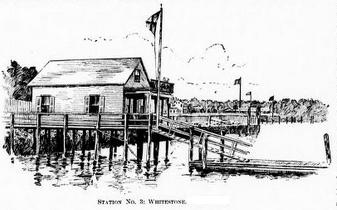
Clubhouse "Station No. 3" of the New York Yacht Club c. 1894 at Whitestone, NY

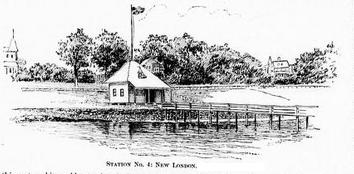
Clubhouse "Station No. 4" of the New York Yacht Club c. 1894 at New London, Conn

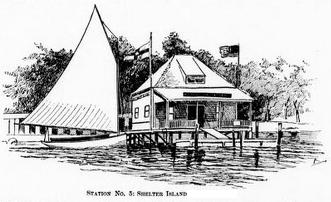
Clubhouse "Station No. 5" of the New York Yacht Club c. 1894 at Shelter Island, NY

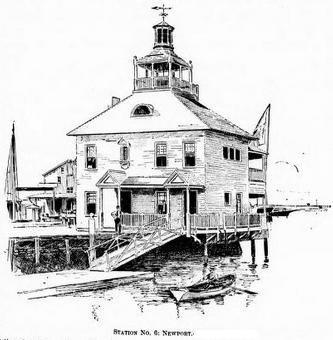
Clubhouse "Station No. 6" of the New York Yacht Club c. 1890s at Newport, RI

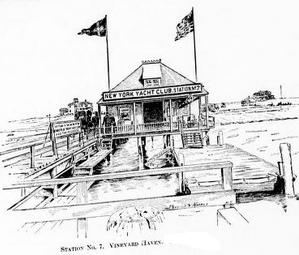
Clubhouse "Station No. 7" of the New York Yacht Club c. 1894 at Vineyard Haven, Mass

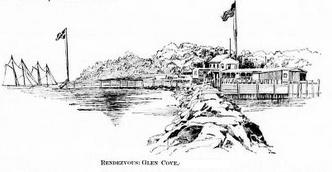
Clubhouse of the New York Yacht Club c. 1894 at Rendezvous Glen Cove

Former Commodore J. P. Morgan was present at a board meeting on 27 October 1898 to discuss the construction of a new clubhouse. Morgan offered to acquire a 75-by-100-foot (23 by 30 m) plot on 44th Street in midtown Manhattan if the NYYC raised its annual membership dues from $25 to $50 and if the new clubhouse occupied the entire site. The board accepted his offer, and Morgan bought the lots the next day for $148,000 and donated to the club.

Members hosted an informal housewarming party on 29 January 1901 and gave Morgan a trophy in gratitude of his purchase of the site.

== Racing and the America's Cup ==
The Club's racing culture is strong enough and members wealthy enough to support custom the design and construction of several racing sail yachts over the years. Sailboat design for club fleets

- New York 30 - Designed & built by NG Herreshoff in 1904 - 18 launched
- New York 50 - Designed & built by NG Herreshoff in 1912 - One survives of 9 built
- NYYC 48 - First built in 1976
- New York 36 - First built in 1980
- NYYC 42 - First built in 2005

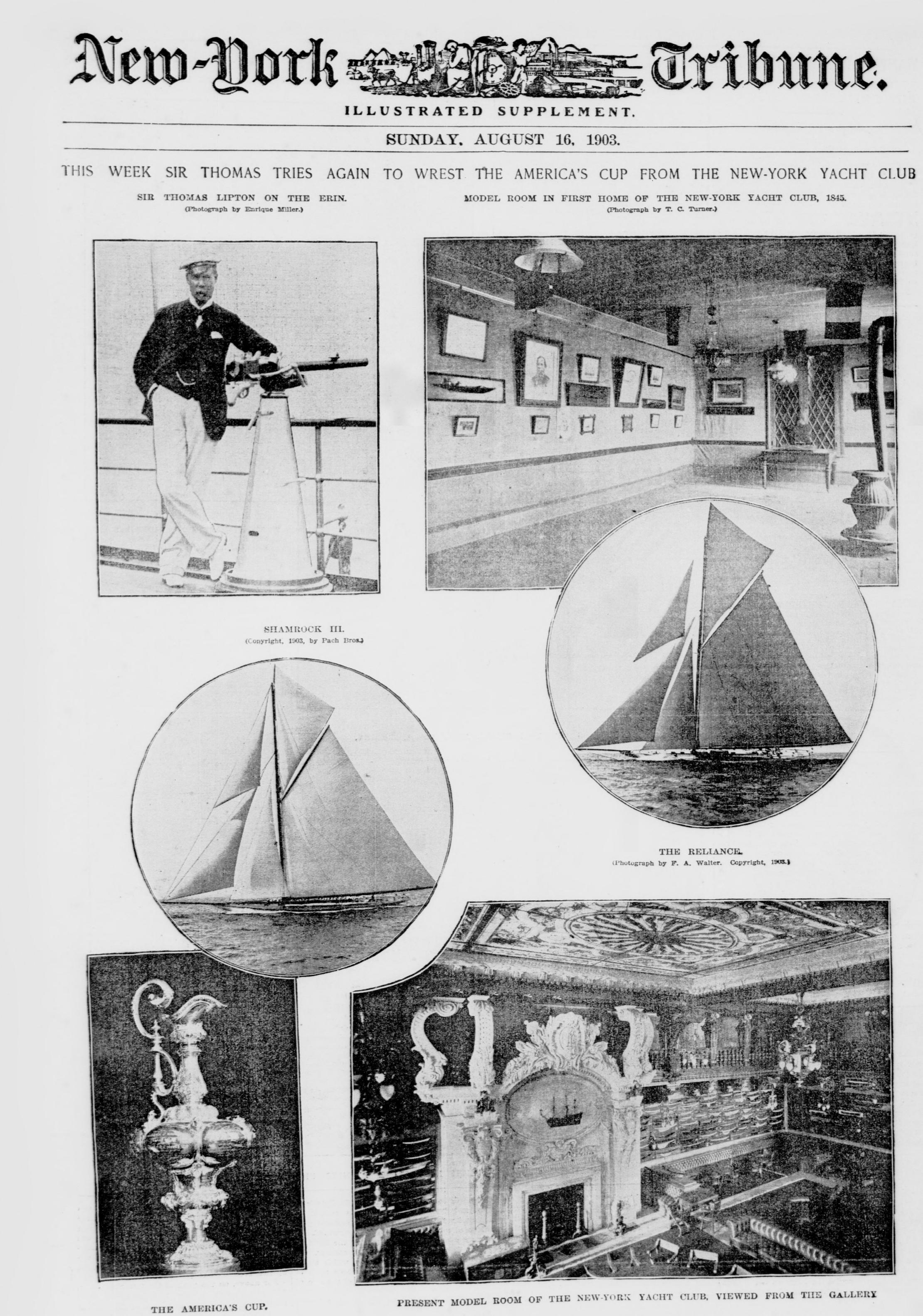
The America's Cup featured in the New-York Tribune in 1903.

Following the disastrous Bay of Quinte America's Cup challenge in 1881, the club's committee voted a new rule to govern its races:

$$\text{Rating}=\frac{2 \cdot \text{Load Waterline Length}+ \sqrt{\text{Sail Area}}}{3}$$

The America's Cup challenges of 1885, 1886 and 1887 used this rule with an 85 ft (25.91 m) waterline length limit. In 1887, the NYYC adopted the Seawanhaka Corinthian Yacht Club's rating rule, which handicapped length comparatively less. Then, in 1903, the NYYC changed its rating system to the "Herreshoff Rule", devised by the yacht designer, Nathanael Herreshoff. Later renamed the "Universal Rule", it would be adopted by the majority of leading American yacht clubs. The rule governed yacht design for almost forty years.

The America's Cup was held for 132 years, from 1851 until Australia II defeated Dennis Conner's Liberty off Newport, Rhode Island in 1983. This record remains the longest winning streak in sports history.

Since the loss of the Cup the NYYC has been forced to reinvent itself and the club has become involved in team racing, dinghy racing, youth sailing, and international regattas. In 2002 the Club hosted the Intercollegiate Sailing Association Sloop North American Championships. In 2006 the Club hosted the Blind Sailing World Championships.

The NYYC entered 2021 America's Cup represented by the American Magic team, led by Terry Hutchinson and Bella Mente Quantum Racing Association. In May 2018, it was announced that Dean Barker will helm the boat. "American Magic" references the first Cup winner, the yacht America, and the first defender, the yacht Magic.

== Regattas ==
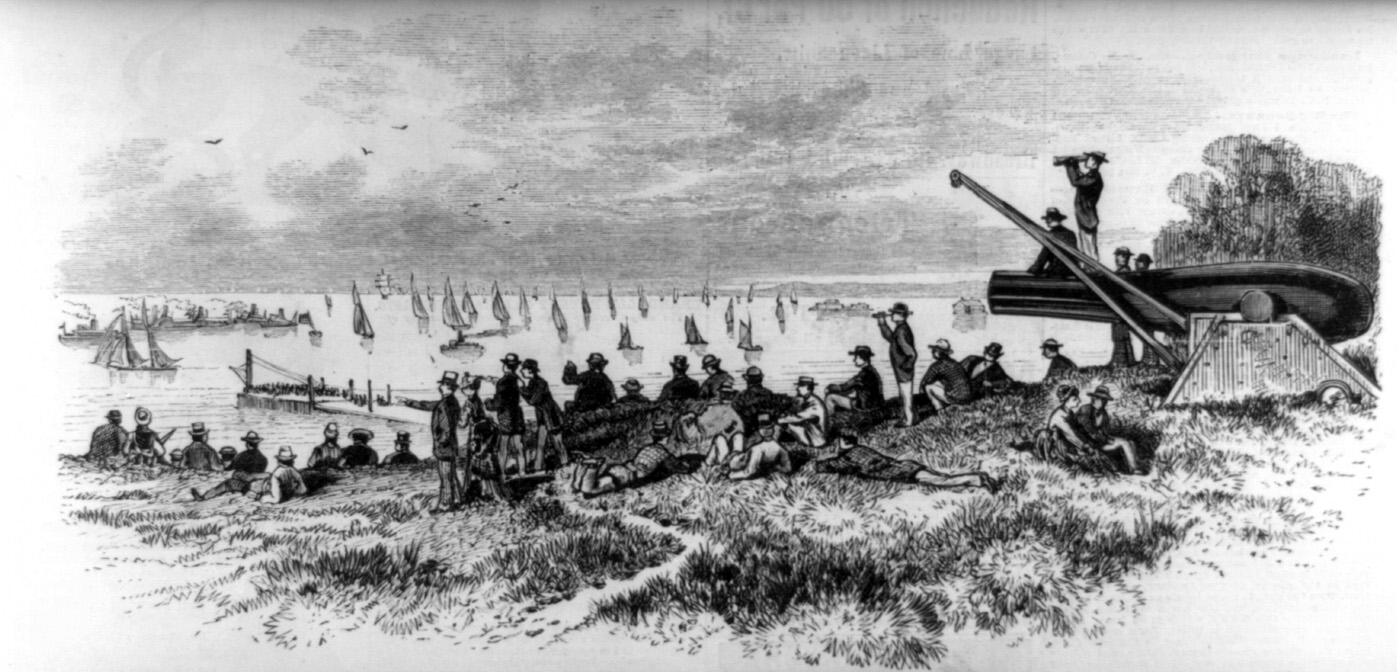
Engraving of spectators watching the annual regatta, late 19th century

- "Annual Regatta", started in 1846
- NYYC Invitational Cup
- 2005 Rolex Transatlantic Challenge
- "New York Yacht Club Cruise", an annual series of races held in July or August
- "Queen's Cup Trophy"
- "Una Cup"
- "Corsair Cup"
- "Astor Cups"
- "Solution Trophy"

The club has held a number of World Championships including J/70 World Championship, Melges 20 World Championship, Melges 32 World Championship, Etchells World Championship, Farr 40 World Championship, TP52 World Championship, 12-metre Worlds and the ORC World Championship,

== Notable members ==
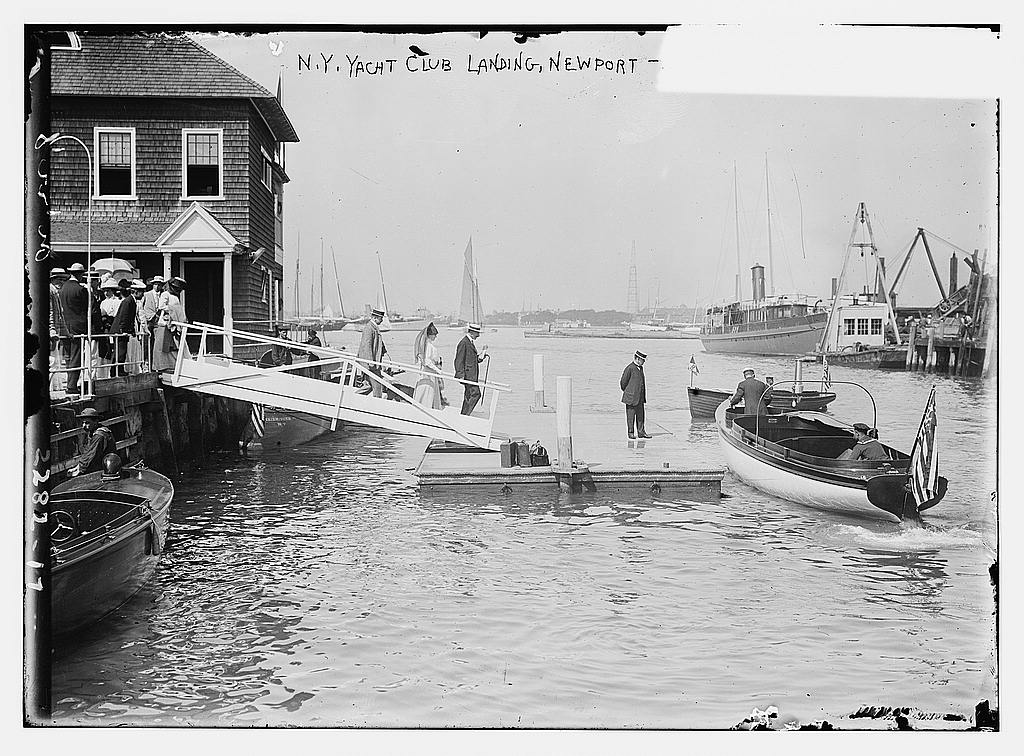
New York Yacht Club Landing in Newport c. 1910s

- Winthrop W. Aldrich
- Brooke Astor
- John Jacob Astor, real estate mogul
- Vincent Astor
- George Fisher Baker
- August Belmont
- James Gordon Bennett Jr., newspaper publisher
- Michael Bloomberg, Mayor of New York City
- John Nicholas Brown II, philanthropist
- Frederick Gilbert Bourne
- William F. Buckley, author and commentator
- William A. Chanler, explorer, soldier and US Congressman
- Robert H. Conn, Assistant Secretary of the Navy
- Dennis Conner, racing yacht captain
- William P. Cronan, 19th Naval Governor of Guam
- Walter Cronkite, newscaster
- Chris Dodd, United States senator
- Pete DuPont, governor of Delaware
- Elbridge Thomas Gerry
- Jay Gould, railroad tycoon
- James Alexander Hamilton, 3rd son of Alexander Hamilton, won first America's Cup in 1851
- Alfred Walton Hinds, 17th Naval Governor of Guam
- Charles Oliver Iselin
- Charles O'Neal, politician
- Arthur Curtiss James
- Gary Jobson
- Edward Kennedy Jr., son of United States Senator
- Dennis Kozlowski (resigned)
- Herbert F. Leary, Vice admiral in the Navy
- Lewis Cass Ledyard
- John Lehman, Secretary of the Navy
- Bernard Madoff (resigned)
- Clarence Moore, businessman
- J. P. Morgan, financier
- J. P. Morgan Jr.
- Junius Spencer Morgan III
- Emil Mosbacher
- Robert Mosbacher
- Franklin Osgood (1826–1888), served three terms as Rear-Commodore; member of first America's Cup Committee (1869)
- Frank F. Olney (1851–1903), 18th Mayor of Providence, Rhode Island
- Trenor Luther Park elected 1883, owned the Sultana
- Jonas M. Platt, major general in the Marine Corps
- Michael J. Quigley, Naval Intelligence Officer
- David Rockefeller, banker
- Franklin D. Roosevelt, 32nd President of the United States
- Gary Roughead, 29th Chief of Naval Operations, US Navy
- Arthur J. Santry, Jr. Chief Executive Officer, Combustion Engineering and Commodore NYYC
- Elliott Fitch Shepard, lawyer and newspaper owner
- Alfred P. Sloan
- George J. Smith, U.S. Congressman and cigar manufacturer
- John Cox Stevens
- Olin Stephens, yacht designer
- Ted Turner, media mogul
- Cornelius Vanderbilt III, Army general
- Harold Stirling Vanderbilt, railroad executive
- Thomas Watson Jr.

== See also ==
- NYYC Invitational Cup
- List of American gentlemen's clubs
- Sailboat design for club fleets
  - New York 50 - Designed & built by NG Herreshoff in 1912 - One survives of 9 built
  - NYYC 48 - First built in 1976
  - New York 36 - First built in 1980
  - Sonar (keelboat) - First built in 1980
  - NYYC 42 - First built in 2005
  - Melges IC37 - First built in 2017
- America's Cup title holders
  - Royal Perth Yacht Club, 1983–1987
  - San Diego Yacht Club, 1987–1995
  - Société Nautique de Genève, 2003–2010
  - Golden Gate Yacht Club, 2010–2017
  - Royal New Zealand Yacht Squadron; 1995–2003, 2017–present
