= NYYC Invitational Cup =

International inter club sailing event

- Sponsor: Rolex
- Host: New York Yacht Club

The Rolex New York Yacht Club Invitational Cup is a Corinthian international sailing event held between competing clubs. The event is organised by the New York Yacht Club and held in supplied one design boat from 2009 to 2019 this was the ClubSwan 42 and since then the Melges IC37.

Name	Nation	2009	2011	2013	2015	2017	2019	2021	2023	2025	2027
Boat		ClubSwan 42						Melges IC37			
American Yacht Club (New York)	United States							10			
Annapolis Yacht Club	United States		3								
Clube Naval de Cascais	Portugal		14								
Corinthian Yacht Club, Marblehead	United States								2	4	
Cruising Yacht Club of Australia	Australia		13	10							
Eastern Yacht Club	United States		4		3	3		8		10	
Howth Yacht Club	Ireland							18	12	12	
Itchenor Sailing Club	United Kingdom		18		8	9	13	17	18	17	
Japan Sailing Federation	Japan	3	6	6	5	7	8		14	13	
Larchmont Yacht Club	United States			2							
Middle Harbour Yacht Club	Australia				4						
New Bedford Yacht Club	United States					10					
New York Yacht Club	United States	1	2	9	2	4	6	5	4	9	
Newport Harbor Yacht Club	United States		5		9						
Norddeutscher Regatta Verein	Germany	15	15				14		17		
Noroton Yacht Club	United States							13	19		
Nyländska Jaktklubben	Finland	4	12	18				14			
Real Club Náutico de Barcelona	Spain	14	21	19	17		18				
Royal Yacht Club van België	Belgium			17							
Royal Bermuda Yacht Club	Bermuda	6	16					19			
Royal Canadian Yacht Club	Canada	2	1	1	10		4	6	10	7	
Royal Cape Yacht Club	South Africa		17								
Royal Cork Yacht Club	Ireland	5	8	4	7	11	3	4	13	5	
Royal Danish Yacht Club	Denmark	8									
Royal Freshwater Bay Yacht Club	Australia			16			17				
Royal Hong Kong Yacht Club	Hong Kong	11	9	15	11	6	16		5	2	
Royal Irish Yacht Club	Ireland									16	
Royal New Zealand Yacht Squadron	New Zealand	9					12		3		
Royal Norwegian Yacht Club	Norway		19								
Royal Ocean Racing Club	United Kingdom	10	7								
Royal Prince Alfred Yacht Club	Australia			11	13					14	
Royal Southern Yacht Club	United Kingdom			5							
Royal St. George Yacht Club	Ireland	12									
Royal Swedish Yacht Club	Sweden			20	15	12	10	11	6	6	
Royal Sydney Yacht Squadron	Australia					2	1		11		
Royal Thames Yacht Club	United Kingdom	13		3	1	5	7	2		8	
Royal Vancouver Yacht Club	Canada							12	9	3	
Royal Yacht Squadron	United Kingdom	16	11	12	12	14	19				
San Diego Yacht Club	United States						2	3	1	1	
San Francisco Yacht Club	United States			13				9			
Seattle Yacht Club	United States			7	6						
Shelter Island Yacht Club	United States					13					
Southern Yacht Club	United States					1	5	1	16		
St. Francis Yacht Club	United States	7									
Yacht Club Argentino	Argentina		10	8	16	8	15	15	7	20	
Yacht Club Capri	Italy		20								
Yacht Club Costa Smeralda	Italy	19					11	7	8	11	
Yacht Club de France	France	17					20				
Yacht Club de Ilhabela	Brazil									19	
Yacht Club Italiano	Italy	18		14	14		9	16		15	
Yacht Club Punta Ala	Italy		22								
Yacht Club Punta del Este	Uruguay								15	18	
Total (52 Clubs)	23 Nat	19	22	20	17	14	20	19	19	20	
