= New York 30 (disambiguation) =

NY30, NY-30, NY 30 or New York 30 may refer to:

- New York's 30th congressional district, a congressional district
- New York State Route 30, a state highway
- New York 30, a 1905 sailboat from N. G. Herreshoff
