= New York Yacht Club Building =

Clubhouse in Manhattan, New York

- New York Yacht Club
- U.S. National Register of Historic Places
- U.S. National Historic Landmark
- New York State Register of Historic Places
- New York City Landmark
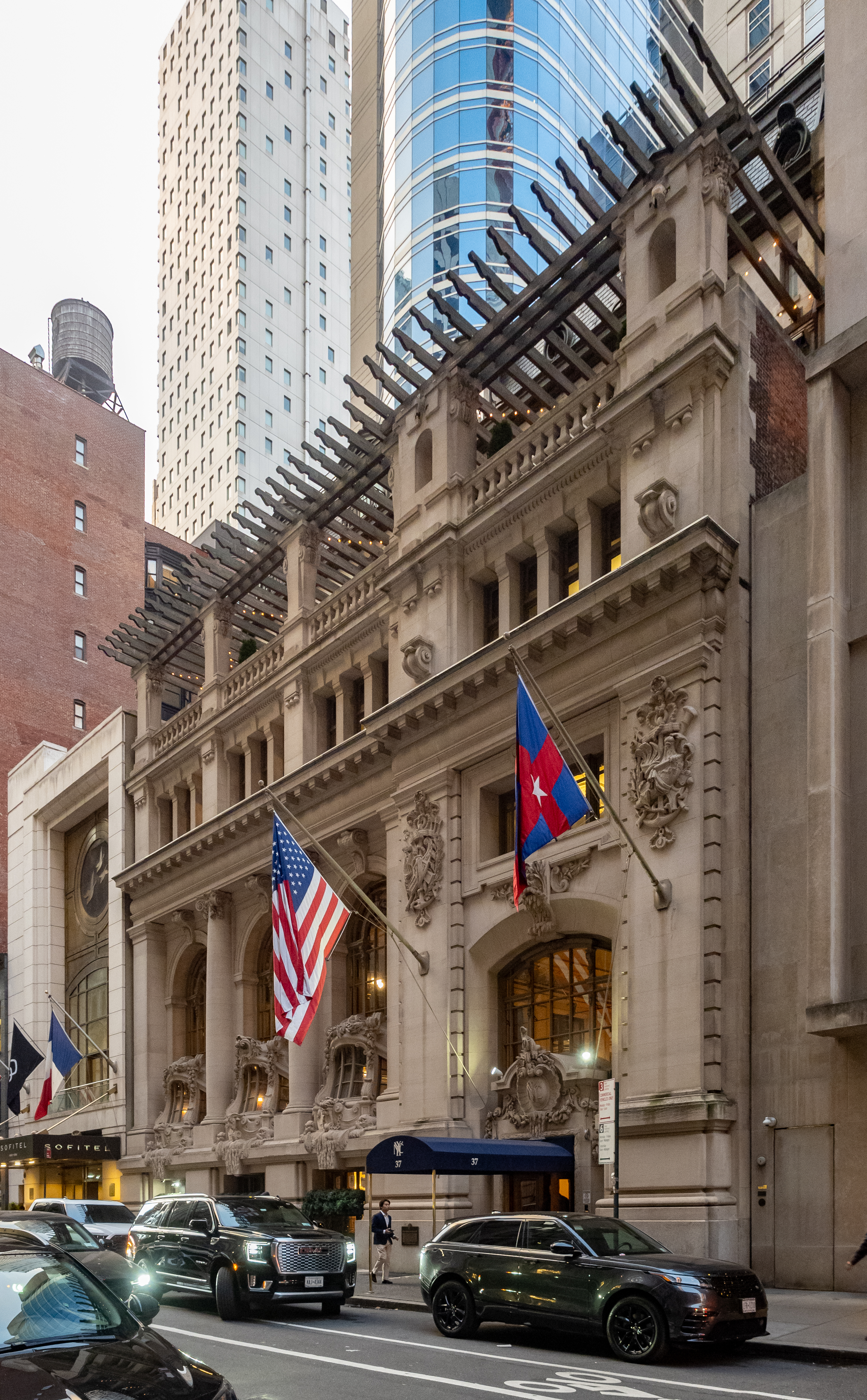
- Seen in 2024
- Interactive map of New York Yacht Club
- Location: 37 W. 44th St., Manhattan, New York, U.S.
- Coordinates: 40°45′20.5″N 73°58′53.8″W
- Area: 7,538 sq ft (700 m^{2})
- Built: 1901
- Architect: Whitney Warren; Warren & Wetmore
- Architectural style: Beaux Arts
- NRHP reference No.: 82001203
- NYSRHP No.: 06101.001757
- NYCL No.: 1019

Significant dates
- Added to NRHP: October 29, 1982
- Designated NHL: May 28, 1987
- Designated NYSRHP: September 17, 1982
- Designated NYCL: September 11, 1979

The New York Yacht Club Building is a seven-story Beaux-Arts clubhouse at 37 West 44th Street in the Midtown Manhattan neighborhood of New York City, United States. Opened in 1901, the building was designed by architect Whitney Warren of Warren and Wetmore as the sixth clubhouse of the New York Yacht Club (NYYC). The clubhouse is part of Clubhouse Row, a concentration of clubhouses on 44th Street between Fifth and Sixth avenues. The building is a New York City designated landmark and is listed on the National Register of Historic Places as a National Historic Landmark.

Many of the facade and interior decorations are maritime–themed. The building's ornately decorated facade, on 44th Street, is clad with stone on its first four stories and is asymmetrically divided into four bays. The easternmost bay contains the entrance, while the western three bays contain double-height arches, ornamented with bay windows that resemble the sterns of ships. The upper stories are within a mansard roof that is slightly set back. Inside is a double-height entrance hall, visitors' room, and various other spaces in the basement and at ground level. On the second story is a double-height model room, measuring 45 by 100 feet (14 by 30 m) and containing over a thousand ship models. A private library/chartroom, dining rooms, and offices occupy the fourth story, and there are bedrooms on the remaining floors.

The NYYC, founded in 1844, was known for holding the America's Cup yachting trophy for much of the 19th and 20th centuries. By the 1890s, overcrowding at the club's previous headquarters prompted the NYYC to consider developing a new clubhouse. J. P. Morgan bought land for the new clubhouse on 44th Street in October 1898, and Warren & Wetmore won an architectural design competition for the building that December. The clubhouse formally opened on January 19, 1901, and has hosted the club's annual meetings and events since then. The clubhouse remained mostly unchanged during the 20th century, although some rooms were converted to different uses. The NYYC renovated the interior in the 1980s and restored the facade in 1992. The interior was renovated again for the clubhouse's centennial in 2001.

== Site ==
The New York Yacht Club Building is on 37 West 44th Street, on the north sidewalk between Sixth Avenue and Fifth Avenue, in the Midtown Manhattan neighborhood of New York City. The rectangular land lot covers 7,538 ft^{2} (700.3 m^{2}), with a frontage of 75 ft (23 m) on 44th Street and a depth of 100.42 ft (31 m). The site, which is the clubhouse for the New York Yacht Club (NYYC), is landlocked.

On the same block, the Algonquin, Iroquois, and Sofitel New York hotels are to the west, while the Harvard Club of New York City building is to the east. Other nearby buildings include the Belasco Theatre to the west; Americas Tower to the northwest; 1166 Avenue of the Americas to the north; the New York City Bar Association Building and the Royalton Hotel to the south; and the Penn Club of New York Building, General Society of Mechanics and Tradesmen, and Hotel Mansfield to the southeast.

The adjacent block of 44th Street is known as Club Row and contains several clubhouses. When the New York Yacht Club Building was developed at the end of the 19th century, several other clubhouses were being built in the area. By the early 1900s, these other clubs included the Harvard Club, Yale Club, New York City Bar Association, Century Association, and the City Club of New York, all of which remained in the area at the end of the 20th century. Prior to the development of the Yacht Club Building, the neighborhood contained a slaughterhouse, stables for stagecoach horses, and a train yard for the elevated Sixth Avenue Line. There had been many stagecoach stables on 43rd and 44th streets between Fifth and Sixth avenues, but only a few of these buildings remained by the end of the 20th century.

== Architecture ==
The architectural firm of Warren and Wetmore designed the New York Yacht Club Building, which was completed in 1901. The club was known for the America's Cup yachting trophy, which it held from 1857 to 1983. The building is designed in a Beaux-Arts style, though characterized by contemporary newspapers as being "modern Renaissance of the French school". The clubhouse was the first of many buildings that the firm designed in New York City; the firm later designed such structures as Grand Central Terminal and the New York Central Building. Whitney Warren, one of the partners at Warren & Wetmore, wrote of his firm's design: "We consider that externally and internally the arrangements should be such as to place the subject in evidence, and not to retire it and make the clubhouse appear as that of merely a social club." As such, it was elaborately decorated with marine and nautical motifs.

=== Facade ===
The building is seven stories tall; the uppermost stories are within a mansard roof. The building's facade is made of finely-grained limestone, behind which is a brick wall. Only the southern elevation of the facade, along 44th Street, is visible. As planned, the first four stories would have been clad with stone, and there would have been a brick facade above. The brick section of the facade, corresponding to the clubhouse's bedrooms, is set back from the street, and it would not have been visible from the opposite sidewalk. This was to reduce the cost of construction, since brick was less expensive than limestone. As constructed, the first four stories extend to the lot line along 44th Street, while the mansard roof is set back approximately 15 feet (4.6 m) from the lot line. The lower stories are divided vertically into four bays and are asymmetrical. Warren had deliberately designed an asymmetrical facade to maximize the size of the second-floor model room. The facade's asymmetry and sculpted details were intended to make the building appear larger than it actually was.

The first story is treated as a podium and contains windows with grilles. On the second and third stories, the westernmost three bays are placed within a small colonnade, which consists of a Doric-style pier at either end and two Ionic-style engaged columns in the center. Each of the westernmost three bays contains a double-height, round-arched window. There is a bay window in the lower part of each archway, which is surrounded by an ornate frame. These frames are patterned after the sterns of 18th-century men-of-war, variously described as Baroque boats, Dutch yachts, and Spanish galleons. According to yachting historian and longtime NYYC member John Rousmaniere, the shapes of the frames most closely resemble a Dutch yacht. These frames also contain carvings of seaweed, waves, and garlands, which hang from console brackets below the center of each bay window, as well as dolphins on either side of the console bracket. The original plans had called for torchères to be installed along the facade, but this was never carried out.

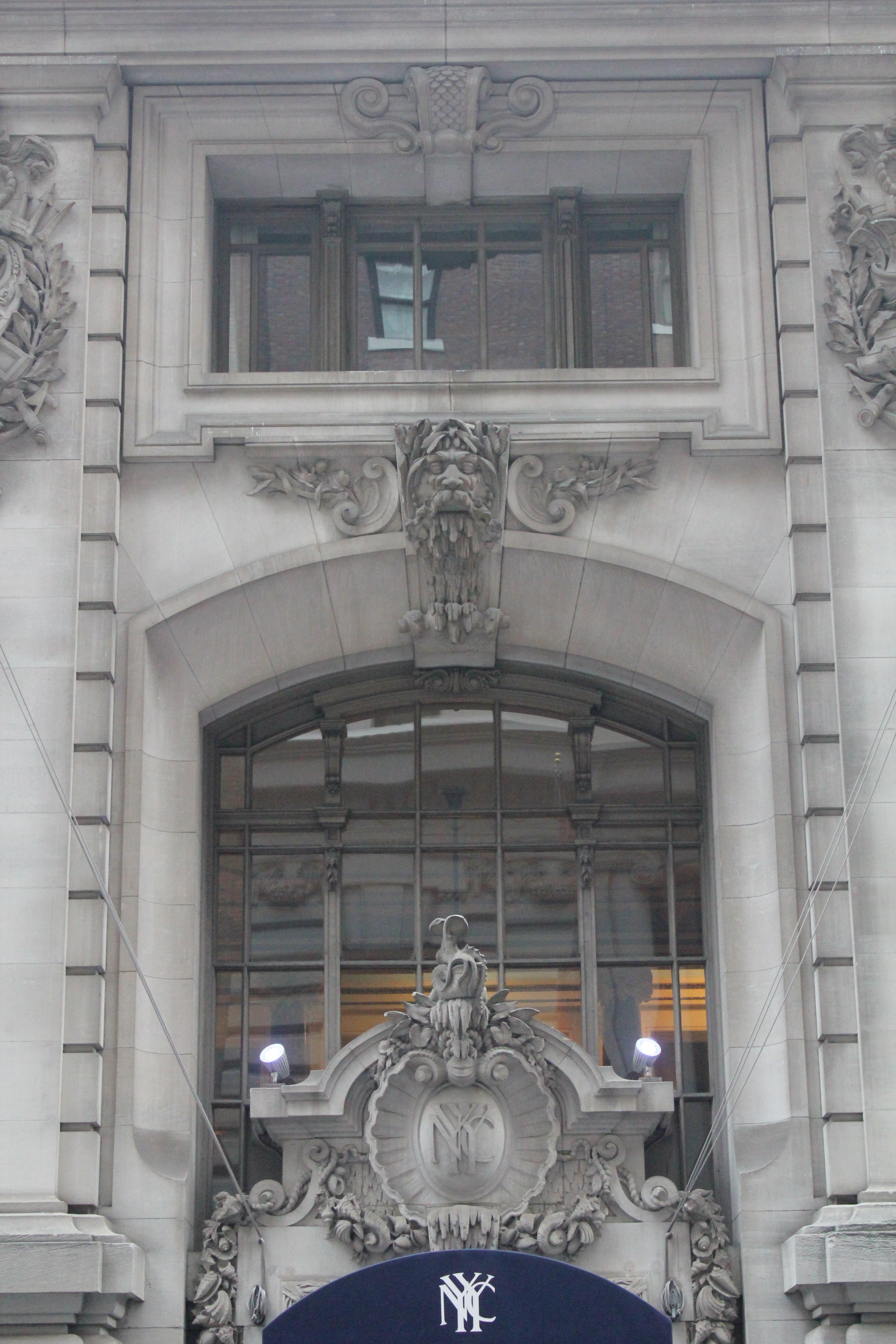
Second- and third-story windows above the main entrance

The easternmost bay projects slightly from the rest of the facade and is flanked by triple-height pilasters, each of which contains a carving of the NYYC's shield. At ground level is an entrance topped by a carved cartouche, which depicts a sea shell topped by an octopus with curved tentacles. There is a segmentally-arched window at the second story, which is divided into multiple panes. The arch is topped by a keystone with the head of Poseidon, the ancient Greek god of the sea. Flagpoles are affixed to either pilaster above the second story, projecting diagonally above the sidewalk. The easternmost bay contains a rectangular transom window at the third story, which is recessed from the facade.

Above the third story, an entablature with modillions runs horizontally across the entire facade. The upper stories are also divided into four bays, with broad pilasters between each bay. The fourth story contains small, recessed rectangular windows flanked by smaller piers. Above the fourth story, the broad pilasters between each bay are designed as freestanding piers, which support a pergola above the fifth story. A balustrade runs between each set of piers above the fifth story. There was originally a roof garden on the fifth story, beneath this pergola. In the original plans, the pergola was to have contained plantings, which were never installed. The mansard roof is recessed from the facade and is pierced by multiple tiers of windows.

=== Features ===
Warren & Wetmore manufactured oak furniture and ornamental lighting fixtures for the New York Yacht Club Building. The interior was mostly upholstered in dark green leather. As with the facade, many of the decorations contain a maritime theme. The walls also contain maritime artwork from painters such as James E. Buttersworth. Most of the rooms were placed on different levels.

==== Lower stories ====
Immediately inside the main entrance, a short staircase ascends to a double-height entrance hall. This space contains Caen stone walls and a marble staircase in the center, leading to the model room on the second floor. Originally, the clerk's office was to the right (east) of the hall, while the visitors' room, coatroom, letterboxes, and telephones were to the left. The visitors' room was decorated with photographs of large yachts. All non-members were originally directed to the visitors' room, where they waited for a member to accompany them upstairs; this space was later converted into a reception desk. The coatroom was at the bottom of the grand staircase. On the opposite side of the entrance hall was a stair leading to the club's cafe.

On the left side of the entrance hall, next to the coatroom and behind the visitors' room, a narrow staircase descended a half-story to a grill room and billiards room. The grill room measured either 30 by 68 feet (9.1 by 20.7 m) or 35 by 75 feet (11 by 23 m) and was used as a dining room. The entire room was intended to resemble a ship. The oak decorations, including a low beamed ceiling and curved walls, were meant to evoke a ship's tweendecks. Unstained-oak benches, medieval-styled iron lamps on the ceiling, and clusters of electric lamps on the walls all further contributed to the ship-like ambiance of the grill room. There was a large fireplace on one wall, which was surrounded by a mantel with an oval panel. The grill room's "stern" faced south toward 44th Street and contained a relic of the Gimcrack, the ship on which the NYYC had been founded in 1845.

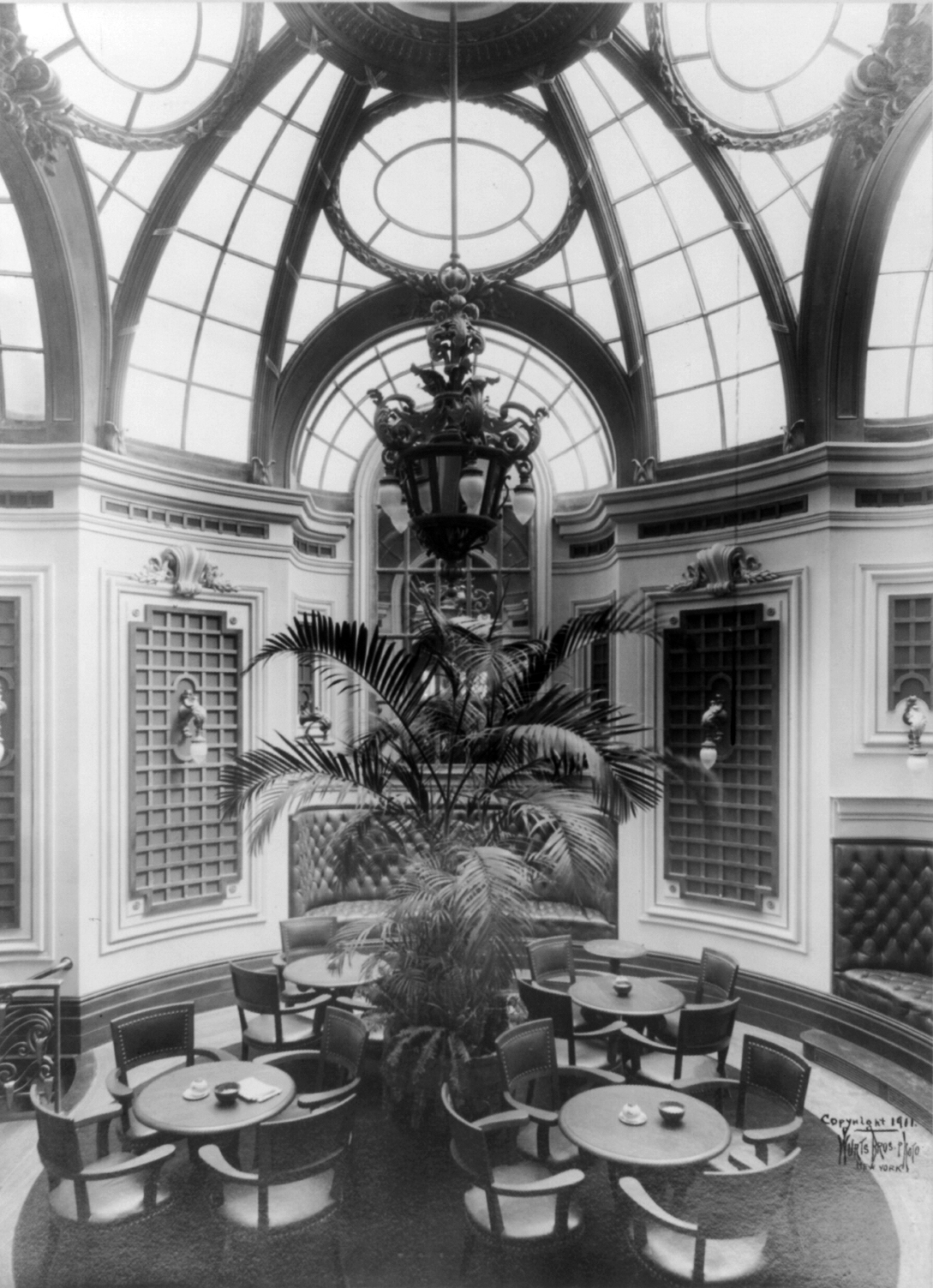
The New York Yacht Club Building's cafe

At the rear of the grill room were glass doors, which led to a billiards room with four billiards tables and another large fireplace. The billiards room was wainscoted in dark oak, and the walls above the wainscoting were covered with green burlap panels. When the billiards room was converted to a bar, the glass doors were replaced with a wall. Above the billiards room was a cafe. A curved double stair connected the cafe and billiards room. The cafe originally contained green leather furniture but was converted into a sailing-trophy room after World War II. The trophy room is circular in plan, measuring 25 feet (7.6 m) across, with a double-height domed ceiling. A bronze-and-gold chandelier hangs from the center of the dome. The walls of this room are made of Caen stone and originally contained mirrored glass panels, held into place by mullions. Another staircase leads up to the second-story landing of the clubhouse's main staircase.

The mechanical equipment and the culinary staff were placed in the basement. From the entrance hall, a passageway led to the kitchen, pantries, engine and boiler rooms, and cellars. The pantries originally had iceboxes lined with oak, although the iceboxes have been since changed into refrigerators.

==== Model room ====
The model room on the second story is a double-height space, which from the outset was intended as the clubhouse's most important room. Sources disagree on the exact dimensions, (Note: The following measurements have been cited: 43 by 97 feet (13 by 30 m); 45 by 96 feet (14 by 29 m); 46 by 95 feet (14 by 29 m)) but the room measures approximately 45 feet (14 m) wide and 100 feet (30 m) deep. The space is illuminated by the large windows on 44th Street. It is decorated in gold, green, and maroon. The room houses the NYYC's collection of ship models; in 2001, there were 150 full models and about 1,200 half-models. According to Town & Country, "some of the models are as expensive as some yachts". Some models are of America's Cup challengers and defenders. Other models depict ships that participated in regattas sponsored by the NYYC; before 1951, all regatta participants had to donate at least a half-model of their ships, and many owners chose to donate full models. Models were placed in chronological order based on when the ships were commissioned. The full models were displayed in glass cases at the center of the room, while the half-models were displayed along the walls.

The model room also contained awards and trophies, as well as other artifacts from club members. The artifacts include the tiller of the yacht America (namesake of the America's Cup), a NYYC burgee that Henry Morton Stanley carried during one of his expeditions to Africa, and a model boat carved out of bones. There was also an alcove known as the Palm Court, where the America's Cup trophy was displayed from the building's opening until 1983. The trophy was placed in a glass case atop a wooden table; the NYYC had installed a custom bolt in 1972 to secure the cup to the table.

The model room's floor is covered by a 64-by-19-foot (19.5 by 5.8 m) Indian rug, which was installed in 2000. The eastern wall of the model room contains four pairs of French doors, which lead to the grand staircase and the stair hall's balconies. The western wall, directly opposite the main stairway contains a fireplace and mantel made of Caen stone. This fireplace measures about 15 feet (5 m) wide and 25 feet (8 m) tall. Weighing over 40 short tons (36 long tons; 36 t) or 45 short tons (40 long tons; 41 t), the fireplace was so heavy that several brick piers had to be installed to support its weight. There is a sculpted panel above the center of the fireplace. The north, west, and east walls originally had dark oak paneling, above which was green burlap. There were benches next to the walls. On the south wall, there are niches next to each bay window, which contain green seats. At the center of the model room was a circular oak table measuring 12 feet (3.7 m) across.

There is a balcony at the third story, wrapping around the north, west, and east sides of the room. The balcony rests atop carved brackets and contains a balustrade with galleon motifs. The ceiling above the balcony is supported by oak columns, which are topped by capitals with shell and wave motifs. The balcony is interrupted by the oversized fireplace on the western wall and by the main staircase hall to the east. The original plans called for a circular stair between the model room's main floor and the balcony, but this stair was never built; the clubhouse's main staircase connects the model room and the balcony. At the center of the ceiling is a backlit skylight made of stained glass and placed 26 feet (7.9 m) above the main floor. The skylight is the only remaining Tiffany glass skylight in New York City that has not been relocated. It contains decorations of stars and is flanked by a pair of white panels. Three large chandeliers are suspended from the ceiling. The club's card room is at the same level as the model room's balcony. The card room contains dark-red burlap walls, upon which numerous portraits are hung.

==== Upper stories ====
The fourth story (Note: The fourth story is sometimes counted as the third floor, if the balcony above the model room is not counted as a full story.) is the highest story that is visible from the street. It contains a library and chartroom facing 44th Street, which collectively span the facade. The library and chartroom occupy the front section of the building, and the spaces measure either 35 by 75 feet (11 by 23 m) or 40 by 70 feet (12 by 21 m). The library itself measures 32 by 46 feet (9.8 by 14.0 m), and the chartroom measures 34 by 28 feet (10.4 by 8.5 m). The library featured rare old prints, lithographs, photographs, watercolors, and other objects relating to yachting. It could fit thousands of volumes; in 2001, the space had 13,000 volumes, which were stored in climate-controlled spaces. The library originally contained oak bookcases with glass doors, and it had a marquetry floor covered with red rugs. Also in the library is a large fireplace donated by James Gordon Bennett. Generally, access to the library is restricted to club members, although its visitors have also included historians, researchers, and lawyers.

At the rear of the clubhouse's fourth floor are the club's private dining rooms, two committee rooms, and the offices of the librarian, treasurer, and secretary. The rear wall is set back by about 11 feet, giving the dining room a private terrace that faces northward.

In the original plans, there were to be 20 bedrooms on the fourth through seventh floors. These rooms would have been illuminated by a light court in the center, as well as windows to the north and south. As built, there were 18 bedrooms on the fifth through seventh floors, within the mansard roof. The fifth story also contains a club room with French doors on its south wall, which open onto a balcony facing 44th Street. The balcony was originally paved in red stone and was covered with green trellises. The top floor was used as servants' quarters.

==== Staircases and elevator ====
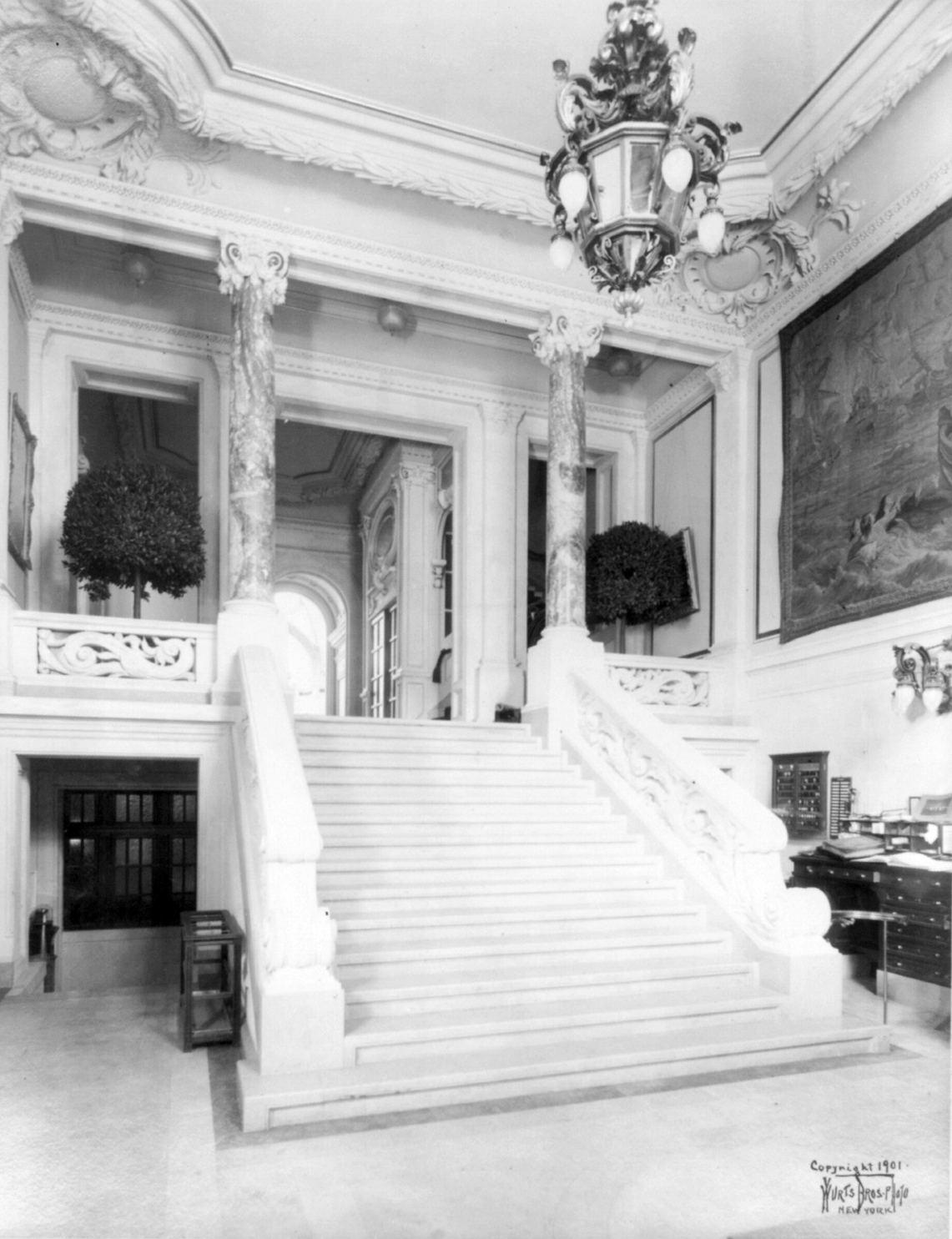
Main staircase

A grand staircase of Caen stone leads from the ground floor to the second story. Its balustrade is carved to resemble waves. The grand staircase's second-story landing contains two columns with marine-themed capitals. The second-story landing overlooks the former cafe. A French door to the left leads to the model room. Three additional French doors from the model room lead to balconies that overlook the staircase. Portraits of J. P. Morgan and John C. Stevens, two early NYYC commodores, were placed on the second-floor landing, just outside the model room. A narrow staircase connects the second story and the upper floors. Next to the staircase, an elevator also connects all of the floors.

== History ==
The NYYC was founded in 1844 and occupied five clubhouses before moving to 44th Street. The NYYC established its first clubhouse in 1845, holding its regattas near a promontory in Hoboken, New Jersey. The club's membership grew in the mid-19th century, and the club acquired the McFarlane–Bredt House in Clifton, Staten Island, in 1869 and relocated their regattas there. In 1871, the NYYC rented several rooms in a house at the intersection of 27th Street and Madison Avenue in Manhattan. The club relocated to Stapleton, Staten Island, and stayed there until 1877. The NYYC moved yet again to 67 Madison Avenue in 1884.

By the 1890s, many of New York City's social clubs were headquartered in converted residences, but increased membership forced several clubs, including the NYYC, to build clubhouses of their own. The NYYC's members began advocating for a new clubhouse. The club had 1,038 members in 1894, and membership elections and special events at 67 Madison Avenue were often standing-room only. In addition, the club had seven yacht "stations" across the East Coast of the United States, including a particularly elaborate station in Newport, Rhode Island.

=== Planning and construction ===
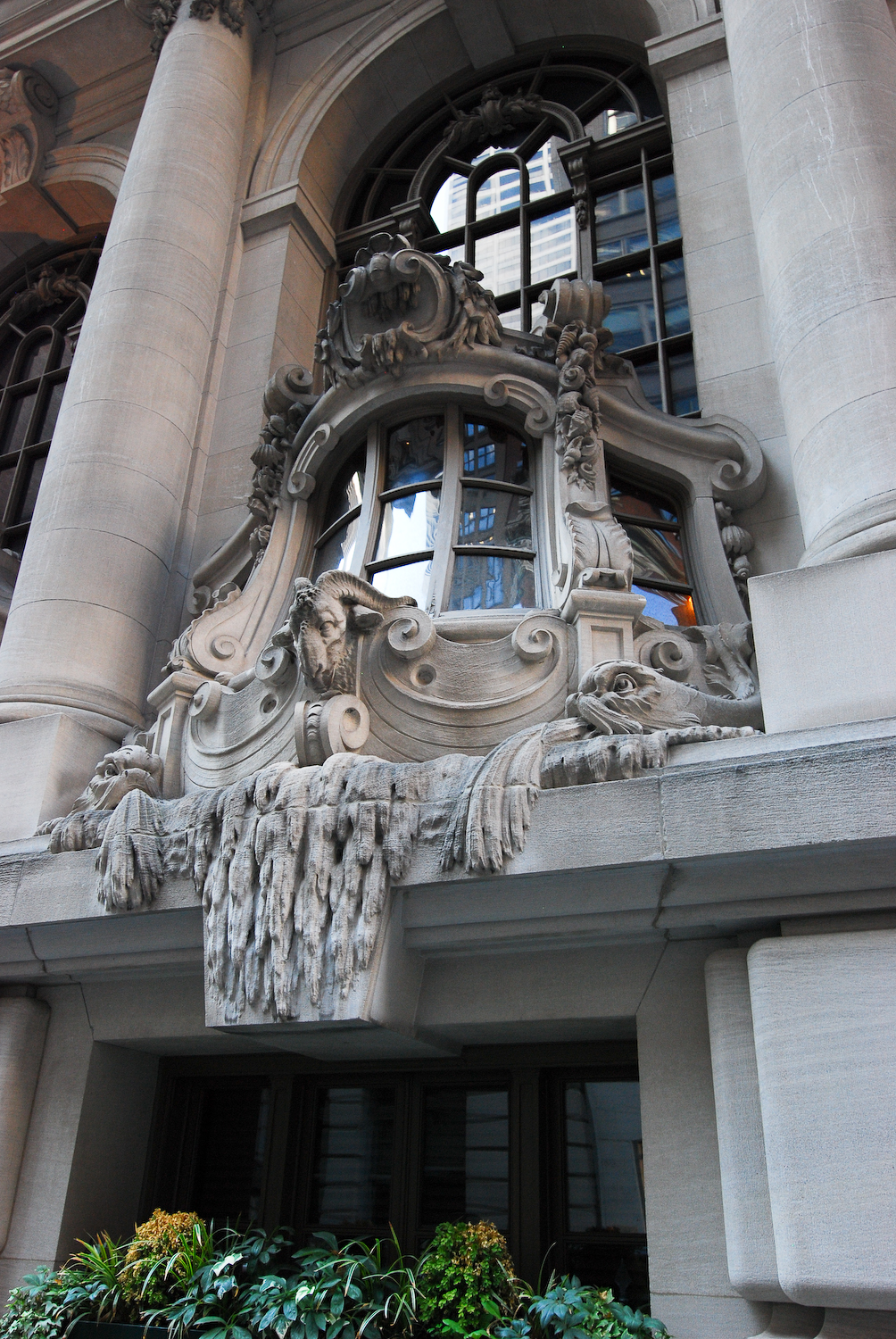
View of bay window on the clubhouse's facade

In October 1897, the NYYC's board voted to establish a five-person committee to select a site and raise money for a new clubhouse in New York City. The committee first convened in January 1898, even as the NYYC's members debated constructing the proposed clubhouse outside city limits. Other members opposed the idea of a new clubhouse entirely, instead wishing to maintain the club's existing stations. The committee eventually identified two potential sites for the clubhouse, but most NYYC members were noncommittal about either site.

At a board meeting on October 27, 1898, J. P. Morgan (the club's former commodore) offered to acquire the larger of the two sites, a 75-by-100-foot (23 by 30 m) plot on 44th Street in Midtown Manhattan. The site was composed of three separate lots at 37 to 41 West 44th Street. Morgan promised to buy the site immediately, but only if the NYYC raised its annual membership dues from $25 to $50 and if the new clubhouse occupied the entire site. The NYYC's board accepted his offer, and Morgan bought the lots the next day for $148,000. At the time, the building itself was projected to cost $200,000, and the NYYC's members had already pledged to donate $75,000 toward the clubhouse's construction.

The NYYC hosted an architectural design competition for the clubhouse in November 1898; each contestant had to submit a plan within one month. Each plan was to include a model room with space for 300 people, as well as a library that could fit 15,000 volumes. Seven architects entered the competition. The plans ranged from R. H. Robertson's relatively simple design, which The New York Times characterized as resembling "a small-town businessman's lunch club", to Howard, Cauldwell & Morgan's ornate French design, with three large windows. The NYYC hired Whitney Warren to design the clubhouse in December, rejecting a more conventional proposal from George A. Freeman. The consulting architect for the project had recommended two other designs, but Morgan had preferred Warren & Wetmore's design because of its French details. The club's secretary announced that construction of the clubhouse would begin immediately. Marc Eidlitz & Son was the general contractor. The architects displayed a model of the proposed 44th Street clubhouse at the NYYC's Madison Avenue headquarters in early 1899. The NYYC acquired the title to its new clubhouse from Morgan that November.

The New-York Tribune reported in September 1900 that the New York Yacht Club Building "lacked one story" and was nearly completed. By the following month, the members had subscribed $113,000 toward the construction of the clubhouse, which was scheduled to be completed that December. Although the building was still incomplete at the end of that year, the NYYC had begun relocating its books from its old Madison Avenue headquarters into the new 44th Street clubhouse. The NYYC held its final meeting at its Madison Avenue clubhouse on January 15, 1901; at the time, the club had 1,495 members. Members started moving to the 44th Street clubhouse four days later, on January 19, although the building was still incomplete. The structure's final cost was estimated at $350,000; including the land, the entire project had cost about $500,000. NYYC members hosted an informal housewarming party on January 29, 1901, giving Morgan a trophy in gratitude of his purchase of the site. Two days later, the all-male club held its first formal reception for female guests.

=== Early and mid-20th century ===
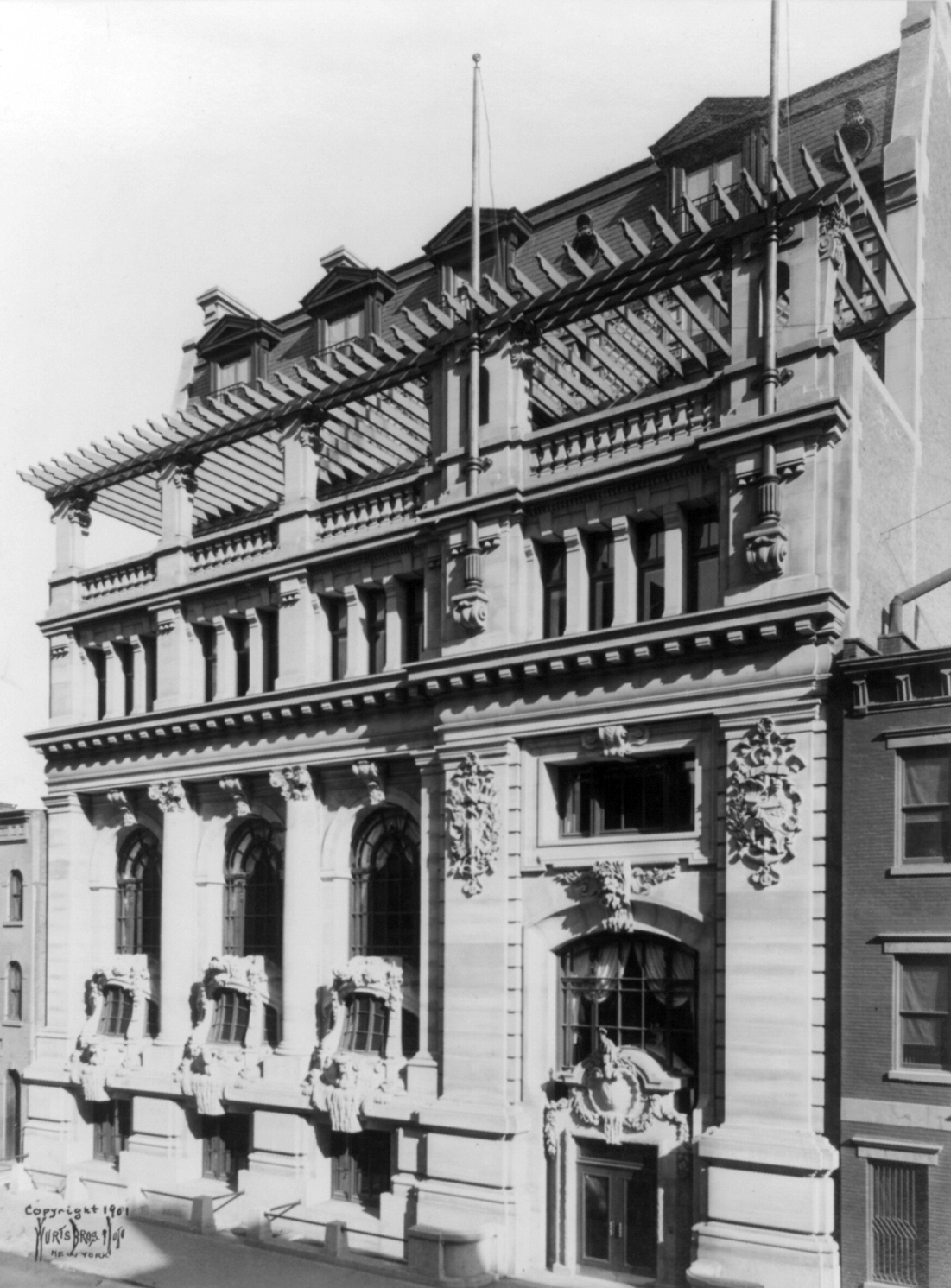
Seen in 1901, shortly after completion

The NYYC conducted its annual meetings in the model room, where it inducted new members, elected its commodore, scheduled competitions, and changed rules for its regattas. The New York Yacht Club Building also hosted events such as annual New Year's Eve dinners, where club members drank eggnog. At the club's 1902 annual meeting, the NYYC's secretary reported that the club "was in the best condition in its history". By the next year, the club had grown to 2,000 members; the club reached its maximum membership in 1907. The 44th Street clubhouse was known as the "city house". In addition to the 44th Street clubhouse, the NYYC had stations on the East River in Manhattan, as well as in Glen Cove, New York; Newport, Rhode Island; and various other locales in the northeastern United States. During the summer, the NYYC met in Glen Cove and Newport and held regattas there. The NYYC station in Glen Cove was actually the original Hoboken clubhouse, which had been relocated there in 1904, while the Newport station had been acquired in 1915 for use as a summer clubhouse.

The clubhouse's main entrance was slightly truncated in 1916, when the New York City government widened 44th Street. In 1928, the NYYC bought an adjacent three-story building at 35 West 44th Street from J.P. Morgan, Arthur Curtiss James, and Cornelius Vanderbilt III, thus protecting the building's natural light exposure. By the end of the decade, many of the area's clubs were relocating uptown, but the NYYC remained at its longtime headquarters on 44th Street. The clubhouse continued to be used for events such as annual meetings and informal dinners. Women were finally allowed into the clubhouse after the NYYC started accepting female members in 1936. Prior to this change, women could only enter the visitors' room, and no woman had visited the upper stories since 1901. The NYYC had several female associate members, who could use the Glen Cove, Newport, and East River stations but could not enter the 44th Street clubhouse. The club's membership was still predominantly male; women still could not visit the bar or eat lunch at the clubhouse. In the 1940s, the clubhouse's barbershop was closed and replaced with a women's restroom.

The NYYC sold off 35 West 44th Street in 1945, but it continued to operate out of 37 West 44th Street. After World War II, the cafe became a trophy room, and the billiards room became a bar when the clubhouse's original bar was converted to mailboxes. In 1955, the club filed alteration plans with the New York City Department of Buildings. At some point during the mid-20th century, the facade was painted gray, and the pergola and flagpoles on the facade were removed. The skylight began to leak, causing lead panels to fall onto the model room's floor, and was repaired. By the end of the 1950s, the number of social clubs in New York City had declined significantly, and the NYYC was one of the city's only yacht clubs. At the time, the city had about 30 social clubs, compared with the 100 clubs at the beginning of the 20th century. Even so, the New York Yacht Club Building remained prestigious.

=== Late 20th century to present ===
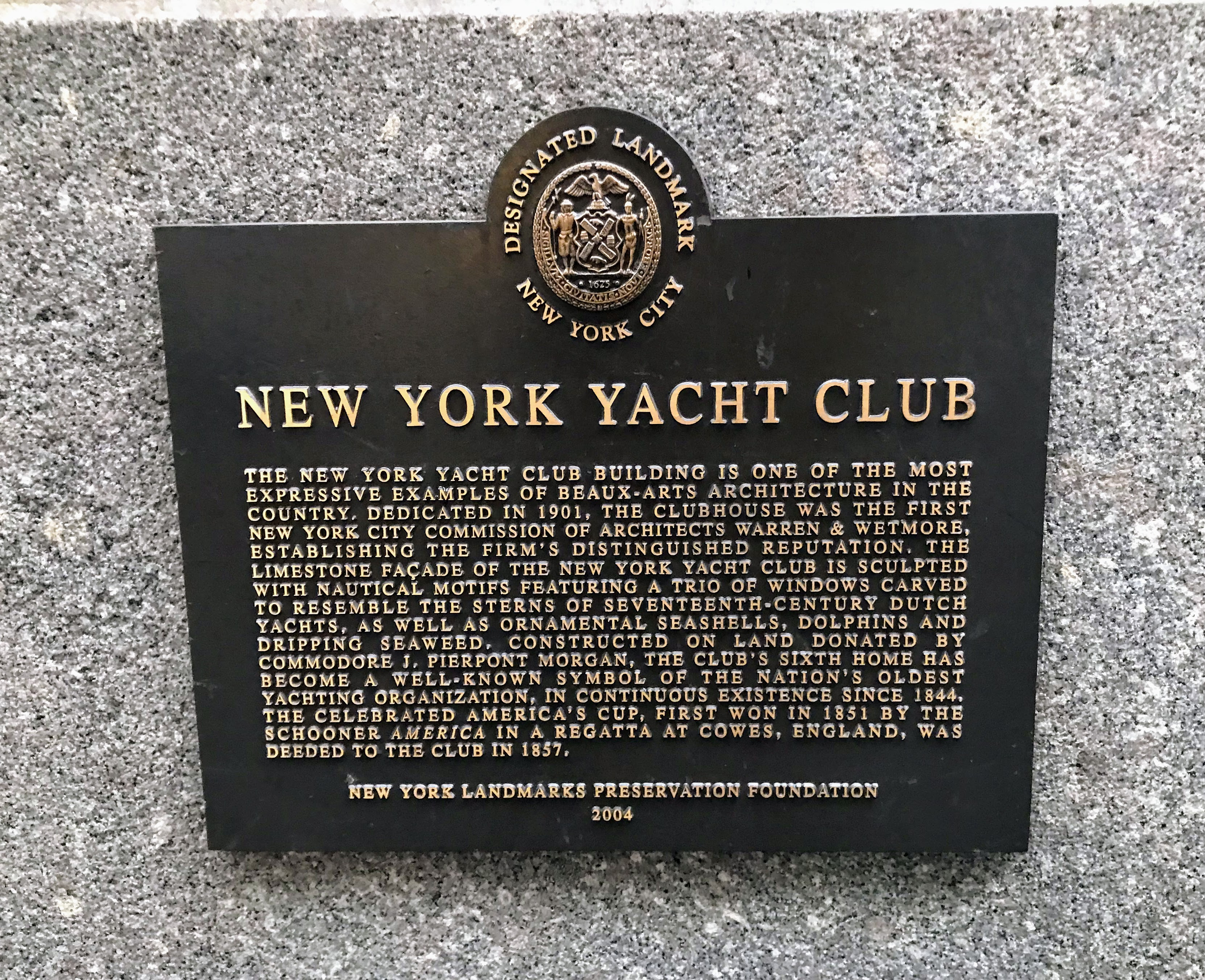
Landmark plaque for the New York Yacht Club Building

The New York City Landmarks Preservation Commission (LPC) designated the New York Yacht Club Building as a city landmark on September 11, 1979, The club had opposed the designation, which would make it more difficult to modify the building, and the NYYC and LPC became involved in a legal dispute over the city-landmark status. The club's lawyer had claimed that the building had "no historical significance" and that it should not have been designated just because the clubhouse contained the America's Cup, "the ugliest sporting trophy in the world". The NYYC subsequently lost the 1983 America's Cup to the Royal Perth Yacht Club, and the America's Cup trophy, which had been a longtime fixture of the clubhouse, was removed from the model room. During this decade, the Yacht Racing Association of Long Island Sound also had offices on the sixth floor of the clubhouse. By then, the NYYC no longer had a dock in New York City.

The club began renovating the building's interior in 1985, restoring chandeliers and other architectural details to their original condition. The building was further designated as a National Historic Landmark in 1987. After the interior modifications were completed, the club started renovating the exterior in 1992 at a cost of $600,000. The NYYC requested permission from the LPC to restore the flagpoles and pergola on the facade. The club also planned to remove the gray paint on the facade, since the paint had decreased the porosity of the stone, which in turn had caused moisture problems. The following year, Eliot Soffes of architectural firm Paino/Soffes designed a restoration of the pergola at a projected cost of $35,000. The pergola was rebuilt entirely for aesthetic purposes, as the rooftop terrace under the original pergola was not rebuilt. These renovations were conducted in advance of the club's 150th anniversary.

In the 1990s, the NYYC sold 280,000 square feet (26,000 m^{2}) of the site's unused air rights to the developers of the Sofitel, which was built immediately to the west. During the Sofitel's construction, workers underpinned the New York Yacht Club Building's foundation and erected scaffolding above the skylight. The grill room and model room were cleaned prior to the clubhouse's 100th anniversary in 2001. Before this renovation, the grill room had never been cleaned, and the walls had been blackened by the residue that had accumulated over the prior century. The NYYC hosted a party in January 2001 to mark the clubhouse's centennial, at which point the club had grown to 3,000 members. To celebrate the anniversary, John Rousmaniere wrote a book about the building's history.

== Critical reception ==
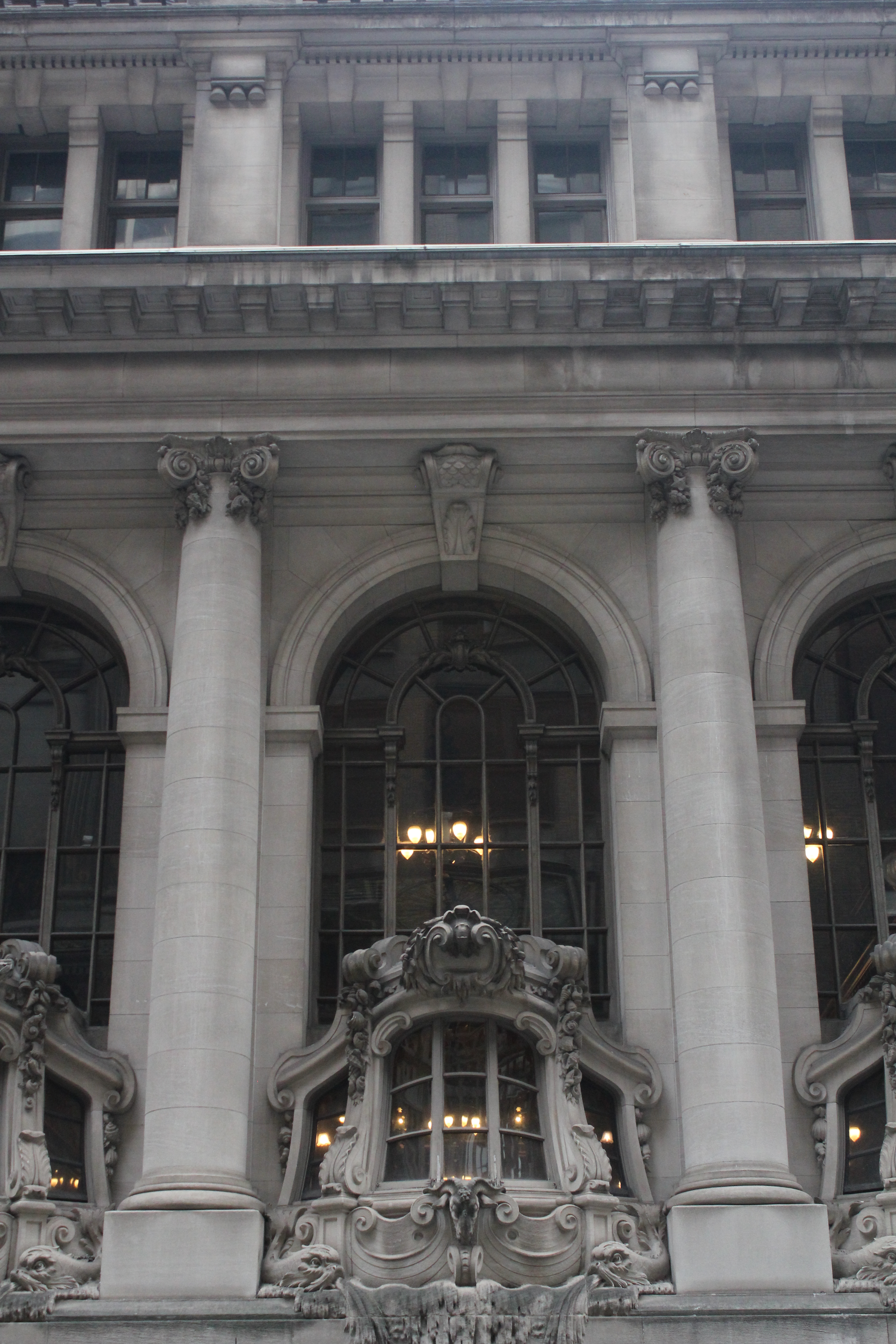
Detail of arched windows

After the clubhouse was completed, A. J. Kenealy wrote for Outing magazine, "The interior is superb in every way, combining all the luxuries and conveniences of this sybarite age", praising the model room and grill room in particular. Scientific American magazine wrote that Warren & Wetmore's design had produced "an extremely pleasing and satisfactory result" and that the cozy ambiance of the interior "should be a sine qua non in every clubhouse". Frederick Toombs of Town & Country magazine wrote that, while the facade "presents a most inviting appearance [...] it is not until the interior is seen that the building and its equipment is best appreciated". The Washington Post stated: "One of the most interesting spots that an enthusiastic yachtsman can visit is the model room of the New York Yacht Club". Architectural Review magazine wrote that there was "some semblance of reserve in the exterior", but it sharply criticized the interior: "Surely this is not legitimate architectural design. It is very pleasant fooling, but scarcely anything more." Architectural Review particularly criticized the space as having a "riot of swags and spinach, icicles and exotic vegetation".

The clubhouse continued to receive critical acclaim long after its completion. Upon the NYYC's 70th anniversary in 1914, The New York Times wrote that the 44th Street clubhouse was "one of the finest buildings of the kind in the city". The New York Herald Tribune wrote in 1927 that the building has "such distinction and dignity as to arrest the attention of passers-by", but that the model room and the grill are "perhaps the most interesting spots". At the club's centennial in 1944, the Herald Tribune wrote that the 44th Street building represented "the growth of the club and the spread of its influence". The Times called the clubhouse "one of the city's most attractive structures" in 1959, while another writer described the structure as a "bulbous stone fantasy". Times architecture critic Ada Louise Huxtable described the building as "a baroque extravaganza with flowing water carved below galleon‐shaped windows". A writer for Vanity Fair said in 2012 that "the windows look like they were plucked from a galleon".

The NYYC wrote of its own building: "There is no industrial restlessness in Whitney Warren's remarkable building on West 44th Street. Here, all that moves is the imaginary bow wave under a favorite model and, if one looks at the fireplace long enough, the occasional sway of the seaweed." Rousmaniere said in 2001: "It seems strange that an elite club, and that's what they were, was so open. But [the club] wanted you to look in." Robert Mackay, of the Society for the Preservation of Long Island Antiquities, described the model room as "one of the great rooms of the city in terms of architectural heritage".

== See also ==
- List of National Historic Landmarks in New York City
- List of New York City Designated Landmarks in Manhattan from 14th to 59th Streets
- National Register of Historic Places listings in Manhattan from 14th to 59th Streets
