= New York 36 =

Sailboat class

- NY 36

Development
- Designer: William E. Cook
- Location: United States
- Year: 1980
- No. built: 88
- Builder: W. D. Schock Corp
- Role: Racer
- Name: New York 36

Boat
- Displacement: 10,000 lb (4,536 kg)
- Draft: 6.33 ft (1.93 m)

Hull
- Type: monohull
- Construction: fiberglass
- LOA: 35.67 ft (10.87 m)
- LWL: 29.00 ft (8.84 m)
- Beam: 11.67 ft (3.56 m)
- Engine: Volvo 2002 13 hp (10 kW) diesel engine

Hull appendages
- Keel: fin keel
- Ballast: 4,200 lb (1,905 kg)
- Rudder: internally-mounted spade-type rudder

Rig
- Rig type: Bermuda rig
- I foretriangle height: 42.90 ft (13.08 m)
- J foretriangle base: 12.80 ft (3.90 m)
- P mainsail luff: 46.50 ft (14.17 m)
- E mainsail foot: 16.00 ft (4.88 m)

Sails
- Sailplan: fractional rigged sloop
- Mainsail area: 372.00 sq ft (34.560 m^{2})
- Jib/genoa area: 274.56 sq ft (25.507 m^{2})
- Total sail area: 646.56 sq ft (60.067 m^{2})

The New York 36 is an American sailboat that was designed by William E. Cook as an International Offshore Rule (IOR), as well as a one design racer, which was first built in 1980.

== Production ==
The design was built by W. D. Schock Corp in the United States, from 1980 until 1985, with 88 boats completed, but it is now out of production.

== Design ==
The design came about as the result of some members of the New York Yacht Club (NYYC) asking Cook to design a boat specifically for one design racing at the club, but that would also be competitive in IOR handicap racing. Some of the production boats were sold to non-NYYC members on the US west coast.

Cook based the boat on his 1980 IOR One Ton class racer Firewater. The New York 36 used a taller mast for the lighter wind conditions found on western Long Island Sound, where it was anticipated the design would be raced and a cruising interior.

The New York 36 is a racing keelboat, built predominantly of fiberglass, with wood trim. It has a fractional sloop rig, a raked stem, a sharply reverse transom, an internally mounted spade-type rudder controlled by a tiller and a fixed fin keel. It displaces 10,000 lb (4,536 kg) and carries 4,200 lb (1,905 kg) of ballast.

The boat has a draft of 6.33 ft (1.93 m) with the standard keel fitted.

The boat is fitted with a Swedish Volvo 2002 diesel engine of 13 hp (10 kW) for docking and maneuvering. The fuel tank holds 20 U.S. gallons (76 L; 17 imp gal) and the fresh water tank has a capacity of 40 U.S. gallons (150 L; 33 imp gal).

The design has sleeping accommodation for six people, with a double "V"-berth in the bow cabin, a U-shaped settee and two aft quarter berths in the main cabin. The galley is located on the port side amidships. The galley is L-shaped and is equipped with a two-burner stove, icebox and a sink. A navigation station is opposite the galley, on the starboard side. The head is located just aft of the bow cabin on the port side and includes a shower.

The design has a hull speed of 7.28 kn (13.48 km/h).

== Operational history ==
At the NYYC the design was raced as part of the annual NYYC Cruise throughout the 1980s.

Some of the production boats that were sold to non-NYYC members on the US west coast were raced as a one design class there for a period of time.

== See also ==
- List of sailing boat types
