= McFarlane–Bredt House =

Historic house in Staten Island, New York

- U.S. National Register of Historic Places
- New York City Landmark
- Location within New York City Location within New York Location within the United States
- Location: 30 Hylan Blvd., Staten Island, New York
- Coordinates: 40°36′51″N 74°3′51″W
- Area: 3 acres (1.2 ha)
- Built: 1840s
- Architectural style: Italian-Swiss villa, Victorian country villa
- NRHP reference No.: 83001784
- NYCL No.: 1213

Significant dates
- Added to NRHP: September 8, 1983
- Designated NYCL: October 12, 1982

McFarlane–Bredt House is a historic home at 30 Hylan Boulevard in Rosebank, Staten Island, New York. It was built about 1840 and is a two-story, wood-frame clapboard house in the Italian Villa style. The house, located atop a hill on Staten Island's North Shore, faces New York Harbor to the northeast. It consists of four sections: the original, two-story central section built about 1840; the extension to the original section built about 1860; a wind added about 1870; and a three-story western addition completed in the 1890s.

The McFarlane–Bredt House served as the headquarters of the New York Yacht Club from 1869 to 1871. The New York City government acquired the adjoining McFarlane–Bredt and Alice Austen houses in 1970 and proposed renovating the McFarlane–Bredt House in the 1990s. It was added to the National Register of Historic Places in 1983.
