= New York 30 =

1905 class of racing sailboat

NY-30
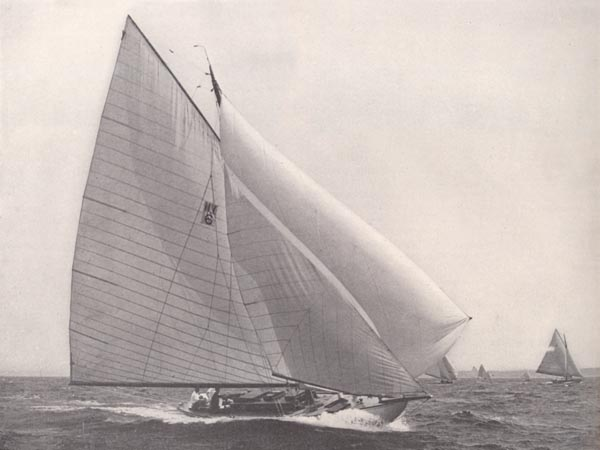

Development
- Designer: Nathanael Greene Herreshoff
- Location: Bristol, R.I.
- Year: 1905
- No. built: 18
- Design: One-Design Universal rule
- Builder: Herreshoff Manufacturing Company

Boat
- Displacement: 17,782 lb (8,066 kg)
- Draft: 6 ft 4 in (1.93 m)
- Air draft: 48 ft 6 in (14.78 m) top of gaff to waterline

Hull
- Type: Monohull
- Construction: Wood
- LOA: 43 ft 6 in (13.26 m)
- LWL: 30 ft (9.1 m)
- Beam: 8 ft 9 in (2.67 m)

Hull appendages
- Keel: Fixed
- Ballast: 8,800 lb (4,000 kg)

Rig
- Rig type: Gaff rig
- Mast height: 42 ft 7 in (12.98 m)
- Rig other: boom length 33 ft (10 m)

Sails
- Mainsail area: 770 ft^{2} (72 m^{2})
- Jib/genoa area: 287 ft^{2} (26.7 m^{2})
- Spinnaker area: 400 ft^{2} (37 m^{2})
- Other sails: balloon jib 372 ft^{2} (34.6 m^{2})
- Upwind sail area: 1,057 ft^{2} (98.2 m^{2})
- Downwind sail area: 1,542 ft^{2} (143.3 m^{2})

The New York 30 (NY-30) is a monohull sailboat designed by Nathanael Greene Herreshoff in 1904 as a class for the New York Yacht Club. It was the first one-design class designed for the Universal Rule of yacht measurement: "It is the first model I have worked on to be under the 1/4 beam length [Universal Rule] measurements, and I am well pleased with it, and also it has been more pleasure to work on it, as I have not had the restraint of getting the biggest boat possible for the W.L. length."

== List of NY-30 yachts ==
Eighteen yachts were built to the NY-30 Class rule in 1905 by the Herreshoff Manufacturing Company.

Boat	Hull number	Names	Owners	Comments
1	626	Alera	A.H. and J.W. Alker, John L. Cutler, Francis W. Belknap, Howard F. Whitney, Harold Palmer & Stanley R. Latshaw, S. C. Slaughter, Clifford F. Baker, Fred Benton Bjarnow, P. J. Hunt Sr., W. A. Cannon Jr., H. H. Lancaster & A. L. Holmes, Daniel Michael Donovan & Dianne Dorothy Donovan, Terrance J McClinch	Restored by David Stimson from Boothbay Harbor Shipyard in 2005.
2	627	Ibis	C. O'Donnell Iselin	
3	628	Atair	Cord Meyer	The bright star in the constellation Aquila
4	629	Maid of Meudon	W. D. Guthrie	Mr Guthrie's mother family lived in Meudon near Paris in the 18th century, and the name of her father's country place in Ireland was Meudon
5	630	Pintail, Gossip, Yolanda, Lena, Cockatoo II	August Belmont, E.D. Morgan, Lloyd Griscom, Ogden Reid, Gerard Lambert, William Winberg Jr., Lloyd Bergeson	She was lost in 1979, south of Greenland, during the return trip of an transatlantic crossing to Norway
6	631	Dahinda	Wm. Butler Duncan Jr.	Dahinda is from Longfellow's Hiawatha and means Bullfrog
7	632	Tabasco, Alice	Henry F. Lippit, Gherardi Davis	Mr Lippit named his yacht after this particular kind of pepper, he had another yacht called Paprika
8	633	Carlita	Oliver Harriman	
9	635	Adelaide II, Amorita	Philip H. and George A. Adee, Fred B. Bragdon, A. G. Paine, 3rd, Hendon Chubb, Howard C. Brokaw, Francis W. Belknap, George W. Lau, Jed Pearsall	In July 2007 Amorita was tragically struck during the Robert H. Tiedeman Regatta by the 1914 94 ft Fife design Sumurun. She sank immediately in 55 ft of water of Jamestown, RI and was recovered only 3 days after. She was rebuilt at MP&G in Mystic, CT and relaunched in June 2011.
10	636	Linnet	Amos Tuck French	
11	637	Oriole	Lyman Delano	
12	638	Neola II, Hera II, Okee III, Amaranth, Rowdy, Okee, Minx, Rowdy	George M. Pynchon, Holland Duell, Marek Jachimczyk, Ted Boylan	Neola was an Indian princess of the Tuscarora tribe. She has been faithfully restored to original Herreshoff specifications between 2011 and 2014.
13	648	Minx	Howard Willets	Broken up on Long Island in 1986.
14	639	Cara Mia	Stuyvesant Wainwright	
15	640	Banzai	Newbury D. Lawton	Banzai is 'cheer' in Japanese and means "Ten thousand years!" / a/o 2026 still sailing in Long Island Sound, New York
16	642	Nautilus	A.G. and H.W. Hanan	a/o 2026 still sailing by owner Oakcliff Sailing Center on Long Island Sound, New York
17	643	Phryne	Henry L. Maxwell	Phryne was a famous Athenian beauty, said to have been one of Praxiteles' model
18	648	Anemone II, Caprice, Alerion II, Adios, Blue Moon, Caprice, Anemone Jr.	John Murray Mitchell	

== Construction ==
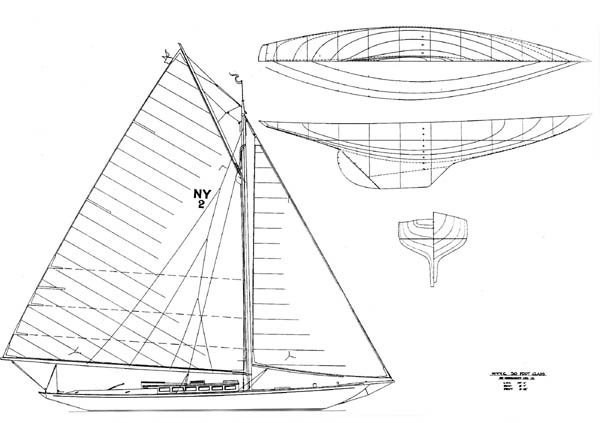
New York 30 class design

The requirements from the NYYC members were: "A wholesome seaworthy craft, free from freak features, about 30 feet waterline, with short overhangs, moderate beam and draft, cabin house, complete but simple outfit for cruising, sail area about 1000 square feet."

N. G. Herreshoff proposed the following design: 43'6" LOA, 30' LWL, 8'10" beam, 6'3" draft; "framing best white oak; fastening bronze and copper; planking yellow pine, to be double below the turn of the bilge to the sheerstrake, the inner thickness to be of cypress; deck selected white pine canvas covered; Mahogany raised cabin house; outside lead ballast; sloop rigged"

The 18 boats were built at an impressive speed. Alera was built in 35 days and launched on January 3, 1905. Each of the other 17 were completed in one week intervals. All boats were ready for delivery by mid-April 1905. The Herreshoff Manufacturing Co was building three hulls at a time using molds. Other parts, designed to be interchangeable between one-design boats, were fabricated by other craftsmen.

Each boat was sold in 1905 for $4,200.

== MIT Museum - Hart Nautical Gallery ==
The Francis Russell Hart Nautical Museum collection contains hundreds of NY-30 documents: original plans (profile, body plan, table of offsets), various Herreshoff Manufacturing Co. records and historical photographs.

== Events ==
=== 1905 season ===
Thirteen NY-30 raced regularly during the 1905 first season. Based on thirty-eight races, the ranking was: 1 Cara Mia (Stuyvesant Wainwright), 2 Nautilus (Hanan brothers), 3 Alera, 4 Neola II, 5 Dahinda, 6 Atair, 7 Ibis, 8 Phryne (Harry Maxwell), 9 Banzai, 10 Minx, 11 Adelaide II, 12 Carlita, 13 Oriole, 14 Maid of Meudon, 15 Pintail, 16 Linnet, 17 Anemone II, 18 Tabasco.
