= Swan 47-2 =

Sailboat class

Development
- Designer: Sparkman & Stephens
- Location: Finland
- Year: 1976
- No. built: 10
- Builder: Oy Nautor AB
- Role: Offshore Cruiser-Racer
- Name: Swan 47-2

Boat
- Displacement: 34,400 lb (15,604 kg)
- Draft: 8.00 ft (2.44 m) with centerboard down

Hull
- Type: monohull
- Construction: glassfibre
- LOA: 47.83 ft (14.58 m)
- LWL: 36.24 ft (11.05 m)
- Beam: 13.76 ft (4.19 m)
- Engine: Volvo Penta MD21A 61 hp (45 kW) diesel engine

Hull appendages
- Keel: stub keel and centreboard
- Ballast: 17,500 lb (7,938 kg)
- Rudder: Skeg-mounted rudder

Rig
- Rig type: Bermuda rig
- I foretriangle height: 62.00 ft (18.90 m)
- J foretriangle base: 19.80 ft (6.04 m)
- P mainsail luff: 55.70 ft (16.98 m)
- E mainsail foot: 16.00 ft (4.88 m)

Sails
- Sailplan: Masthead sloop
- Mainsail area: 446 sq ft (41.4 m^{2})
- Jib/genoa area: 920 sq ft (85 m^{2})
- Spinnaker area: 2,207 sq ft (205.0 m^{2})
- Upwind sail area: 1,366 sq ft (126.9 m^{2})
- Downwind sail area: 2,652 sq ft (246.4 m^{2})

Racing
- PHRF: 69-84

The Swan 47-2, also called the Swan 47-2 S&S CB and the NYYC 48, is a Finnish sailboat that was designed by Sparkman & Stephens as an offshore cruiser-racer and first built in 1976.

The design is a centreboard-equipped development of the deep-draft keel Swan 47 of 1975.

== Production ==
The design was built by Oy Nautor AB in Finland, from 1976 to 1984, with 10 boats completed, but it is now out of production.

== Design ==
The Swan 47-2 is a racing keelboat, built predominantly of polyester glassfibre, with wood trim. The hull is solid fibreglass, while the deck is of fibreglass sandwich construction. It has a masthead sloop rig, with a keel-stepped mast, two sets of unswept spreaders and aluminum spars with discontinuous stainless steel rod rigging. The hull has a raked stem; a raised counter reverse transom; a skeg-mounted rudder controlled by a wheel and a stub keel with a retractable centreboard. It displaces 34,400 lb (15,604 kg) and carries 17,500 lb (7,938 kg) of lead ballast.

The boat has a draft of 8.00 ft (2.44 m) with the standard keel.

The boat is fitted with a Swedish Volvo Penta MD21A diesel engine of 61 hp (45 kW) for docking and manoeuvring. The fuel tank holds 96 U.S. gallons (360 L; 80 imp gal) and the fresh water tank has a capacity of 130 U.S. gallons (490 L; 110 imp gal).

The design has sleeping accommodation for five people, with a double "V"-berth in the bow cabin, an L-shaped settee and a straight settee in the main cabin and twp aft cabins, one with a double berth on the starboard side and a single berth cabin to port. The galley is located on the port side just abaft of the companionway ladder. The galley is a split design and is equipped with a three-burner stove, an ice box and a double sink. A navigation station is opposite the galley, on the starboard side. There are two heads, one just aft of the bow cabin on the port side and one on the starboard side, aft.

For sailing downwind the design may be equipped with a symmetrical spinnaker of 2,207 sq ft (205.0 m^{2}).

The design has a hull speed of 8.07 kn (14.95 km/h) and a PHRF handicap of 69 to 84.

== See also ==
- List of sailing boat types
