= ClubSwan 42 =

Sailboat class

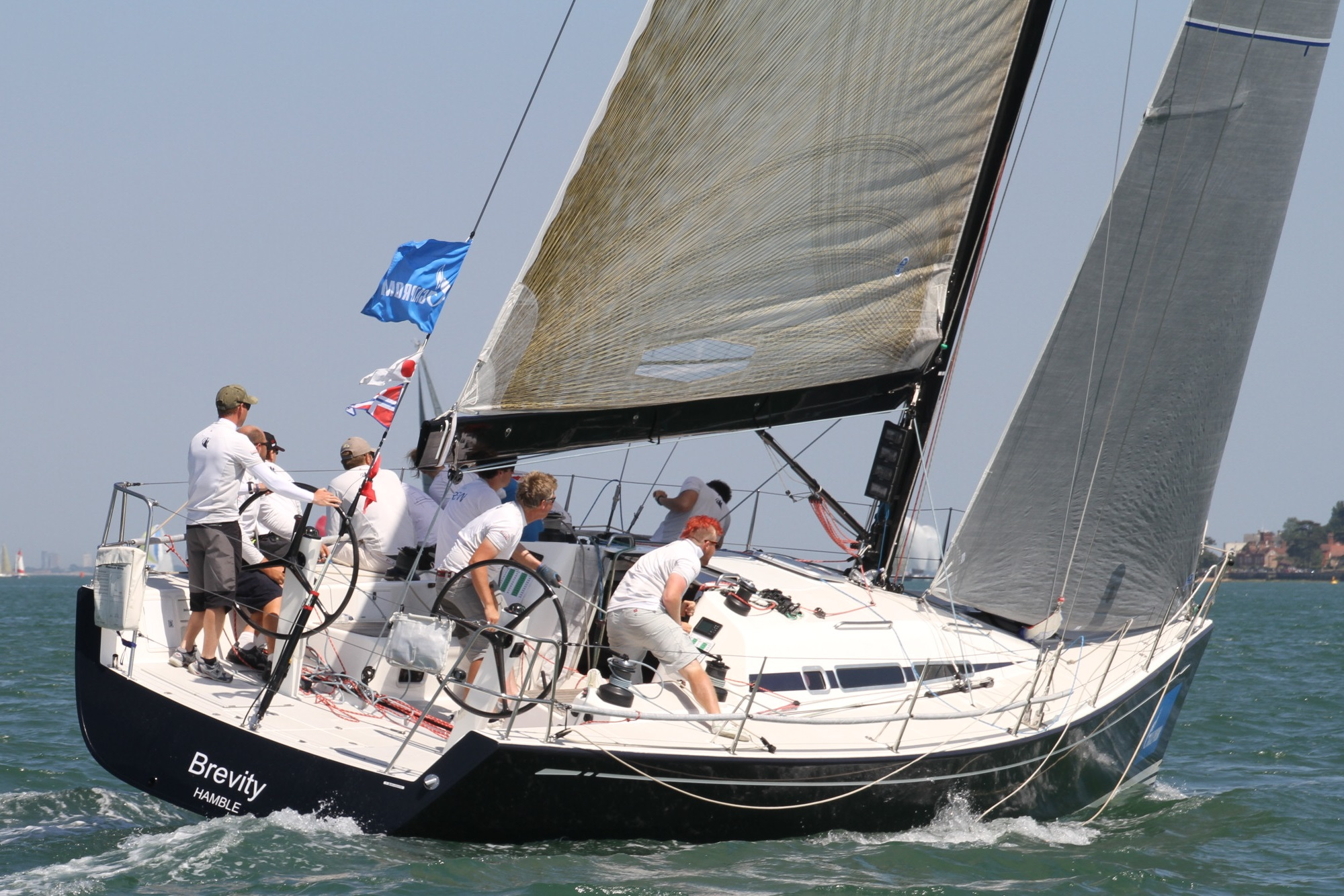

Development
- Designer: Germán Frers
- Location: Finland
- Year: 2005
- No. built: 58
- Builder: Oy Nautor AB
- Role: Racer-Cruiser
- Name: ClubSwan 42

Boat
- Displacement: 16,500 lb (7,484 kg)
- Draft: 8.86 ft (2.70 m)

Hull
- Type: monohull
- Construction: glassfibre
- LOA: 42.58 ft (12.98 m)
- LWL: 37.04 ft (11.29 m)
- Beam: 12.89 ft (3.93 m)
- Engine: Volvo Penta 40 hp (30 kW) diesel engine

Hull appendages
- Keel: Fin keel with weighted bulb
- Ballast: 7,046 lb (3,196 kg)
- Rudder: Spade-type rudder

Rig
- Rig type: Bermuda rig
- I foretriangle height: 59.06 ft (18.00 m)
- J foretriangle base: 16.34 ft (4.98 m)
- P mainsail luff: 56.56 ft (17.24 m)
- E mainsail foot: 18.95 ft (5.78 m)
- Mast height: 62.89 ft (19.17 m)

Sails
- Sailplan: Fractional rigged sloop
- Mainsail area: 661 sq ft (61.4 m^{2})
- Jib/genoa area: 515 sq ft (47.8 m^{2})
- Gennaker area: 1,991 sq ft (185.0 m^{2})
- Upwind sail area: 1,175 sq ft (109.2 m^{2})
- Downwind sail area: 2,652 sq ft (246.4 m^{2})

The ClubSwan 42, also called the Club Swan 42 and the New York Yacht Club 42 (NYYC 42), is a Finnish sailboat that was designed by Germán Frers as a one design racer-cruiser and first built in 2005.

== Production ==
The design was a joint project between the New York Yacht Club (NYYC) and Finnish company Oy Nautor AB who built the boats in Estonia. Production ran from 2005 until 2013 with 58 boats completed. Boats built for members of the NYYC were delivered as the NYYC 42 and boats sold to others were marketed as the ClubSwan 42. Of an initial order of 36 boats, 25 went to NYYC members.

== Design ==
The class was conceived by David Elwell, of the NYYC as a boat for club cruises, regattas and offshore racing, including the Newport Bermuda Race and International Rating Certificate competition. The class concept was promulgated as a competition with Oy Nautor AB winning.

The ClubSwan 42 is a racing keelboat, built predominantly of glassfibre, with wood trim. It has a 9/10 fractional sloop rig, with a keel-stepped mast, two sets of swept spreaders and a Hall Spars carbon fibre mast with an aluminium boom. The hull has a slightly raked stem, a reverse transom, an internally mounted spade-type rudder controlled by dual wheels and a fixed fin keel with a weighted bulb. It displaces 15,983 lb (7,250 kg) and carries 7,046 lb (3,196 kg) of lead ballast.

The boat has a draft of 8.86 ft (2.70 m) with the standard keel.

The boat is fitted with a Swedish Volvo Penta diesel engine of 40 hp (30 kW) for docking and manoeuvring. The fuel tank holds 39 U.S. gallons (150 L; 32 imp gal) and the fresh water tank has a capacity of 84 U.S. gallons (320 L; 70 imp gal).

The design has sleeping accommodation for six people, with a double "V"-berth in the bow cabin, two straight settees in the main cabin and two aft cabins each with two berths. The galley is located on the port side just forward of the companionway ladder. The galley is L-shaped and is equipped with a two-burner stove, an ice box and a sink. A navigation station is opposite the galley, on the starboard side. The head is located just aft of the bow cabin on the port side.

For sailing downwind the design may be equipped with an asymmetrical spinnaker of 1,991 sq ft (185.0 m^{2}), flown from a retractable bowsprit.

The design has a hull speed of 8.16 kn (15.11 km/h).

== Operational history ==
The boat is supported by an active class club that organizes racing events, the Swan 42 Class.

In a 2007 Sailing World review, Barrett Holby wrote, "in light air the boat showed a good turn of speed. It sailed upwind very easily and excelled downwind. The 26.63 sail-area-to-displacement ratio explains why it does so well in light air, and although we sailed it in a 6-knot breeze, it required maximum crew weight on the rail [the one-design class maximum crew weight is 1,870 pounds]."

In a 2007 review for Sailing Magazine, John Kretschmer wrote, "the CS 42 has been described by her maker as a club racer-cruiser with adequate amenities for weekend adventures and sleeping aboard, make no mistake, she's a thoroughbred meant for dashing through the waves, not hanging on the hook. To paraphrase the great writer Gertrude Stein, rose is a rose is a rose, by any other name, and this one is a race boat."

== See also ==
- List of sailing boat types
