= Ambrose Snow =

New York Pilot boat

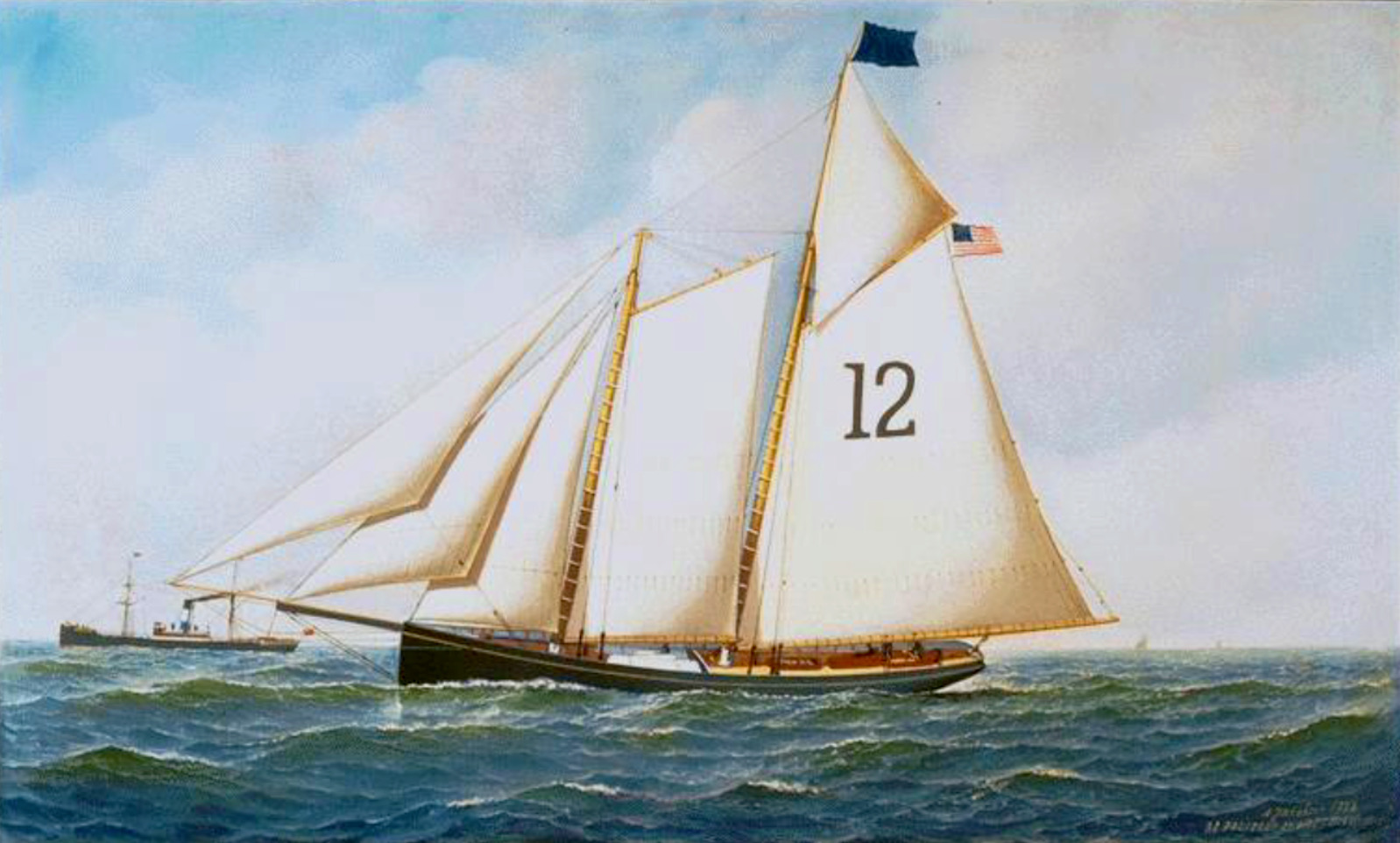
- New York pilot boat Ambrose Snow, No. 12, by Antonio Jacobsen

History

United States
- Name: Ambrose Snow
- Namesake: Ambrose Snow, president of the New York Board of Pilots
- Owner: New York Pilots
- Operator: Charles Alkens, William Murphy
- Builder: C. & R. Poillon shipyard
- Cost: $15,000
- Launched: July 3, 1888
- Christened: July 3, 1888
- Out of service: 1919
- Stricken: Sold

General characteristics
- Class & type: Schooner
- Tonnage: 140-tons TM
- Length: 92 ft 0 in (28.04 m)
- Beam: 21 ft 9 in (6.63 m)
- Depth: 10 ft 0 in (3.05 m)
- Propulsion: Sail

Ambrose Snow was a 19th-century Sandy Hook pilot boat, built in 1888 from the C. & R. Poillon shipyard, for a group of New York Pilots. She sank after being struck by the Clyde line freighter Delaware in 1912. She was raised and reentered pilot service. In 1915, Ambrose Snow was one of only five remaining boats patrolling the port of New York. She remained in operation for thirty-seven years.

== Construction and service ==
New York Pilot-boat Ambrose Snow, No. 12 was launched on July 3, 1888, from the C. & R. Poillon shipyard, at the foot of Clinton Street. The daughter of Peter McEnaney broke the champagne bottle over her bow. Her name was in honor of Ambrose Snow, the president of the New York Board of Pilots. The boat number "12" was painted as a large number on her mainsail, that identified the boat as belonging to the New York and Sandy Hook Pilots. The launch was witnessed by the owners, Peter McEnaney and others in the company of New York pilots, along with friends and Captain Ambrose Snow. Her dimensions were 92 feet in length, 21.9 feet breadth of beam, 10 feet depth of hold, and 140-tons (carpenter's measurement). She cost $15,000.

On 31 December 1888, Pilot Charles Alkens and two sailors on the pilot-boat Ambrose Snow, No. 12 tried to board the Nova Scotia barque Latonie off Block Island in a yawl when the boat was capsized. Alkens and one of the sailors made it onto the bark but one of the sailors, Peter Williams, was drowned.

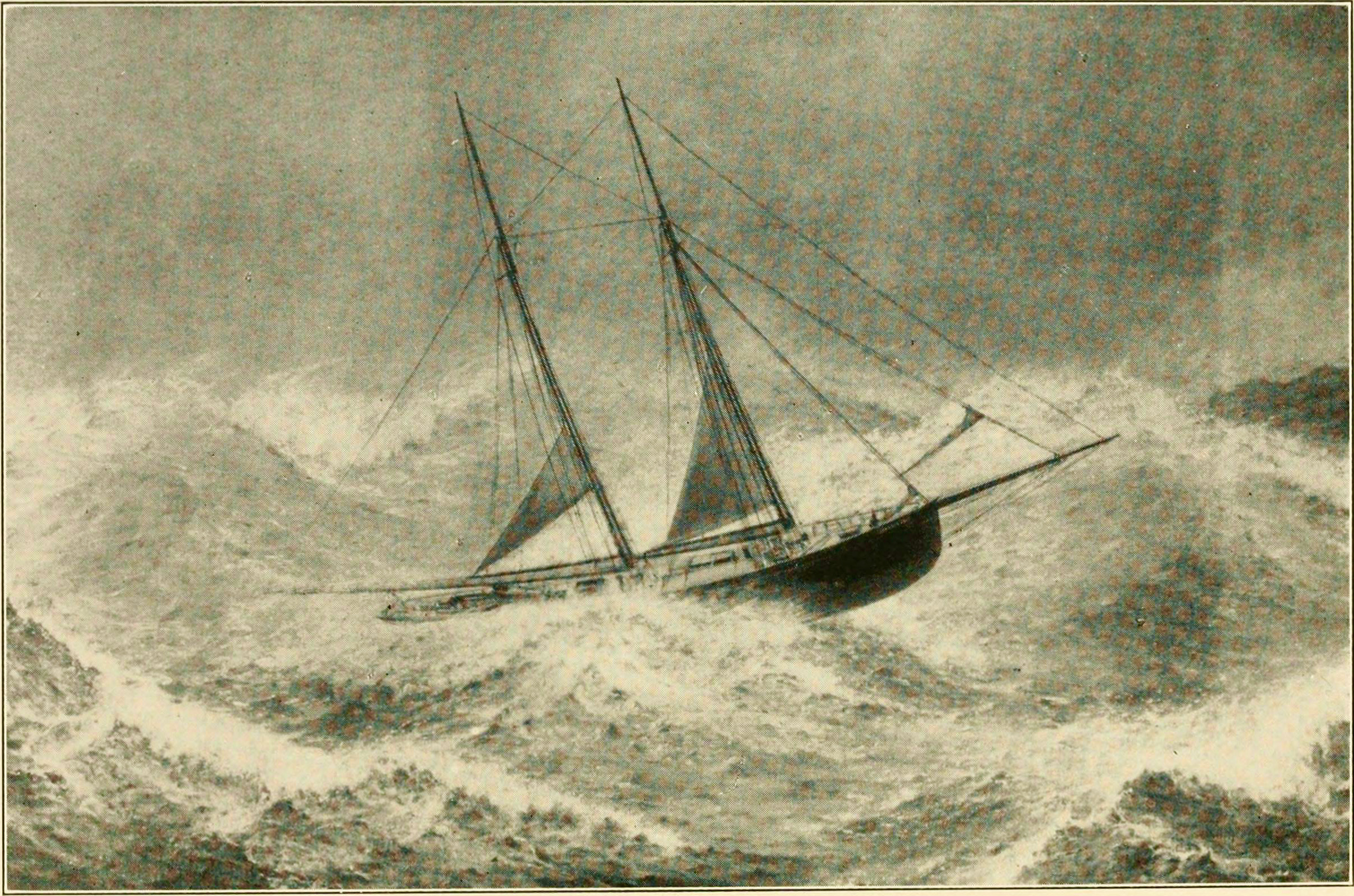
Ambrose Snow pilot boat riding out a gale

On September 16, 1903, when the Naphtha boat Chief became disabled in the Lower Bay, the pilot boat Ambrose Snow rescued eight passengers and took them on board.

On 13 May 1912, the pilot-boat Ambrose Snow, No. 2 sank after being struck by the Clyde line freighter Delaware in the main ship channel in the Lower Bay of the New York Harbor in dense fog. There were no deaths. Ambrose Snow was raised and reentered pilot service. A suit for collision was filed by the New York Sandy Hook Pilots Association and owner of the pilot boat Ambrose Snow in the New York district court on April 15, 1913, against the steamship Delaware, of the Clyde Steamship Company. The verdict was against the pilot-boat for going across the course of the steamer, instead of maintaining her course as required by pilot rules.

On 11 March 1915, Ambrose Snow, No. 2 was one of only five remaining boats patrolling the port of New York. They were Ambrose Snow, No. 2, the Trenton, No. 4, the Washington, No. 5, the New York and the New Jersey pilot boats.

== End of service ==
By 1919, the two-masted schooner Ambrose Snow was still in operation as a passenger freight boat, taking passengers on cruises in the Atlantic, the latest being 33 days out from St. Vincent, Cape Verde Islands with 53 passengers aboard, bound for New Bedford, Massachusetts a Portuguese colony. She was later sold for a Brava packet and abandoned in 1925.

== See also ==
- List of Northeastern U.S. pilot boats
