= List of shipwrecks in April 1939 =

The list of shipwrecks in April 1939 includes ships sunk, foundered, grounded, or otherwise lost during April 1939.

== 1 April ==
List of shipwrecks: 1 April 1939
Ship	State	Description
Antioquia	Colombia	The steamboat sank at Barranquilla.

== 2 April ==
List of shipwrecks: 2 April 1939
Ship	State	Description
Capitaine Damiani	France	The tanker ran aground at Port-de-Bouc, Bouches-du-Rhône and was holed. She was refloated after 250 tons of oil was offloaded.

== 3 April ==
List of shipwrecks: 3 April 1939
Ship	State	Description
Henry S. Grove	United States	The cargo ship ran aground at Balboa, Panama. She was refloated the next day.

== 7 April ==
List of shipwrecks: 7 April 1939
Ship	State	Description
Carl Vinnen	Germany	The schooner ran aground in the San Pedro Channel, Argentina.
Shengjin	(Albanian Kingdom (1928–1939)) Albanian Navy	Italian invasion of Albania: The patrol boat was hit by artillery fire from Italian warships and sank at the port of Durrës.

== 8 April ==
List of shipwrecks: 8 April 1939
Ship	State	Description
Coryda	Netherlands	The tanker ran aground at Gibraltar. She was refloated the same day.
Koura	Finland	The cargo ship ran aground off Jastarnia, Poland.
Temple Bar	United Kingdom	The cargo ship struck a rock and sank 20 nautical miles (37 km) south of Cape Flattery, Washington, United States. Her crew survived. She was declared a total loss.
Trak	Turkey	The passenger ship ran aground in the Gulf of Mudania and was severely damaged. She was refloated the next day and escorted to Istanbul for repairs.

== 9 April ==
List of shipwrecks: 9 April 1939
Ship	State	Description
Asnæs	Denmark	The cargo ship collided with Butt (Germany) in the Kiel Canal, Germany and was beached. A Lloyd's Open Form contract for her salvage was annulled by the company appointed to salvage her due to the situation the ship was in. She was formally abandoned by her owners leaving the canal authorities to arrange salvage on a special contract.
Hilary	United Kingdom	The cargo liner ran aground at Carmel Head, Anglesey and was holed. All passengers were taken off by lifeboat. She was refloated later that day and sailed to Liverpool, Lancashire for inspection.

== 12 April ==
List of shipwrecks: 12 April 1939
Ship	State	Description
Elengo A. Kydoniefs	Greece	The cargo ship ran aground at Almadies, French West Africa and was a total loss. Her crew were rescued.
Hebrides	United Kingdom	The cargo ship ran aground in fog at Pollywilline, Mull of Kintyre, Argyllshire. She was refloated undamaged later that day.
Sapphire	United Kingdom	The coaster collided with Clan Cameron (United Kingdom) 15.5 nautical miles (28.7 km) off St David's Head, Pembrokeshire. Two of her nine crew were killed. Sapphire was taken in tow by Neptunia (Germany) and Warden (United Kingdom) but sank 7 nautical miles (13 km) south of the South Bishop Lighthouse.
Zeester	Netherlands	The coaster came ashore at Scroby, Norfolk, United Kingdom. She was later refloated.

== 13 April ==
List of shipwrecks: 13 April 1939
Ship	State	Description
Passaic Sun	United Kingdom	The tanker came ashore at Rockport, Maine, United States. It was estimated that 70,000 imperial gallons (320,000 L) of cargo would need to be unloaded before the ship could be refloated.

== 14 April ==
List of shipwrecks: 14 April 1939
Ship	State	Description
Eskdalegate	United Kingdom	The cargo ship ran aground in the River Parana, Argentina. She was refloated the next day.

== 15 April ==
List of shipwrecks: 15 April 1939
Ship	State	Description
Brooklands	United Kingdom	The schooner was driven ashore at Ballyhack, County Wexford, Ireland.
Pollenzo	Italy	The cargo ship ran aground in the Kiel Canal, Germany. She was later refloated.

== 17 April ==
List of shipwrecks: 17 April 1939
Ship	State	Description
Ellenis	Greece	The cargo ship came ashore on Thassos. She was refloated on 20 April.

== 18 April ==
List of shipwrecks: 18 April 1939
Ship	State	Description
Eileen	Australia	The ketch was wrecked near Point Charles, Northern Territory.
Paris	France	Paris, 1941 The ocean liner caught fire and capsized at Le Havre, Seine-Inférieure. Scrapping did not occur for almost a decade due to World War II.

== 19 April ==
List of shipwrecks: 19 April 1939
Ship	State	Description
Inspiration	Nicaragua	The cargo ship ran aground at Banes, Cuba and was severely damaged.
Valley Camp	United Kingdom	The cargo ship ran aground in the St. Lawrence River at Brockville, Ontario, Canada and was holed. She was refloated on 23 April after 900 tons of cargo was offloaded. Subsequently drydocked for repairs.

== 20 April ==
List of shipwrecks: 20 April 1939
Ship	State	Description
Tahime Maru	Japan	The cargo ship ran aground at Ohtamisaki.

== 22 April ==
List of shipwrecks: 22 April 1939
Ship	State	Description
Mayflower	United Kingdom	The coaster ran aground in Liverpool Bay. She was refloated on 30 April.
Syotoku Maru	Japan	The cargo ship ran aground in fog at Okujiri Island. She was refloated on 26 April.

== 24 April ==
List of shipwrecks: 24 April 1939
Ship	State	Description
Pilar de Larrinaga	United Kingdom	The cargo ship ran aground in the Saigon River, French Indo-China. She was refloated on 27 April.
Start Point	United Kingdom	The cargo ship ran aground in Hell Gate, New York, United States and was damaged. Later refloated with the assistance of tugs.

== 25 April ==
List of shipwrecks: 25 April 1939
Ship	State	Description
Kinko Maru, and Seiko Maru	Japan	The cargo ships collided off Moji. Both vessels sank but all on board were rescued.

== 27 April ==
List of shipwrecks: 27 April 1939
Ship	State	Description
Ida Z. O.	Italy	The cargo ship ran aground in the Delaware River, Philadelphia, Pennsylvania, United States. She was refloated the next day.
Sandy Hook	United States	The pilot boat collided with the ocean liner Oslofjord (Norway) and sank in the Atlantic Ocean west of Sandy Hook, New Jersey, off the Ambrose Lightship ( United States Lighthouse Service) (40°27.556′N 073°49.490′W). Oslofjord rescued all 26 crew members and harbor pilots on board.
Toneline	United Kingdom	The tanker ran aground south of Tuzla, Yugoslavia.

== 29 April ==
List of shipwrecks: 29 April 1939
Ship	State	Description
Oakland	United States	The motor vessel sank 500 feet (150 m) off Cape Chacon, Territory of Alaska (54°41′30″N 132°00′50″W). Her crew of five survived and reached shore in a skiff; one hiked to McLeans Arm for help, and the motor vessel Reiance (United States) rescued the other four from the beach on 1 May. Oakland was on a voyage from Hydaburg to Ketchikan.

== Unknown date ==
List of shipwrecks: Unknown Date April 1939
Ship	State	Description
V-10 Ana	Spanish Navy	Spanish Civil War: The auxiliary patrol ship was lost sometime in April.
