= New Jersey (pilot boat) =

New Jersey Pilot boat

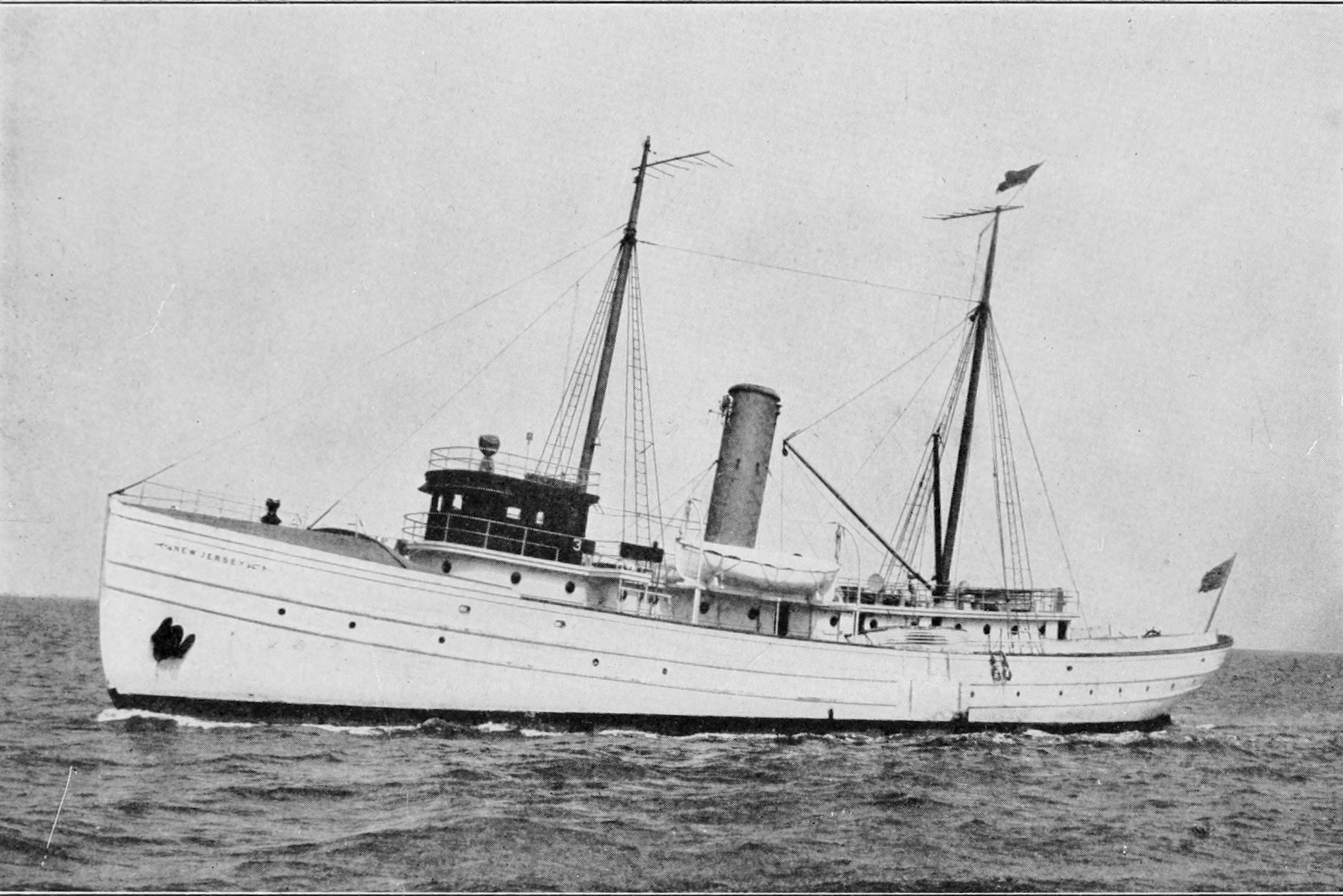
- Steam Pilot Boat New Jersey, built for New Jersey State Commission.

History

United States
- Name: New Jersey
- Namesake: New Jersey
- Owner: New Jersey Pilots
- Operator: John Lyle
- Builder: A. C. Brown & Sons
- Cost: $90,000
- Launched: 28 May 1902
- Christened: 28 May 1902
- Out of service: 10 July 1914
- Fate: Sank

General characteristics
- Class & type: schooner
- Tonnage: 248 Net Tonage
- Length: 158 ft 0 in (48.16 m)
- Beam: 28 ft 0 in (8.53 m)
- Draft: 13 ft 0 in (3.96 m)
- Depth: 19 ft 0 in (5.79 m)
- Propulsion: Sail and steam motor
- Notes: She had electric lights and yawl launching devices.

The New Jersey was a steam pilot boat built by A. C. Brown & Sons of Tottenville, Staten Island in 1902 for the New York and New Jersey Sandy Hook Pilots' Association. After twelve years of service, the steamship SS Manchioneal rammed and sank her off Ambrose Lightship in 1914. The New Jersey was replaced by the pilot boat Sandy Hook.

== Construction and service ==
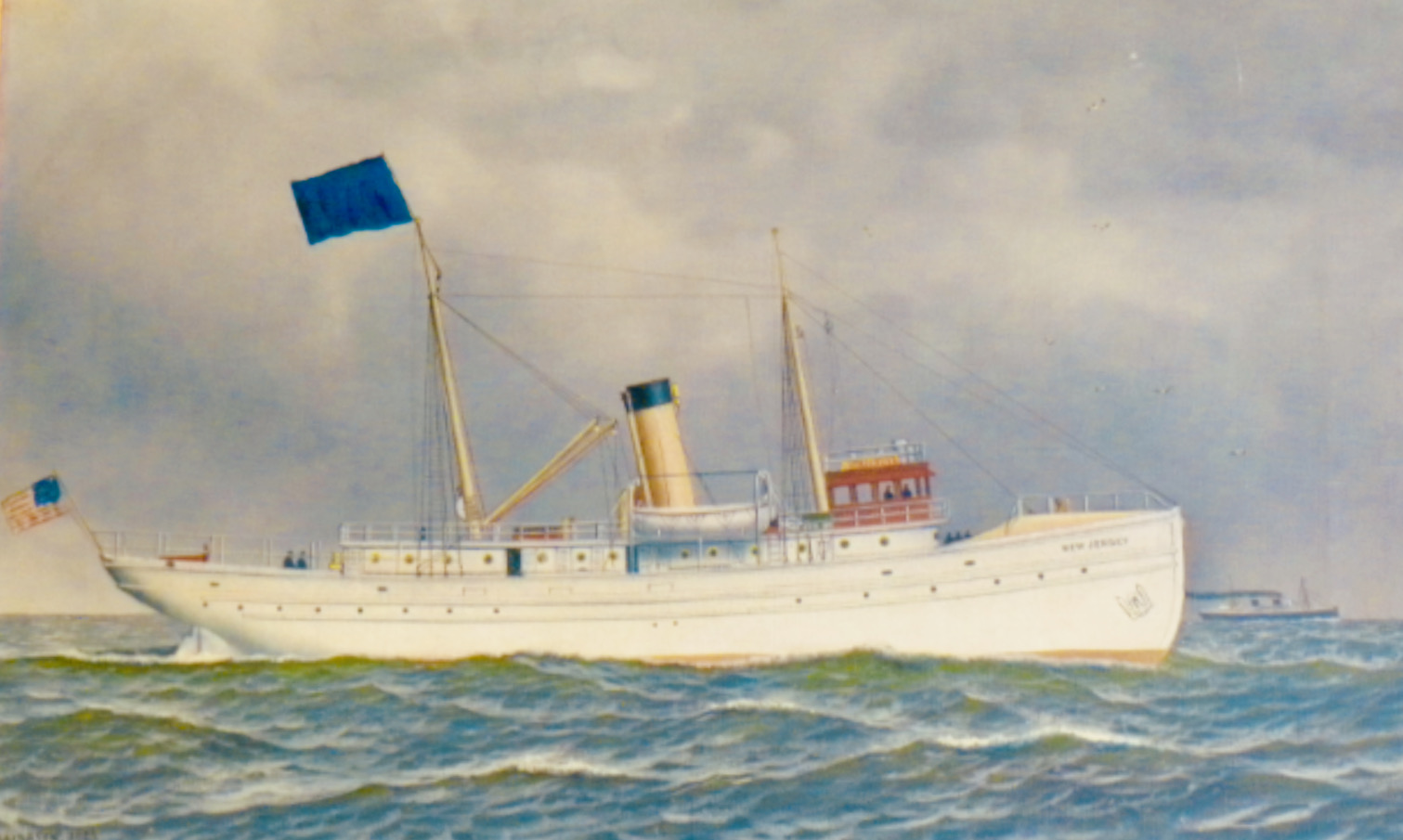
New Jersey pilot boat by Antonio Jacobsen, ca. 1903.

In 1902, the steam pilot-boat New Jersey was built by A. C. Brown & Sons of Tottenville, Staten Island for the New York and New Jersey Pilot Boat Association.

The New Jersey was launched on 28 May 1902 at Tottenville, Staten Island, in the attendance of over one thousand people. She was christened by Bessie Brown, the daughter of the builder of A. C. Brown & Sons, by breaking a bottle of champagne over the bow. Her dimensions were 158 ft. in length; 28 ft. breadth of beam; 18.6 ft. in depth; 14 ft. mean draft. She was 2 ft. longer than the New York. She had triple-expansion engines of 650-horse power. She went into commission on 12 November 1902.

At this time, the New York and New Jersey Pilots' Association were united. As a result, the New Jersey and the New York, took up the task of doing pilot work at the Sandy Hook lightship. The New Jersey was so well constructed that she was used as an ice-breaking ram during the winter months.

On 30 September 1912, Captain John Lyle from the pilot-boat New Jersey, rescued eight men from the motorboat Dewey, when their boat had drifted ten miles from the Sandy Hook Light. The men were employed at the U.S. Metal Refining Company of Carteret, New Jersey.

== End of service ==
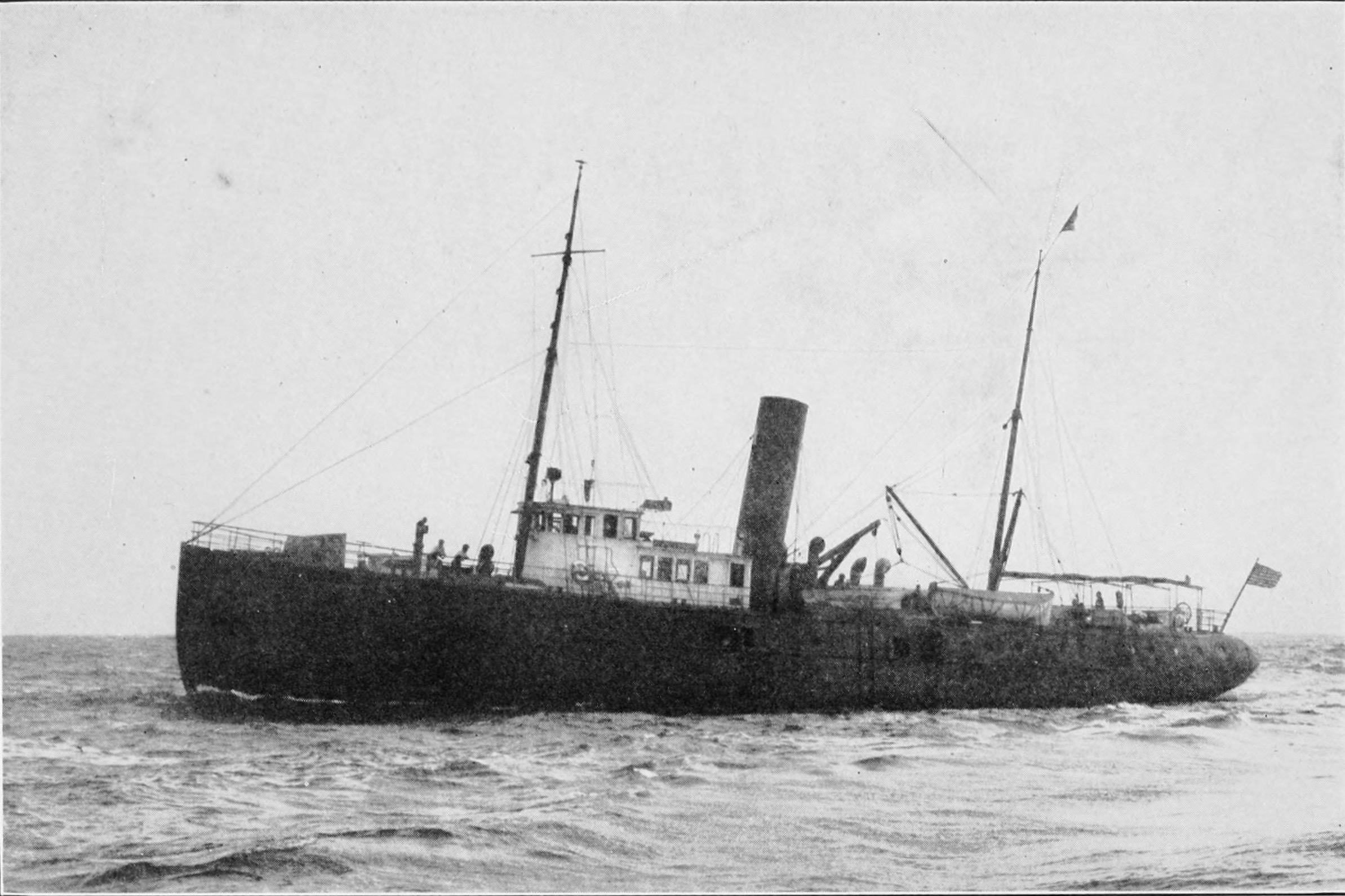
Steam Pilot Boat Sandy Hook.

On 10 July 1914, after only twelve years of pilot service, in a dense fog, the United Fruit steamship Manchioneal, rammed and sank the New Jersey, off the Ambrose Lightship. The crew of 17 men were rescued by the Manchioneal.

The steam pilot boat Sandy Hook, was purchased to replace the lost New Jersey.

== See also ==
- List of Northeastern U. S. Pilot Boats
