= Trenton (pilot boat) =

New Jersey Pilot boat

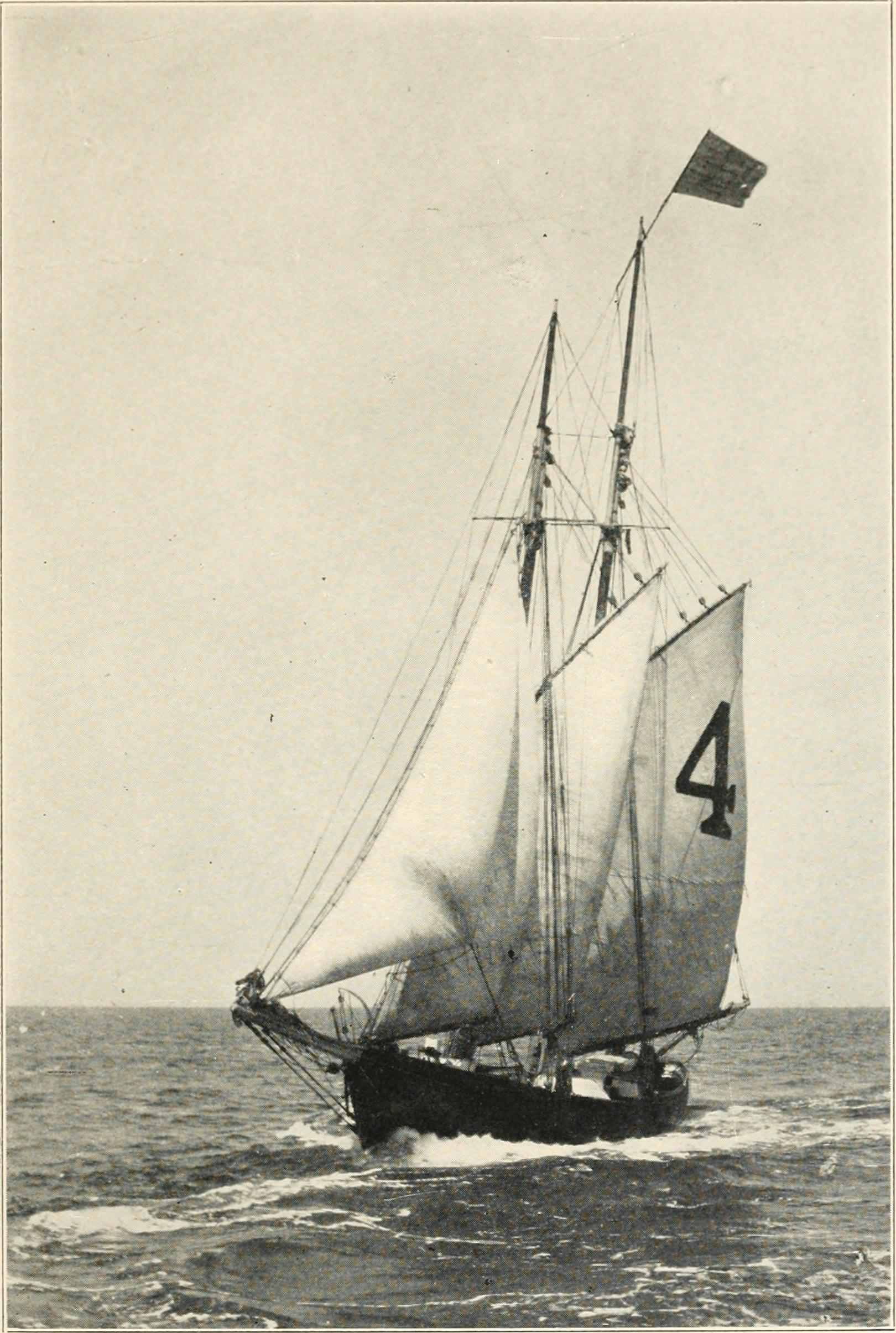
- Pilot Boat Trenton, No. 4., formerly the fishing schooner Kernwood.

History

United States
- Name: Trenton
- Namesake: Trenton, New Jersey
- Owner: New Jersey Pilots
- Operator: Charles O. Beebe
- Builder: Oxner & Story
- Launched: 1904
- Out of service: 1934
- Fate: Sold

General characteristics
- Class & type: schooner
- Tonnage: 83-tons TM
- Length: 87 ft 0 in (26.52 m)
- Propulsion: Sail and auxiliary motor

The Trenton was an auxiliary motor pilot boat built in Essex County, Massachusetts for a company of New Jersey Sandy Hook pilots in 1907. She was formerly the fishing schooner Kernwood, designed by Thomas F. McManus of Boston in 1904. As a pilot boat, she spent twenty-five years in pilot service before being placed out of service in 1934.

== Construction and service ==
The pilot-boat Trenton, No. 4, was an auxiliary motor pilot boat purchased for the New Jersey pilot service in late 1907. She was formerly the fishing schooner Kernwood, which they renamed Trenton.

Captain Herbert Thompson was captain of the schooner Kernwood, that went out on her maiden voyage in June 1904. The Kernwood was designed by Thomas F. McManus of Boston and was built by Oxner & Story in Essex County, Massachusetts. The boat was 87 ft. in length, 83-tons, and had a round bow.

Captain Charles O. Beebe was assigned to the pilot boat Trenton, and sailed to Long Branch, New Jersey on 10 October 1910, looking for incoming steamers. The Trenton, had a crew of six and six Apprenticeship boys under the instruction of Captain Beebe. Captain Walter Earl, of East Orange, New Jersey was one of the pilots. Charles Beebe was the son of James D. M. Beebe, who sailed with his father, one of the best known pilots in the New York Harbor.

In 1931, in place of what was once thirty pilot boats, there were only three steam pilot boats, the Trenton, New York, and Sandy Hook, remaining in the pilot fleet.

== End of service ==
During 1934, the reserve pilot boat Trenton, was judged unfit for pilot use and was replaced by the auxiliary schooner Wanderer.

On the November 22, 1934, the Trenton and two other boats, sailed from New Bedford, Massachusetts to Cape Verde Islands off the African coast with passengers of Portuguese and African descent. On December 29, 1934, the Trenton was the only boat that arrived safely at Cape Verde after a five-week journey.

On February 6, 1935, the Trenton struck a reef, which caused her to capsize. The crew on board were able to escape in lifeboats and reached land near Dakar, a city in West Africa.

== See also ==
- List of Northeastern U. S. Pilot Boats
