= MS Oslofjord (1937) =

Ocean liner sunk after hitting a mine off the River Tyne

- Oslofjord in Copenhagen

History

Norway
- Name: Oslofjord
- Operator: Norwegian America Line
- Port of registry: Oslo
- Builder: Deutsche Schiff- und Maschinenbau, Bremen
- Laid down: 15 May 1936
- Launched: 29 December 1937
- Acquired: May 1938
- Fate: Sunk 1941

General characteristics
- Tonnage: 18,673 GRT
- Length: 179.20 m (587 ft 11 in)
- Beam: 22 m (72 ft 2 in)
- Draught: 10.40 m (34 ft 1 in)
- Installed power: 2 x MAN diesel engines
- Capacity: 860 passengers

MS Oslofjord was an ocean liner built in 1936 by A/G Weser Shipbuilders, Bremen, Germany, for Norwegian America Line. She was of 18,673 gross register tons and could carry 860 passengers. She had an uneventful career from 1937 until 1939, when she collided with an American pilot boat. She saw brief service in World War II, before sinking in 1941 after hitting a mine.

== Career ==
=== Early years ===
The 18,673 GRT motor ship was built on 15 May 1936, and launched on 29 December 1937, at Bremer Schiffswerft AG Weser, was 171.75 meters long, 22.37 meters wide, and five decks high. 860 passengers (152 in cabin class, 307 in tourist class, and 401 in third class) and 310 crew members were taken on board. The Oslofjord was powered by four seven-cylinder diesel engines from Maschinenfabrik Augsburg-Nürnberg AG, which acted on two propellers. The transfer to the owners took place in May 1938. The shipping company Den Norske Amerikalinje was founded in 1910 to establish a passenger service between Norway and the United States. Their ships served the Oslo – Kristiansand – Stavanger – Bergen – New York route.

On 27 April 1939, Oslofjord collided with the American 160-foot (48.8 m) pilot boat Sandy Hook in the North Atlantic Ocean west of Sandy Hook, New Jersey, off the Ambrose Lightship at 40°27.556′N 073°49.490′W. Sandy Hook sank in 100 feet (30 m) of water, and Oslofjord rescued all 26 crew members and harbor pilots on board Sandy Hook.

=== World War II ===
During World War II, Oslofjord sank after just two years of service on the night of 21–22 January 1941 after hitting a mine in the North Sea off the coast of England of the River Tyne on 1 December 1940. Her wreck lies in 15 metres (49 ft) of water at 55°0.17′N 1°23.72′W.
