= Favorita (pilot boat) =

New York Pilot boat

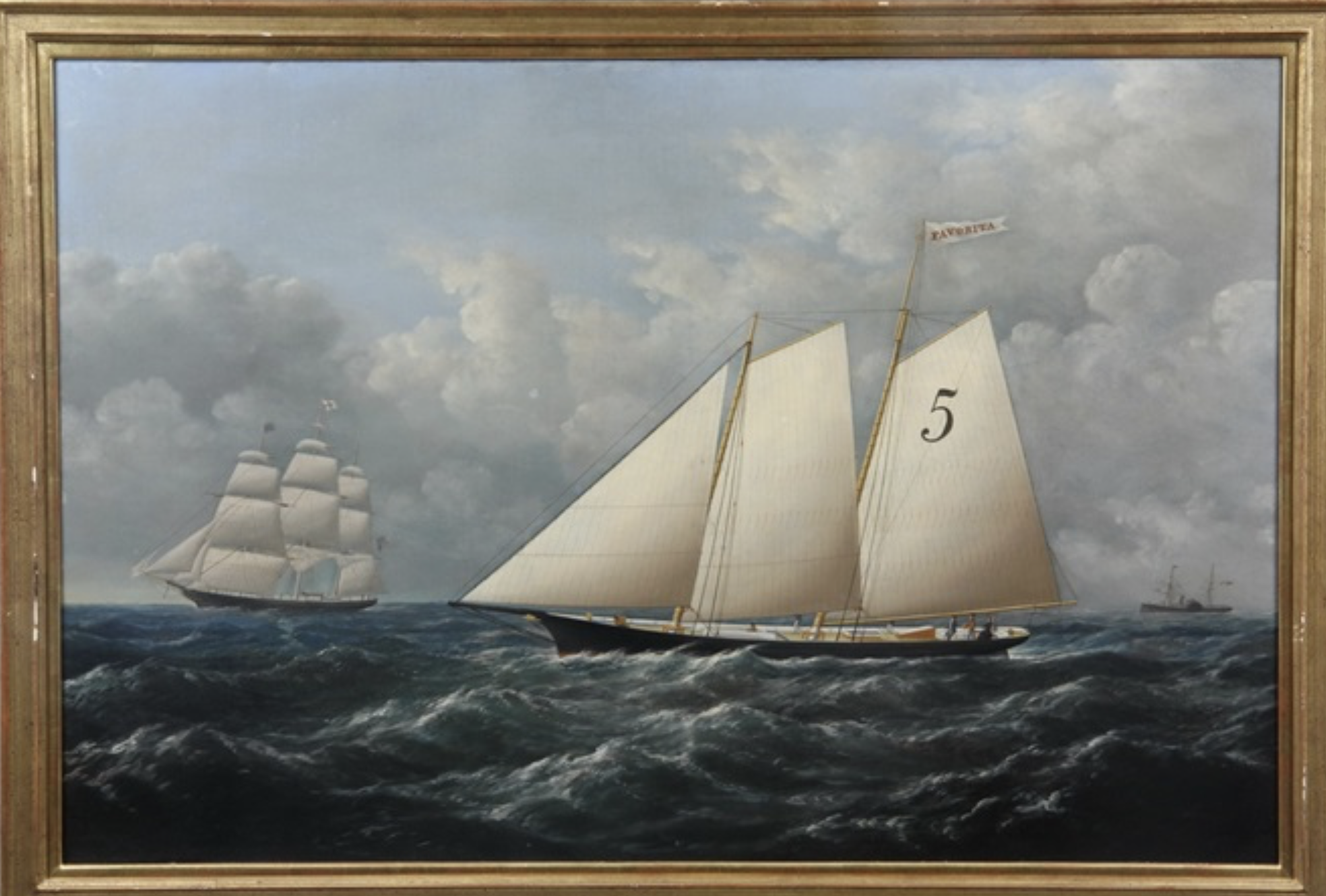
- Pilot boat Favorita, No. 5, meeting a clipper ship, painting by Conrad Freitag.

History

United States
- Name: Favorite
- Namesake: Favourite
- Owner: New York Pilots
- Operator: William C. Fowler, Captain Coombs
- In service: 1820s
- Homeport: Port of New York
- Fate: Sunk

General characteristics
- Tons burthen: 30-tons
- Propulsion: schooner sail
- Sail plan: Schooner-rigged

Favorite or Favorita, was a 19th-century New York Sandy Hook pilot boat built in the early 1820s. She helped transport New York City maritime pilots between inbound or outbound ships coming into the New York Harbor. Favorite collided with a United States steamer and sank in 1865 near Barnegat Lighthouse.

== Construction and service ==
New York Pilot boat Favorite was built in the early 1820s for a group of New York Pilots. A painting of her was made by marine artist Conrad Freitag meeting a clipper ship. The boat number "5" was painted as a large number on her mainsail, that identified her as belonging to the New York Sandy Hook Pilots.

In April 1823, a message in a bottle was found by the pilot boat Favorite in the Boston Bay, which told a story of piracy, which happened on the Euphrates when Captain Henshaw, bound for Charleston, South Carolina, left Cuba on March 5, 1823, and was captured by a pirate schooner Despaho. The Euphrates was burned, a pilot on board was put to death and Captain Henshaw and his crew were placed on board the Despaho. Charles McFadden signed the letter that was in the bottle, left off Cape Florida on March 17, 1823.

On November 9, 1826, the pilot boat Favorite took the passengers and crew that were on the sloop Native traveling from Bucksport, South Carolina for Boston, Massachusetts into town. The sloop struck the Harding Rocks in the rain at night and sank in five minutes. The passengers and crew escaped in a boat and spent the night at Point Alderton before being picked up by the pilot boat.

On May 22, 1827, the pilot boat Favorite was in command by Captain Coombs, who came across the schooner Olive Branch from Bath that was shipwrecked. The schooner had struck the Devil's Back inside the Graves and then ran into the Broad Sound Channel, Boston, having lost her sails at night, filled with water and fell over. The passengers and crew took to the rigging for safety until the pilot boat took them off. One passenger died in the rigging.

Captain William C. Fowler joined the pilot service in 1833 on the pilot boat Favorite, under Captain Benjamin Sweet, where he stayed for one year. At that time, no boat numbers were painted on the pilot boats.

From 1836 to 1843, there were reports about the pilot boat Favorite, being in the waters along New England putting pilots on board incoming ships into the Port of New York. On May 24, 1841, she was 25 miles southwest of Montauk Point Light, Long Island when she took in tow the sloop Experiment from Savannah, Georgia. The sloop got caught in a gale and had lost her rudder and jib.

There are also reports of the pilot boat "Favorite" from New Bedford, Massachusetts that sailed in December 1848 to San Francisco, California, carrying four persons with Captain Wheldon. She was spotted on January 24, 1849, off the coast of Brazil. The Favorite was only thirty-tons burthen. She was the smallest vessel and took 171 days to make the voyage from the Atlantic to the Pacific.

The next report appears on December 27, 1864, when the pilot boat Favorita, No. 5 was off Fire Island, Long Island when she placed a pilot on board the ship Cultivator traveling from Liverpool.

== End of service ==
On Thursday, February 1, 1865, the New York pilot boat Favorita, No. 5, left port and on Saturday, February 2nd met up with the brig Fashion, from Cienfuegos, Cuba and put on board the pilot William T. Beebe. After witch, a government steamer from New-York, the City of Port-au-Prince, ran into and sunk the pilot boat Favorite on Tuesday, February 6, 1865, about 17 miles east southeast from Barnegat Lighthouse. She was hit on the starboard bow, which cut through about eight feet, causing the vessel to sink in two minutes, in seventeen fathoms of water. Another report listed the boat at the pilot boat Favorite.

The pilots on board the Favorite were James D. M. Beebe, Alonzo H. Beebe, both sons of Theophilus Beebe, James W. Hurrell and John Rearden. The crew managed to get on board the steamer with all lives saved, but they were unable to save anything from the boat. One of the crew, Nathaniel "Nathan" Wood, was the last to get off the pilot boat and get on board the steamer, but he was badly injured. The captain of the steamer was Captain Curtis, who furnished clothing, shelter and food to the passengers while they were on board his steamer.

The incident with the New York pilot boat Favorita was reported to the Office of the board of Commissioners of Pilotage of New Jersey, on January 2, 1866.

== See also ==
- List of Northeastern U. S. Pilot Boats
