= Sandy Hook (pilot boat) =

New York Pilot boat

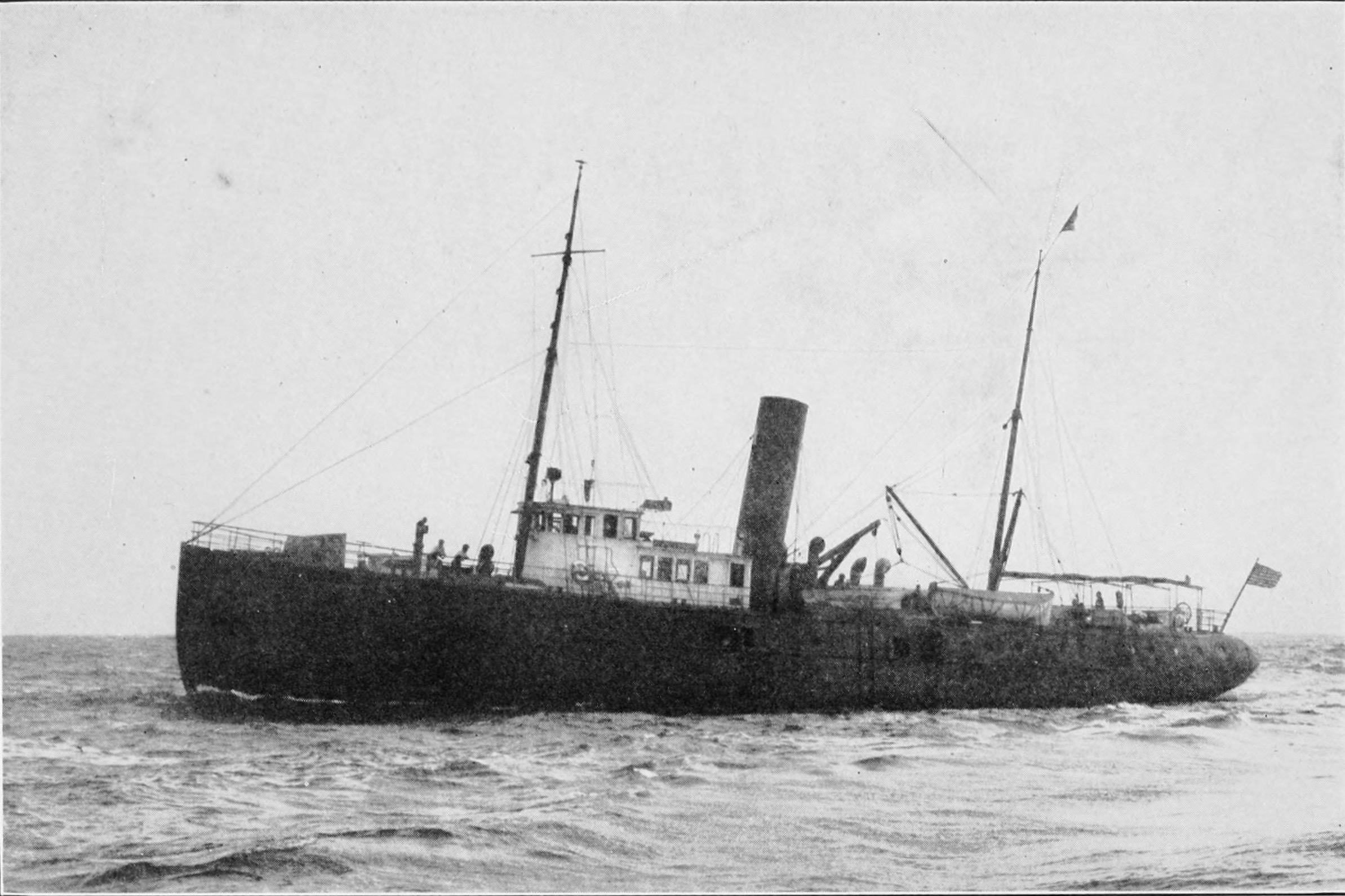
- Steam Pilot Boat Sandy Hook

History

United States
- Name: Sandy Hook
- Namesake: Sandy Hook
- Owner: New York and New Jersey Sandy Hook Pilots Association
- Operator: William Healy
- Builder: Lewis Nixon
- Launched: September 12, 1902
- Out of service: April 27, 1939
- Fate: Sank

General characteristics
- Class & type: schooner
- Tonnage: 361-tons
- Length: 168 ft 6 in (51.36 m)
- Beam: 24 ft 4 in (7.42 m)
- Depth: 12 ft 6 in (3.81 m)
- Propulsion: Sail and triple-expansion 1,000-horse power steam engines

Sandy Hook was a steam pilot boat built in 1902, by Lewis Nixon at the Crescent Shipyard in Elizabeth, New Jersey. In 1914, she was purchased by the New York and New Jersey Sandy Hook Pilots Association to replace the pilot boat New Jersey, that was lost in 1914. She could carry 10 to 12 pilots that would help guide ships through the New York Harbor. The Norwegian America Line Oslofjord, with the Crown Prince Olav of Norway and Princess Märtha of Sweden on board, ran into and sank the Sandy Hook in 1939.

== Construction and service ==
The steel steam Sandy Hook was formerly the yacht Anstice. She was launched on September 12, 1902, by Lewis Nixon of the Crescent Shipyard at Elizabeth, New Jersey for fishing in the Gulf of Mexico.

In 1903, Robert A. C. Smith, of New York, purchased the steamer Anstice and converted her into a yacht at the Harlan and Hollingsworth Company in Wilmington, Delaware. Her dimensions were 168.6 ft. in length; 24.4 ft. breadth of beam; 12.6 ft in depth; and 361-tons. She was built with an 1,000-horse power engine powered by oil.

On April 24, 1907, Robert A. C. Smith's Anstice name was changed to Privateer. Smith and his friends sailed on the Privateer for the Jamestown Exposition, commemorating the 300th anniversary of the founding of Jamestown in the Virginia Colony.

=== Pilot boat ===
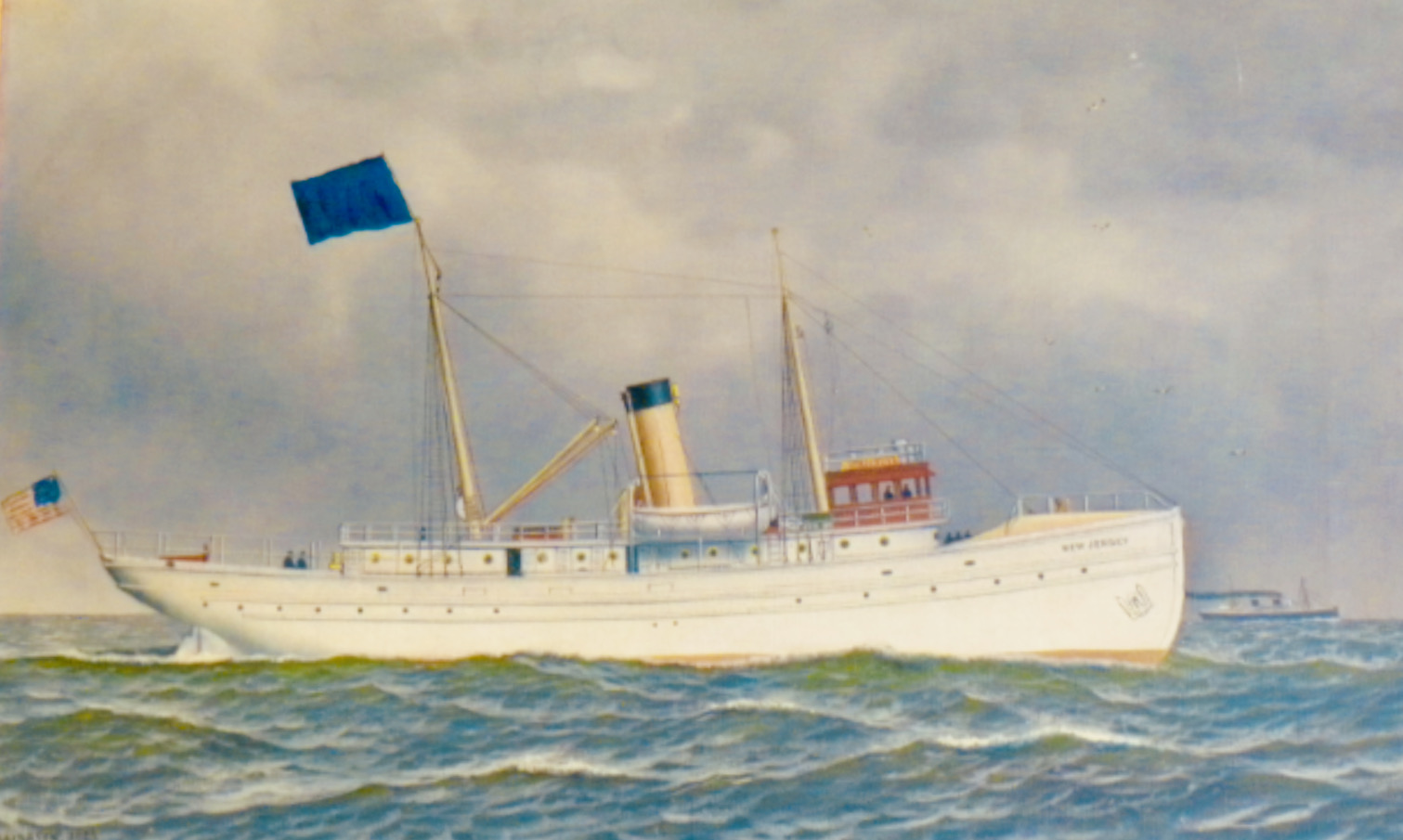
Pilot boat New Jersey (1902–1914), was replaced by the pilot boat Sandy Hook in 1914.

In 1914, the Privateer yacht was purchased by the New York and New Jersey Pilots' Association from Robert A. C. Smith to replace the pilot boat New Jersey, that was sunk by the steamship SS Manchioneal in 1914. She was renamed Sandy Hook. Her companion vessel was the pilot boat New York. Her hailing port was New York City. Her ship Master was William Baeszler.

On September 19, 1915, James Howard Van Pelt, at age 58, died while boarding a Standard Oil tanker No. 95, outside Ambrose Light during rough weather. He was on the pilot boat Sandy Hook when he slipped from the ladder trying to board the barge and hit his head on the pilot boat's yawl.

On December 1, 1918, the pilot boat Sandy Hook helped to rescue seven passengers from death near the Ambrose Channel Lightship during stormy weather. Captain William Healy, commander of the Sandy Hook took on board the men just before the fifty-foot motorboat, W. D. Anderson sank.

In 1931, in place of what was once thirty pilot boats, there were only three steam pilot boats remaining in the pilot fleet, the Trenton, the New York, and the Sandy Hook.

== End of service ==
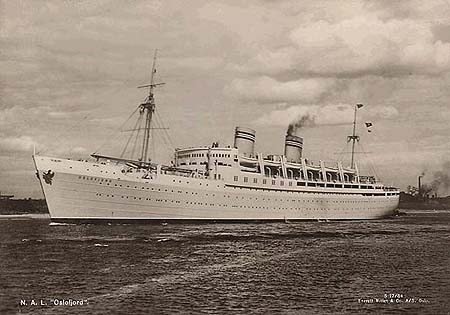
Norwegian America Line Oslofjord.

On April 27, 1939, in a dense fog off Ambrose Lightship, the Norwegian America Line Oslofjord, with the Crown Prince Olav of Norway and Princess Märtha of Sweden on board, ran into and sank the pilot boat Sandy Hook, No. 2. The Oslofjord rescued all 26 crew members and harbor pilots on board Sandy Hook.

The royal party was in New York City to open the Norwegian Pavilion at the 1939 New York World's Fair and a coast to coast tour.

== See also ==
- List of Northeastern U. S. Pilot Boats
