= James D. M. Beebe =

Sandy Hook Pilot

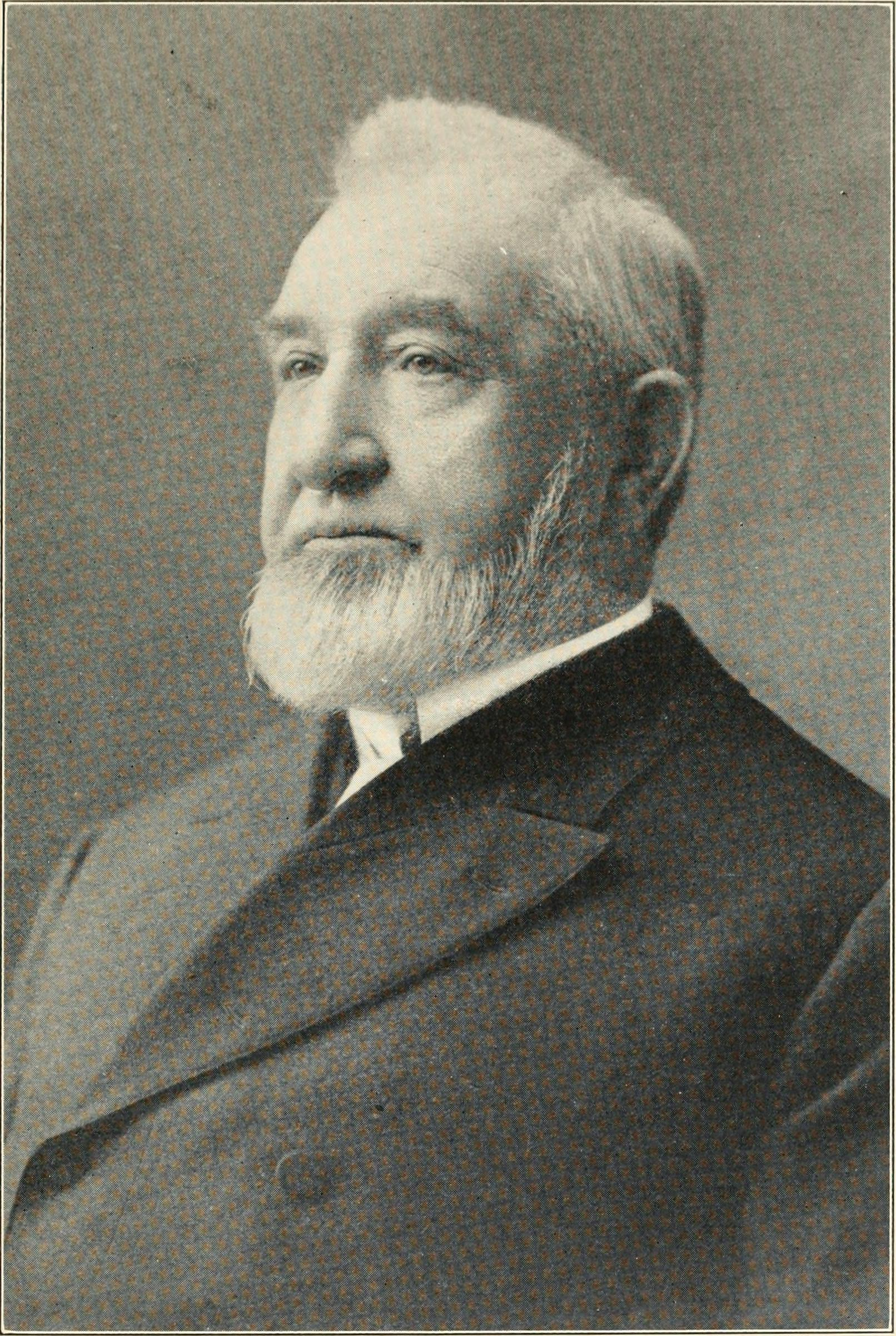
- Captain James D. M. Beebe
- Born: James Dean Monroe Beebe; August 1, 1827; New York City, US
- Died: September 18, 1917 (aged 90); Brooklyn, New York, US
- Occupation: harbor pilot
- Known for: Sandy Hook pilot for 55 years
- Spouse: Elizabeth J. Sweeney
- Children: 5

James Dean Monroe Beebe (August 1, 1827 – September 18, 1917) was a 19th-century American Sandy Hook Pilot. He is known for being the oldest Sandy Hook-New Jersey pilot, having served for 55 years as a Sandy Hook pilot. He organized the New Jersey Sandy Hook Pilots Association.

== Early life ==
Beebe was born in New York City on August 1, 1827. He was the son of Theophilus Beebe and Elizabeth Van Gelder. Beebe left New London with his parents when he as young and came to Long Branch, New Jersey, where he lived for over thirty years. He then moved to Brooklyn where he lived for 22 years.

== Career ==
Beebe moved to Brooklyn in 1848 and was licensed as a pilot in 1850. He was a part-owner of the pilot boat David T. Leahy, that was launched on September 4, 1890, witnessed by fifteen hundred people at the shipyards of C & R Poillon.

Beebe served as a boat pilot for fifty-five years. He organized the New Jersey-Sandy Hook Pilots' Association. He escaped several accidents including in 1865, when he was on the pilot boat Favorita, No. 5, that was sunk in a collision with the City of Port-au-Prince; and the Blizzard of 1888 while working with his son, when he was shipwrecked.

He retired from the Sandy Hook service in 1907.

Three score of hardy, ruddy cheeked men, all with a deep sea, blue water flavor about them, gathered in the cafe of the Battery Park Building last evening to do honor to the dean of their craft, James D. M. Beebe, who throughout fifty venturesome years, has been actively engaged as a Sandy Hook pilot. Fifty years of what Governor Roosevelt would describe as strenuous life-the boarding of any sort of vessel in any sort of weather and the piloting of craft in or out, blow high or low, whether the sea line be blotted by fog or clear as far as a sail might fare.

== Death ==
Beebe died on September 18, 1917, at the age of 90.

== See also ==
- List of pilot boats and pilots.
