= New York (pilot boat) =

New York, pilot boat

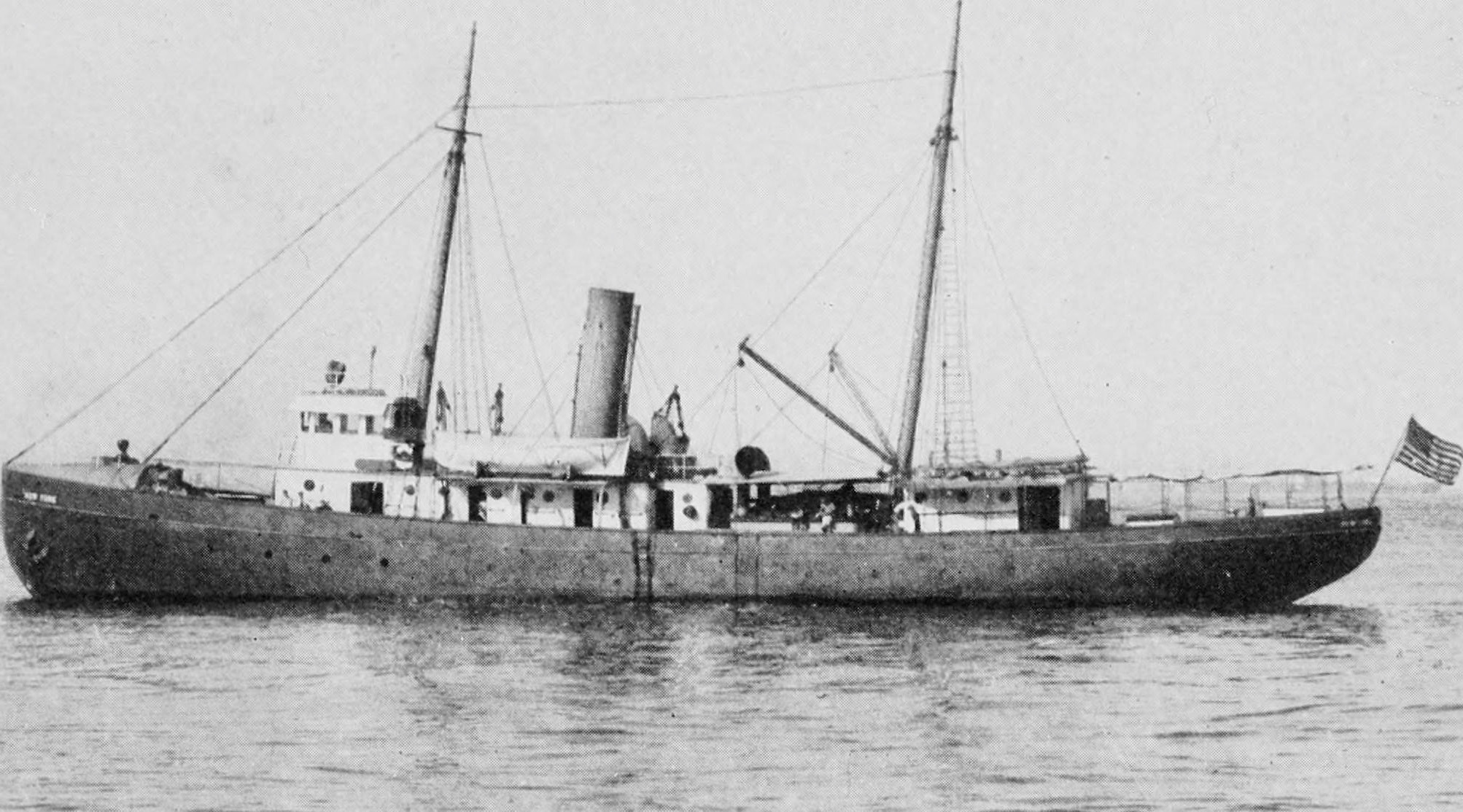
- First Steam Pilot Boat New York, built for Sandy Hook Pilots Association.

History

United States
- Name: New York
- Namesake: New York City
- Owner: New York Pilots
- Operator: James E. McCarthy, Jr.
- Builder: Harlan and Hollingsworth Company
- Cost: $32,000
- Launched: 18 March 1897
- Fate: Retired

General characteristics
- Class & type: schooner
- Length: 155 ft 0 in (47.24 m)
- Beam: 28 ft 0 in (8.53 m)
- Draft: 13 ft 0 in (3.96 m)
- Depth: 19 ft 0 in (5.79 m)
- Propulsion: Sail and steam motor
- Notes: Two working yawls on deck with hoisting engines.

New York was the first steam pilot boat in the New York Harbor. She was built in 1897, by the Harlan and Hollingsworth company at Wilmington, Delaware for the a group of New York Sandy Hook pilots. She was designed by Archibald Cary Smith, who was a prominent naval architect and marine engineer. The New York was retired from pilot service in 1951.

== Construction and service ==
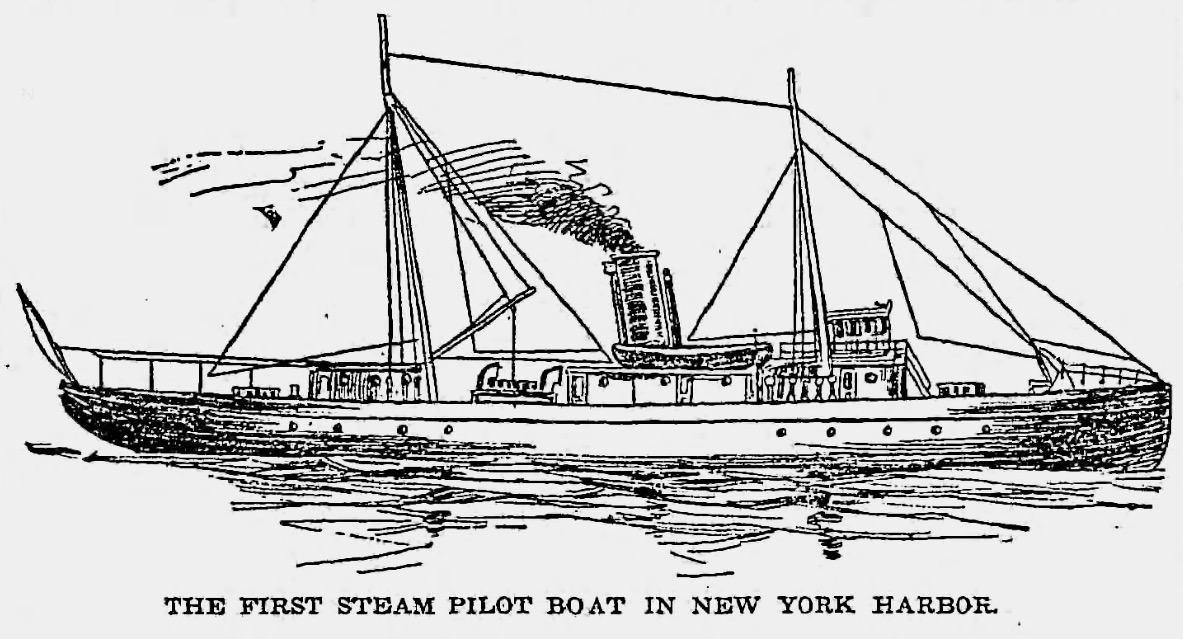
First Steam Pilot Boat New York.

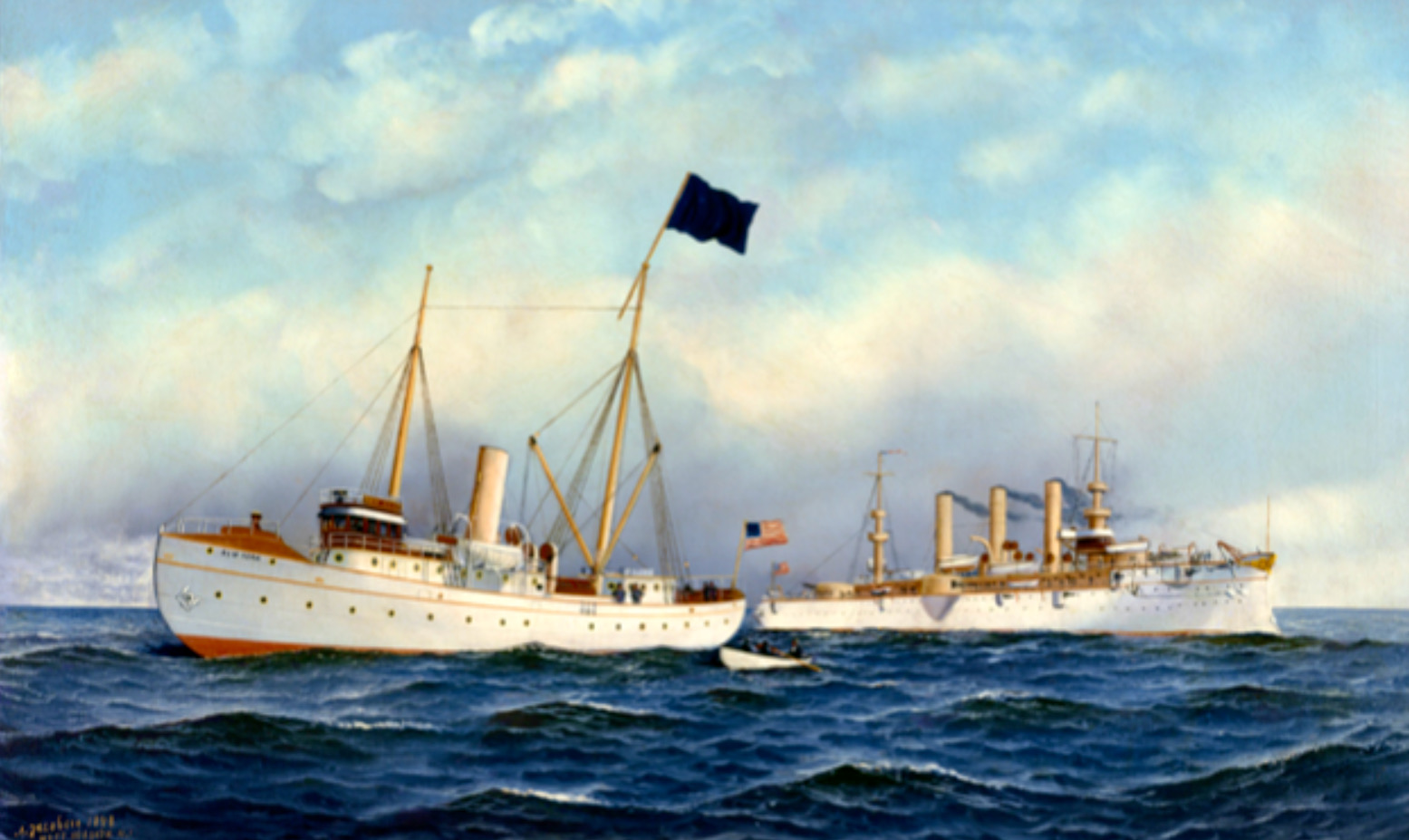
Pilot Boat New York with US Cruiser Brooklyn.

The pilot service in New York City changed with the introduction of steam pilot boats. The New York, was the first steam coal-burning pilot boat in the New York Harbor.

The New York was built in 1897, for the Sandy Hook Pilots Association by the Harlan and Hollingsworth Company at Wilmington, Delaware. She was designed by Archibald Cary Smith. Her dimensions were 155 ft. in length; 28 ft. breadth of beam; 19.7 ft. in depth; 13 ft. mean draft; and made of steel. She was built with an 800-horsepower engine.

She was launched on 18 March 1897, at the Harlan & Hollingsworth Company, with a large number of New York and New Jersey pilots and their families in attendance. She was sponsored by Marie Morse, daughter of the President of the Harlan & Hollingsworth Company. The New York could carry sixteen pilots and a crew of a captain, three mates, three engineers, a steward, a cook, two waiters, four firemen, and six sailors.

On 22 June 1897, the new steam pilot-boat New York went on her trial trip. The code signals "C, Q, F, P," meaning Allow Me To Congratulate You, were flying from the Sandy Hook Lightship as she passed by. On board were dignitaries from the Pilot Commissioners Office, Chamber of Commerce, Maritime Exchange, etc. She cost $32,000.

On 19 Mar 1898, the New York Pilot Commissioners decided to place the steam pilot boat New York into the Governments' auxiliary war fleet.

James E. McCarthy Jr., of Brooklyn, was a captain on the pilot-boat New York. On 18 December 1929, he rescued passengers on the Furness Bermuda Line Fort Worth, that sank in a collision near Ambrose Lightship.

In 1931, in place of what was once thirty pilot boats, there were only three steam pilot boats remaining in the pilot fleet, the Trenton, the New York, and the Sandy Hook.

== End of service ==
On 12 May 1951, the pilot boat New York was retired from pilot service. She was berthed at Pier 18 at Staten Island. She had been in service for 54 years. The new 206-foot boat, will take the name New York. She was once a yacht called the Nakhoda, rebuilt for pilot service at the Staten Island shipyard.

== Earlier New York pilot boats ==
There are reports of an earlier pilot-boat New York, that are listed in several prominent newspapers from 1840 and later. One listed in the New York Daily Herald, has the New York, No. 3, as one of eight pilot boats afloat.

On 14 December 1840, Robert W. Johnson, of the pilot boat New York, along with other pilots from the port of New York, stated that they had never been employed by J. D. Stevenson and no compensation has been offered or demanded.

Pilot Captain Henry Seguine did his apprenticeship on the pilot boat New York in 1857.

== See also ==
- List of Northeastern U. S. Pilot Boats
