= Sandy Hook Pilots Association =

Association of pilots

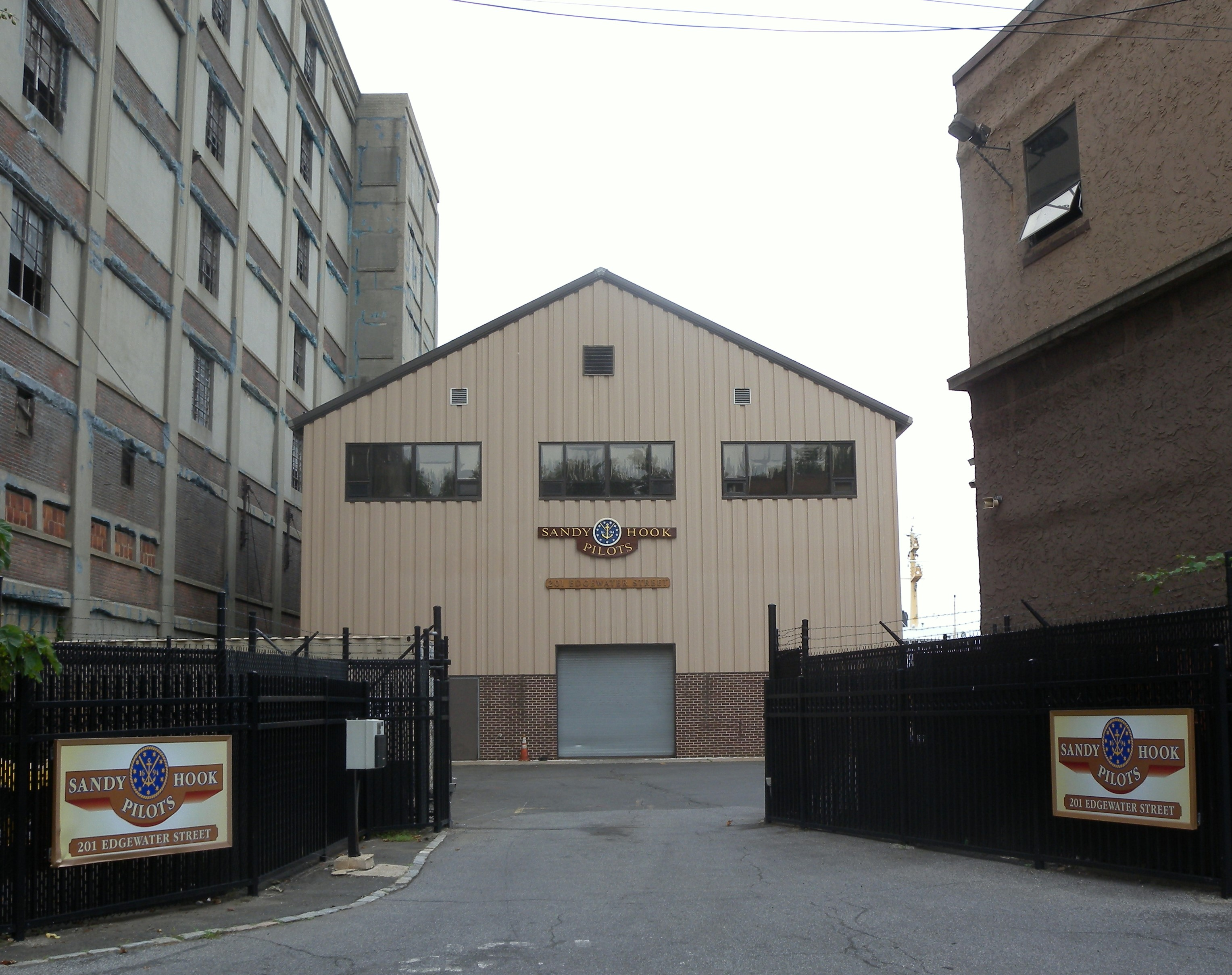
- Sandy Hook Pilots Association building on Staten Island.

- Location within New York Location within the United States
- Formation: December 1895
- Founder: Paul Goodrich, John Phelan, Daniel Gillesple, Thomas Dougherty, George W. Beebe, and Henry Seguine
- Founded at: Brooklyn, New York
- Headquarters: 201 Edgewater Street
- Location: Staten Island, New York, USA
- Coordinates: 40°37′2″N 74°3′56″W
- Region served: New York and New Jersey
- Services: Piloting
- Official language: English
- Leader: Captain John Decruz
- Website: Sandy Hook Pilots Association

Sandy Hook Pilots Association (also known as United New York & New Jersey Sandy Hook Pilots' Association) is in Staten Island, New York, United States. The Association provides pilotage services to all foreign flag vessels and American vessels entering or departing the Port of New York and New Jersey, the Hudson River, the East River, Atlantic City, New Jersey, Jamaica Bay, and Long Island Sound as required by state law. Pilotage is provided on a 24-hour basis, 365 days of the year in all weather conditions and port circumstances. It has 50 employees across its locations and generates $7.15 million in sales (USD).

== History ==
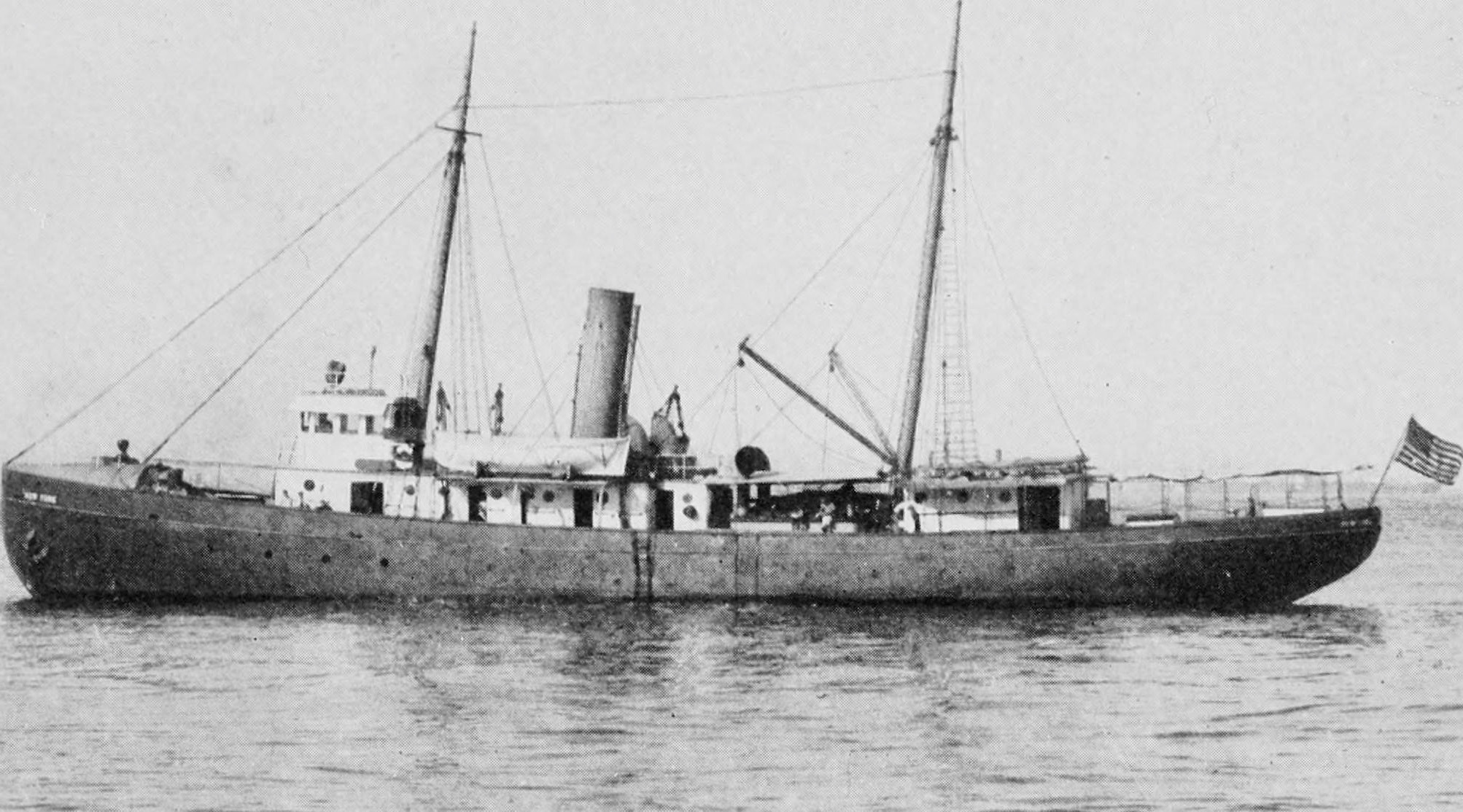
First Steam Pilot Boat New York, built for Sandy Hook Pilots' Association.

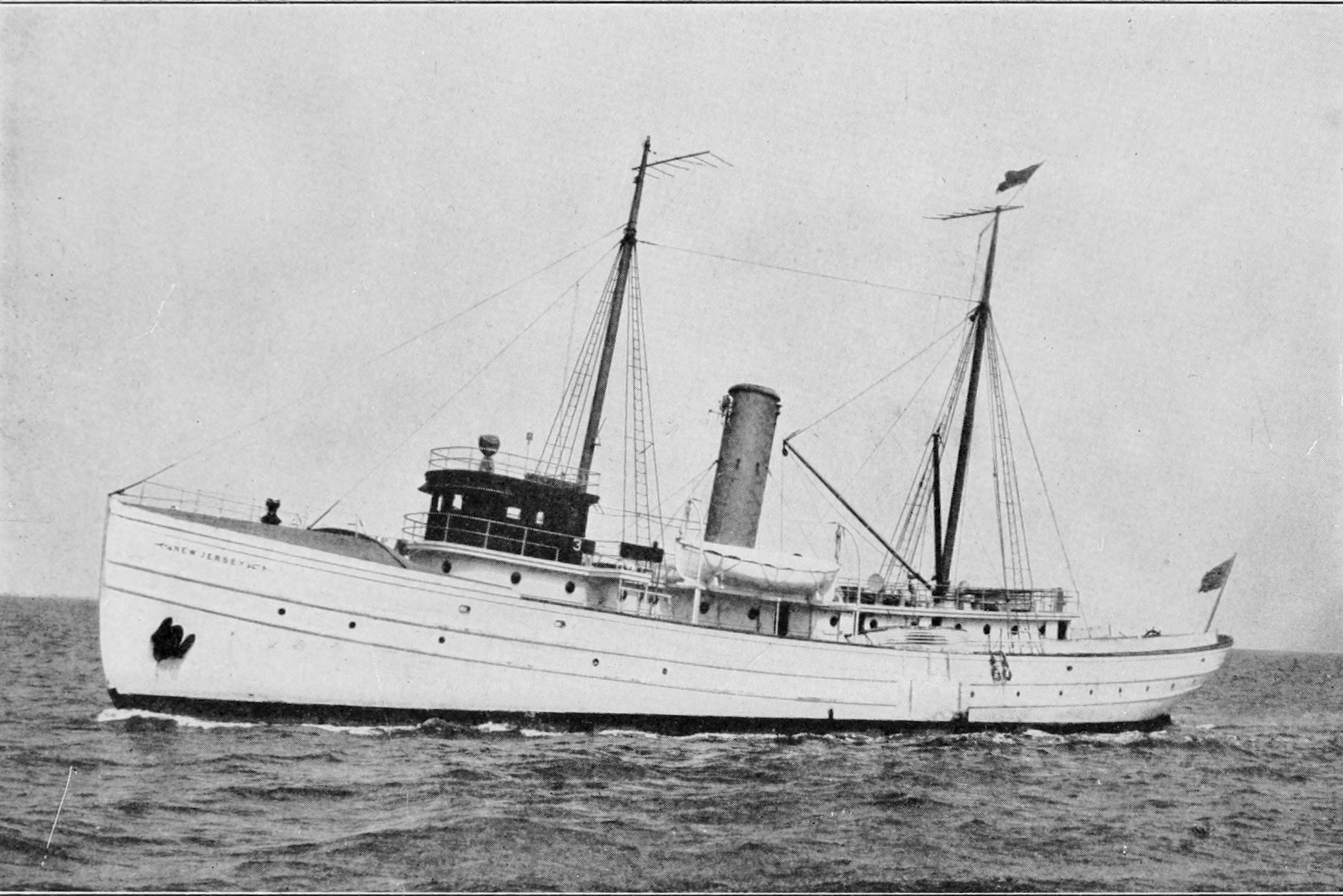
Steam Pilot Boat New Jersey, built for New York and New Jersey Pilots' Association.

The "United New York Sandy Hook Pilot Association" was incorporated in December 1895 for the construction, buying, selling, and chartering of Pilot boats. The capital was $105,000 and directors were Paul Goodrich, John Phelan, Daniel Gillesple, Thomas Dougherty, George W. Beebe, and Henry Seguine. The New York and New Jersey pilots were brought together into a new association. The association purchased all the pilot boats.

The New York and New Jersey organizations were consolidated into a new organization called the United New York and New Jersey Pilots Association. Any rivalry between the two organizations came to an end. The association purchased thirty pilot boats at fair prices from the Sandy Hook Pilots. It took eight years to make the new system work well and become profitable.

On June 2, 1897, the steam pilot boat New York was built directly for the Sandy Hook Pilots' Association by shipbuilder Harlan and Hollingsworth. She could accommodate twenty-four pilots. In May 1902, the steam pilot-boat New Jersey was built for the New York and New Jersey Pilots' Association by A. C. Brown & Sons of Tottenville, Staten Island. The Pilots' Association replaced the New Jersey with the Sandy Hook when she was sunk by the steamship SS Manchioneal in 1914.

In 1903, Frank P. Van Pelt was secretary and superintendent of the New York and New Jersey Sandy Hook Pilots' Association. By August 24, 1922, Van Pelt became President of the Pilots' Association and chairman of the executive committee of the New York and New Jersey Pilots Associations.

On September 13, 1907, the new steamship RMS Lusitania arrived in New York on her maiden voyage. Pilot Frank Kramer, of the Sandy Hook Pilots' Association, brought the Lusitania through the shipping Ambrose Channel of the Port of New York and New Jersey.

== See also ==
- Pilots' Association For The Bay & River Delaware
- List of Northeastern U. S. Pilot Boats
