= Lightship Ambrose =

Vessel formerly tasked with lighting a ship channel into New York Harbor

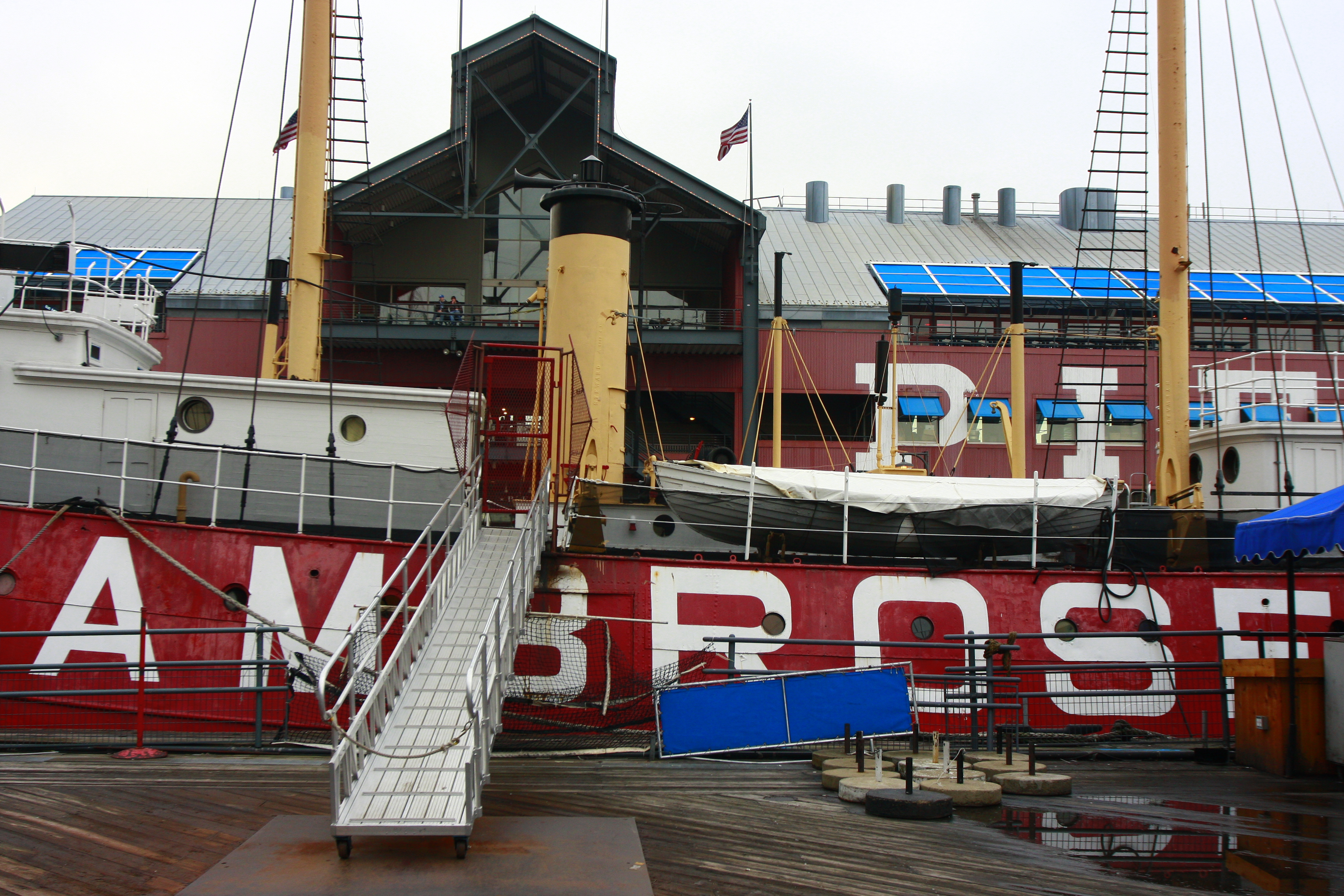
The Lightship Ambrose (LV87) is open to visitors at the South Street Seaport.

Lightship Ambrose was the name given to multiple lightships that served as the sentinel beacon marking Ambrose Channel, New York Harbor's main shipping channel.

The first lightstation was established south of the Ambrose Channel off of Sandy Hook, New Jersey, in 1823. From 1823 through 1967, several ships served the Ambrose Channel station; each was referred to as Lightship Ambrose and bore the station's name being painted on her side. In 1906, the lightship serving this station was relocated closer to the center of the Ambrose Channel. On 24 August 1967, the Ambrose station lightship was replaced by a Texas Tower, the Ambrose Light.

== United States Lightship LV-16 (Sandy Hook) ==
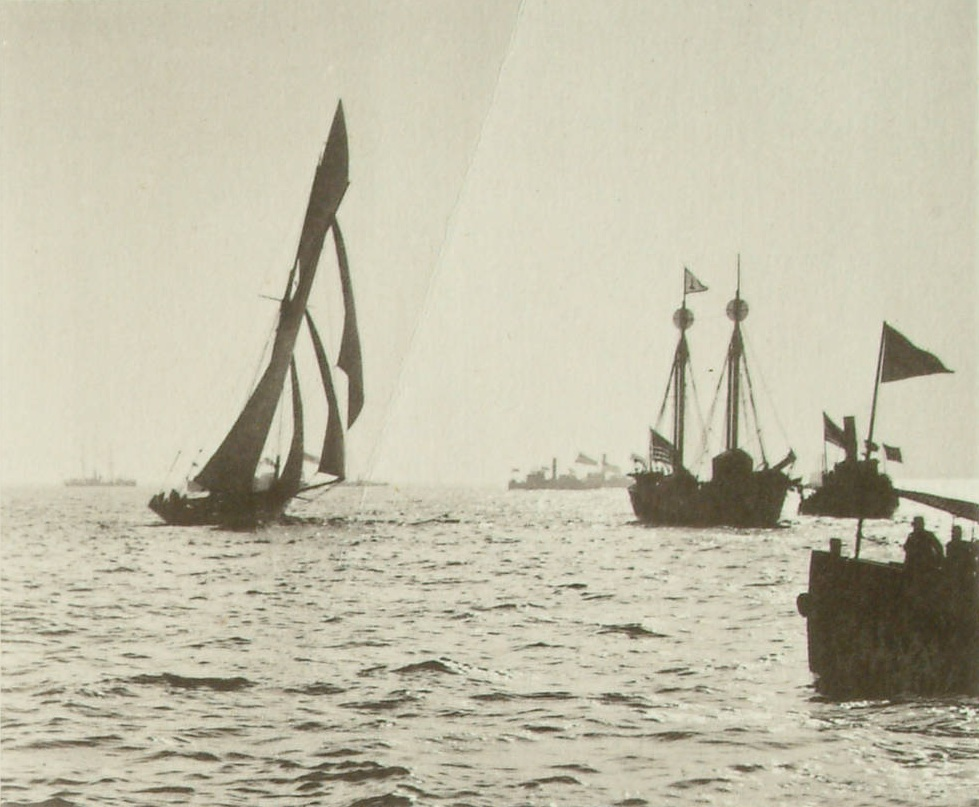
LV-16 served as a mark in the 1887 America's Cup race.

The first lightship on station in the Ambrose Channel was the Sandy Hook, which marked its south edge for 37 years from 1854 to 1891. A schooner built of white oak with copper and brass fastenings, she was assigned the number 16 in 1862. The ship was equipped with two lanterns, each with eight oil lamps and reflectors, as well as a hand-rung bell for a fog warning. A Thiers automatic bilge pump, ventilator, and fog signal were installed in 1872, but the fog signal was found to be "unsatisfactory" and was removed. Two collisions were recorded during her time in service, the first in 1874 with the steamer Charleston, and the second in 1888 with the British barque Star of the East.

== United States Lightship LV-51 (Sandy Hook) ==
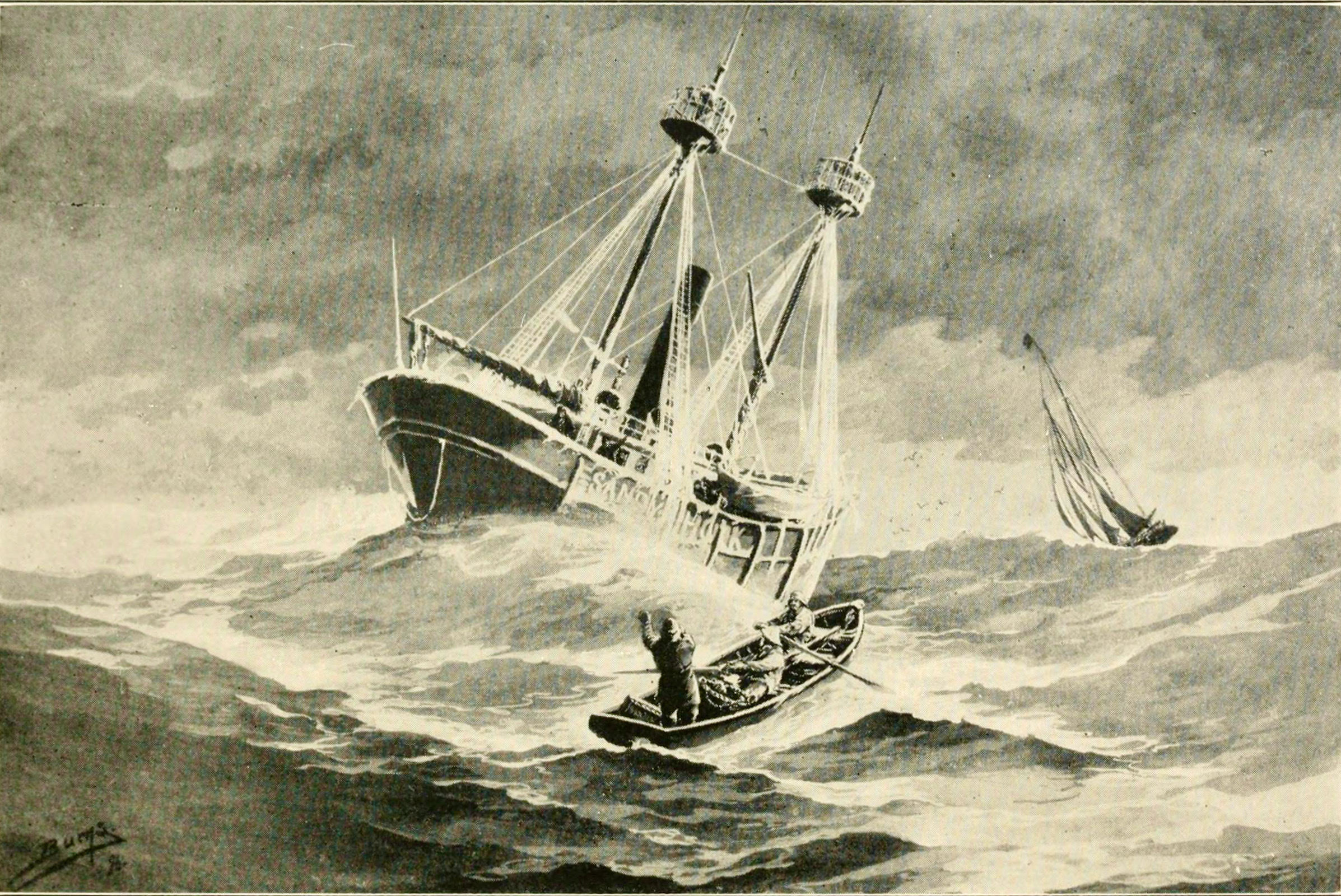
Sandy Hook Lightship

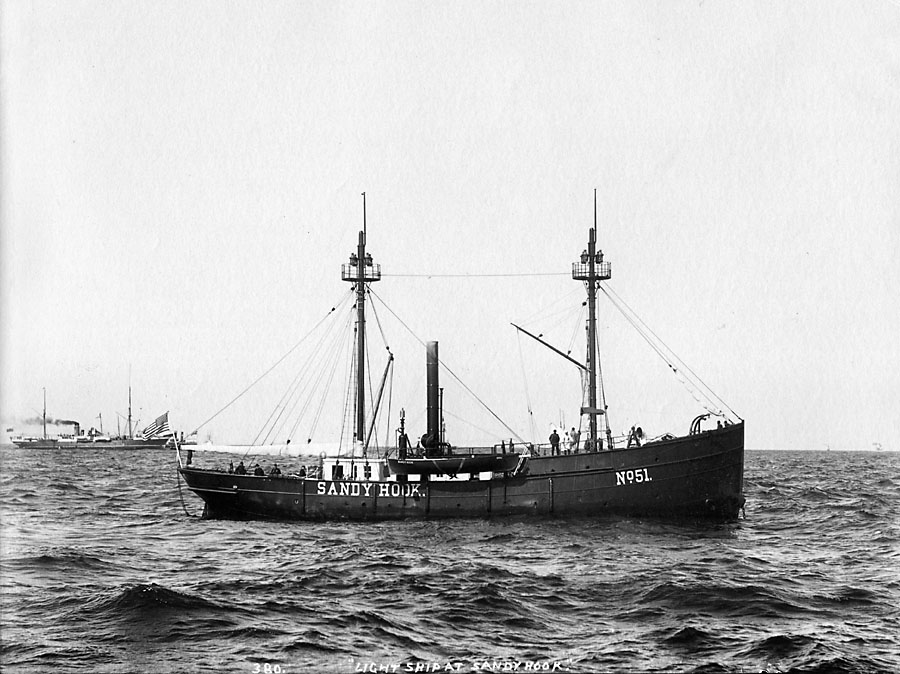
Sandy Hook (LV 51) in the late 1890s

Lightship Sandy Hook (LV-51) was built in 1892 and served the post from 1894 to 1908. She was renamed Ambrose Lightship in 1907. Pilots would deliver mail to the vessel.

A steamship, she was the first U.S. lightship to have an all-steel hull and fastenings, and the first to use electric lights; she was also the last ship to hold the post on the southern side of the channel, near Sandy Hook. After 1908, she was reassigned to relief duty. On 24 April 1919, she was rammed and sunk by a Standard Oil barge while relieving the Cornfield Point Lightship (LV-14). As a result of this incident, Standard Oil was forced to pay for the construction of LV111, which served as the Lightship Ambrose from 1932 to 1952.

== United States Lightship LV-87 / WAL-512 (Ambrose Channel / Ambrose) ==
The Lightship Ambrose (LV87) was built 1908 and served her station until 1932, when she was reassigned to serve as the Lightship Scotland much closer to Sandy Hook. She was the first lightship to serve in the relocated position nearer the center of the channel, and in 1921 received the first radio beacon in the United States, greatly assisting navigation of the congested channel in dense fog. She also was the last steam-powered vessel to hold this post. She moved around to various stations, but has kept the name of her most famous station, Ambrose.

In 1964, she was retired from the United States Coast Guard, and in 1968, she was given to the South Street Seaport Museum in Lower Manhattan in New York City and moored at Pier 16 on the East River. In 1989, she was declared a National Historic Landmark.

== United States Lightship LV-111 / WAL-533 (Ambrose) ==
Lightship Ambrose (LV111) staffed the station from 1932 to 1952, a period of time encompassing all of World War II. She was the first diesel-powered ship to mark the Ambrose Channel. Although the station was active throughout World War II, Ambrose was never armed, but did gain a radar in 1945.

Ambrose was involved in a number of collisions. In September 1935, she was rammed by the Grace Liner Santa Barbara, with both ships sustaining heavy damage. In January 1950, she was "brushed" in heavy fog by an unidentified vessel, suffering damage to her radio antenna and losing her spare anchor. Eleven weeks later, in March 1950, Santa Monica, another Grace Line vessel, rammed Ambrose in a dense fog, rupturing her hull. She was later repaired, and redeployed to Portland, Maine. Retired from lightship duty in 1969, she passed through several owners before being sold for scrap in 1984.

== United States Lightship WLV-613 (Ambrose) ==
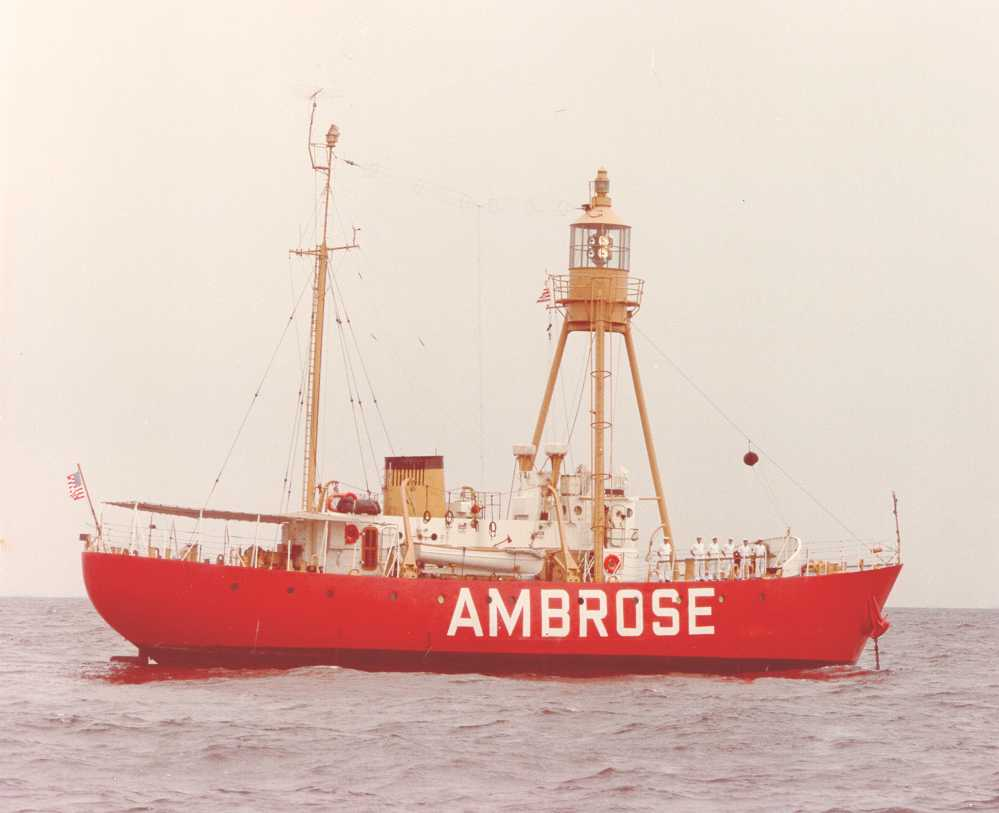
Lightship WLV-613

The Lightship Ambrose (WLV-613) was commissioned in 1952 and became the last lightship to mark the Ambrose Channel when she was replaced by a Texas Tower lightstation on 24 August 1967. She was reassigned as a relief ship on the Massachusetts coastline from 1967 to 1975. After being renamed Relief (1967 to 1980) and then Nantucket II (1980 to 1983), she was reassigned to Nantucket Shoals. She alternated with her sister ship, the Lightship Nantucket (WLV-612), on station, relieving each other approximately every 21 days, and was retired in 1983 after 31 years of service. WLV-613 had various assignments following her retirement including use in public relation events and law enforcement missions. She was sold to New England Historic Seaport on 7 July 1984 and was present for the rededication ceremony for the Statue of Liberty in 1986. By 2006 she had been sold to the Wareham Steamship Corporation and was berthed on Main Street in Wareham, Massachusetts.
