= List of shipwrecks in August 1864 =

The list of shipwrecks in August 1864 includes ships sunk, foundered, grounded, or otherwise lost during August 1864.

== 1 August ==
List of shipwrecks: 1 August 1864
Ship	State	Description
Rapid	United Kingdom	The ship foundered off the Copeland Islands, County Down. Her crew were rescued. She was on a voyage from Beaumaris, Anglesey to Alnmouth, Northumberland.
Sedulous	Norway	The barque was driven from her moorings and severely damaged at South Shields, County Durham, United Kingdom.

== 2 August ==
List of shipwrecks: 2 August 1864
Ship	State	Description
HMS Albacore	Royal Navy	The Albacore-class gunboat was driven ashore on the Isle of Wight. She was refloated and returned to service.
Henry Volant	United Kingdom	The ship was driven ashore near Westport, County Mayo. She was on a voyage from Westport to Gloucester.
Joseph Rowan	United Kingdom	The ship ran aground on the Pluckington Bank, in Liverpool Bay. She was on a voyage from Baltimore, Maryland, to Liverpool, Lancashire. She was refloated.
Lady Walton	United States	The 150-ton sternwheel paddle steamer collided with Norman (Flag unknown) and sank in the Tippecanoe River at Warsaw, Indiana.

== 3 August ==
List of shipwrecks: 3 August 1864
Ship	State	Description
Acadia	United Kingdom	The ship was driven ashore at Tynemouth, Northumberland. She was on a voyage from Quebec City, Province of Canada, British North America to South Shields, County Durham. She was refloated and taken in to South Shields.
Dan Pollard	United States	The 77-ton sternwheel paddle steamer struck a snag and sank at Cairo, Illinois.

== 4 August ==
List of shipwrecks: 4 August 1864
Ship	State	Description
Ada, and Aracan	United Kingdom; France	The full-rigged ship Aracan collided with Ada and sank off Cape Horn, Chile with the loss of a crew member. Her crew were rescued by Ada. She was on a voyage from Havre de Grâce, Seine-Inférieure to Valparaíso, Chile. Ada was on a voyage from Liverpool, Lancashire to Callao, Peru. She was severely damaged and put in to Stanley, Falkland Islands in a leaky condition.
Aguila de los Andes, and Lazenie	Italy; France	Lazenie collided with Aguila de los Andes and foundered in the North Sea off the coast of Norfolk, United Kingdom with the loss of seven of her crew. Survivors were rescued by Aguila de los Andes and the galiot Magdalena (Netherlands). Lazenie was on a voyage from a Swedish port to Cherbourg, Seine-Inférieure. Aguila de los Andes was on a voyage from the River Tyne to Genoa. Severely damaged, she was towed in to London by the steamship May Queen (United Kingdom.
Ralston	United Kingdom	The full-rigged ship was wrecked near Nuevitas, Cuba. Her crew were rescued by the barque Windward (United Kingdom). Ralston was on a voyage from Cardiff, Glamorgan to Havana, Cuba.
Unnamed	Belgium	The fishing sloop foundered in the North Sea. Her crew survived.

== 5 August ==
List of shipwrecks: 5 August 1864
Ship	State	Description
Bellevue	United Kingdom	The schooner sprang a leak and foundered off Holy Isle, in the Firth of Clyde. Her three crew survived. She was on a voyage from Bowling, Dunbartonshire to Belfast, County Antrim.
Emulazione	Flag unknown	The ship was driven ashore and wrecked on Læsø, Denmark. She was on a voyage from Gallipoli, Ottoman Empire to Kronstadt, Russia.
CSS Gaines	Confederate States Navy	American Civil War, Battle of Mobile Bay: The sidewheel gunboat grounded in a sinking condition in Mobile Bay, Alabama, near Fort Morgan after suffering heavy damage, with two crew members killed.
USS Philippi	United States Navy	American Civil War, Battle of Mobile Bay: The sidewheel gunboat was set afire by Confederate artillery and sank in Mobile Bay, Alabama, (30°23′01″N 88°02′00″W) after suffering heavy damage.
Seafield	United Kingdom	The ship ran aground on the Pluckington Bank, in Liverpool Bay. She was on a voyage from Akyab, Burma to Liverpool, Lancashire. She was refloated and taken in to Liverpool.
USS Tecumseh	United States Navy	Illustration of USS Tecumseh sinking. American Civil War, Battle of Mobile Bay: The monitor sank in less than 30 seconds with the loss of 94 lives in Mobile Bay, Alabama, (30°13′54″N 88°01′33″W) after striking a Confederate mine.

== 6 August ==
List of shipwrecks: 6 August 1864
Ship	State	Description
Harmonic	Denmark	The schooner was wrecked in the Pescadores with the loss of all but four of her crew. She was on a voyage from Takao, Formosa to Shanghai, China.
Mary and Ann	United Kingdom	The ship ran aground and sprang a leak at Mistley, Essex. She was on a voyage from Goole, Yorkshire to Mistley.
Rambler	United Kingdom	The ship was driven ashore at Dungeness, Kent. She was on a voyage from London to Demerara, British Guiana. She was refloated with assistance and resumed her voyage.
Yanutha	(United Kingdom of Great Britain and Ireland) New Zealand	The 30-ton schooner went ashore at New Plymouth during a gale.
Zephyr	(United Kingdom of Great Britain and Ireland) New Zealand	The 56-ton schooner went ashore at New Plymouth during a gale.

== 7 August ==
List of shipwrecks: 7 August 1864
Ship	State	Description
Carracoa	United Kingdom	The ship departed from "Locopilla", on the west coast of Africa for Swansea, Glamorgan. No further trace, presumed foundered with the loss of all hands.
Charles Mears	United States	The 272-ton screw steamer burned at Muskegon, Michigan.
Chekiang	United States	The 1,264-ton sidewheel paddle steamer burned at Hankow, China.
Laurel	United Kingdom	The schooner ran aground at Rønne, Denmark. She was on a voyage from Saint Petersburg, Russia to London. She was refloated and put in to "Hitte", Sweden in a leaky condition.
CSS Phoenix	Confederate States Navy	American Civil War: The ironclad warship was scuttled at the Dog River Bar in Mobile Bay, Alabama, (30.60231°N 88.03860°W) to prevent her capture by Union forces. A few nights later, men from the sidewheel gunboat USS Metacomet (United States Navy) blew up her wreck to prevent her from being salvaged by Confederate forces, after which Confederate forces burned her wreck to the waterline to prevent her salvage by Union forces.
Blue Bell, and Providence	United Kingdom	The sloop Providence collided with the pilot boat Blue Bell off Lavernock, Glamorgan. Providence foundered with the loss of five of the six people on board. she was on a voyage from Bristol, Gloucestershire to Minehead, Somerset. Blue Bell also foundered. All four people on board were rescued. She was on a voyage from Cardiff, Glamorgan to Lundy Island, Devon.
USS Violet	United States Navy	American Civil War: The armed tug ran aground on the Western Bar of North Carolina′s Cape Fear River. Her own crew and that of the gunboat USS Vicksburg (United States Navy) were unable to refloat her. To prevent her capture by Confederate forces, they destroyed her by detonating her gunpowder magazine early on 8 August.

== 8 August ==
List of shipwrecks: 8 August 1864
Ship	State	Description
Bruce	United Kingdom	The ship ran aground in the Rangapollen Channel. She was on a voyage from Calcutta, India to Liverpool, Lancashire. She was refloated and resumed her voyage.
Chekiang	United States	The schooner was destroyed by fire at Hankow, China.
Hilda	United Kingdom	The ship was beached in the Saguenay River. She was on a voyage from Chicoutimi, Province of Canada, British North America to Hull, Yorkshire.

== 9 August ==
List of shipwrecks: 9 August 1864
Ship	State	Description
Alma	United Kingdom	The barque was abandoned in the Atlantic Ocean 65 nautical miles (120 km) off Sydney, Nova Scotia, British North America. Her crew were rescued. She was on a voyage from the Clyde to Limerick and Montreal, Province of Canada, British North America.
Catharine	United Kingdom	The smack foundered off the Isle of Arran. Her crew were rescued. She was on a voyage from the Clyde to the Isle of Skye, Outer Hebrides.
J. C. Campbell	United States	American Civil War: The supply barge, carrying a cargo of commissary stores, was obliterated at her moorings at a wharf at City Point, Virginia, Confederate States of America by the explosion of the barge J. E. Kendrick (United States).
J. E. Kendrick	United States	Illustration by Alfred R. Waud of the explosion of J. E. Kendrick, published in Harper's Weekly on 27 August 1864. American Civil War: The supply barge was obliterated at her moorings at a wharf at City Point when a time bomb planted by a Confederate Secret Service Officer detonated on board, causing her cargo of ammunition to explode. The explosion killed 43 people and injured 126; some accounts put the death toll as high as 300.
Lewis	United States	American Civil War: The barge was blown up at City Point by the explosion of the barge J. E. Kendrick (United States).
Major General Meade	United States	American Civil War: The supply barge, carrying a cargo of condemned stores and condemned ammunition, was obliterated at her moorings at City Point by the explosion of the barge J. E. Kendrick (United States).
Mandarin	United States	The clipper was wrecked on a reef south of the Thousand Islands. All on board were rescued by the steamship Ambon ( Netherlands East Indies). Mandarin was on a voyage from Hong Kong to New York.
Prince Albert	Confederate States of America	American Civil War, Union blockade: The 132-Gross register ton screw steamer, a blockade runner carrying a cargo of lead ingots and medicine, struck the wreck of the screw steamer Minho (United Kingdom) while trying to enter Charleston Harbor at Charleston, South Carolina, Confederate States of America, and sank in shallow water on Drunken Dick Shoal on 8 or 9 August. Her wreck was set afire by shelling by the monitor USS Catskill (United States Navy) and Union artillery on Morris Island, and the fire completed her destruction.
Sultan	United Kingdom	The schooner sank in Liverpool Bay. Her five crew were rescued by the Liverpool Lifeboat. She was on a voyage from Lough Swilly to Liverpool, Lancashire.
Swallow	(United Kingdom of Great Britain and Ireland) New Zealand	The schooner ran aground on Te Haupa / Saddle Island, at the mouth of the Mahurangi River.

== 10 August ==
List of shipwrecks: 10 August 1864
Ship	State	Description
Alexandra	United Kingdom	The ship ran aground in the Clyde upstream of Dumbarton. She was on a voyage from Greenock, Renfrewshire to Porto, Portugal. She was refloated on 12 August and resumed her voyage.
Emperor, and Mary	United Kingdom	The schooner Mary was beached at New Brighton, Cheshire. Her crew were rescued by the tug Emperor, which ran aground.
Penguin	United Kingdom	The ship ran aground on the Goodwin Sands, Kent. She was on a voyage from Sunderland, County Durham to Odesa, Russia. She was refloated and taken in to Ramsgate, Kent.
Racine	United States	The 157-ton screw steamer burned at Rondeau, Province of Canada, British North America, killing thirteen people. Survivors were rescued by the tug Avon ( (United Kingdom of Great Britain and Ireland) British North America). Racine was on a voyage from Port Stanley, Province of Canada to Buffalo, New York.

== 11 August ==
List of shipwrecks: 11 August 1864
Ship	State	Description
A. Richards	United States	American Civil War: The 274-ton brig was captured and burned in the North Atlantic Ocean off Sandy Hook, New Jersey, by the merchant raider CSS Tallahassee (Confederate States Navy).
Bay State	United States	American Civil War: The 200-ton barque, carrying a cargo of wood from Alexandria, Virginia, Confederate States of America to New York City, was captured and burned in the North Atlantic Ocean off Sandy Hook, New Jersey, by the merchant raider CSS Tallahassee (Confederate States Navy).
Carrie Estelle	United States	American Civil War: The 218-ton brig or schooner, carrying a cargo of logs, was captured and burned in the North Atlantic Ocean about 80 nautical miles (150 km) off Sandy Hook by the merchant raider CSS Tallahassee (Confederate States Navy).
Czar	Russia	The steamship was driven ashore on "Narvoe". She was on a voyage from Kronstadt to Leith, Lothian, United Kingdom.
James Funk	United States	American Civil War: The 121-ton pilot boat was captured and burned in the North Atlantic Ocean off either Sandy Hook, or Montauk Point, Long Island, New York, by the merchant raider CSS Tallahassee (Confederate States Navy).
Janet	United Kingdom	The lighter, under tow of the tug Conquest (United Kingdom), collided with the steamship Alexandra (United Kingdom) and sank in the Clyde near Bowling, Dunbartonshire. Both crew were rescued.
Jules and Agloe	France	The barque struck a sunken rock at Buenos Aires, Argentina. She was consequently condemned.
Sarah A. Boyce	United States	American Civil War: The 382-ton schooner was captured and scuttled or burned in the North Atlantic Ocean 80 nautical miles (150 km) off Sandy Hook by the merchant raider CSS Tallahassee (Confederate States Navy).
William	United Kingdom	The full-rigged ship was driven ashore on Deer Island, Massachusetts, United States. She was on a voyage from Manzanilla, Trinidad to Boston, Massachusetts. She was refloated.
William Bell	United States	American Civil War: The pilot boat was captured and burned in the North Atlantic Ocean 90 nautical miles (170 km) east south east of Sandy Hook, or 35 nautical miles (65 km) south east of Fire Island, New York, by the merchant raider CSS Tallahassee (Confederate States Navy).

== 12 August ==
List of shipwrecks: 12 August 1864
Ship	State	Description
Adriatic	United States	American Civil War: During a voyage from London to New York with 170 emigrants aboard, the 989-ton full-rigged ship was captured and burned in the North Atlantic Ocean either off Sandy Hook, New Jersey, or 35 nautical miles (65 km) Montauk Point, Long Island, New York, by the merchant raider CSS Tallahassee (Confederate States Navy).
Atlantic	United States	American Civil War: During a voyage to New York City, the 156-ton schooner was captured and burned in the North Atlantic Ocean, either off Sandy Hook, or off the coast of New York by the merchant raider CSS Tallahassee (Confederate States Navy).
Lady Daly	United Kingdom	The barque was driven ashore on Langlade Island. Her crew were rescued. She was on a voyage from Saint John, New Brunswick, British North America to Cork. She had become a wreck by 23 August.
Spokane	United States	American Civil War: Carrying a cargo of lumber from Calais, France, to New York, the 126-ton schooner was captured and burned in the North Atlantic Ocean off Sandy Hook by the merchant raider CSS Tallahassee (Confederate States Navy).
Thebes	United Kingdom	The barque foundered in the Pacific Ocean (55°59′S 83°26′W). Her crew were rescued by the barque William Wilson (United Kingdom). Thebes was on a voyage from Deal, Kent to San Francisco, California.
Vsadnik (Всадник, 'Rider')	Imperial Russian Navy	The clipper was driven ashore at Gotska Sandön in the Baltic Sea with the loss of 15 of her 102 crew. She was refloated on 1 September and taken in to Kronstadt.
Wave	United Kingdom	The ship was driven ashore and wrecked at Percé, Province of Canada, British North America.
William and Mary	(United Kingdom of Great Britain and Ireland) British North America	The ship was wrecked at Bridgeport, Nova Scotia. Her crew were rescued. She was on a voyage from Bridgeport to New York.

== 13 August ==
List of shipwrecks: 13 August 1864
Ship	State	Description
Glenarvon, or Glenavon	United States	American Civil War: During a voyage from New York to Greenock, Renfrewshire, United Kingdom, with a cargo of iron, the 789-ton barque was captured and scuttled in the North Atlantic Ocean off Massachusetts by the merchant raider CSS Tallahassee (Confederate States Navy).
HMS Enterprise	Royal Navy	The ironclad ran aground. She was refloated.
Lamont Du Pont, or Lammont Du Pont	United States	American Civil War]: Carrying a cargo of coal from Cow Bay, Nova Scotia, British North America, to New York, the 194-ton schooner was captured and either scutlled or burned (sources disagree) in the North Atlantic Ocean within 60 nautical miles (110 km) of New York by the merchant raider CSS Tallahassee (Confederate States Navy).
Lotus	(United Kingdom of Great Britain and Ireland) New Zealand	The 90-ton schooner, loaded with timber from Taranaki, was lost trying to cross the bar at the mouth of the Kaipara Harbour in a heavy swell.
Marathon	United Kingdom	The ship was wrecked on the Krishna Shoal, 50 nautical miles (93 km) south of the Rangoon Lightship ( (United Kingdom of Great Britain and Ireland) Burma). Her crew were rescued. She was on a voyage from Rangoon, Burma to Falmouth, Cornwall or Queenstown, County Cork.
Prince Arthur	United Kingdom	The ship was wrecked on "Mansfield Island". All on board were rescued. She was on a voyage from London to Hudson Bay.

== 14 August ==
List of shipwrecks: 14 August 1864
Ship	State	Description
Gladiator	United States	The 425-ton sidewheel paddle steamer was stranded on the Mississippi River at Willard, Illinois.
James Littlefield	United States	American Civil War: The 547- or 593-ton full-rigged ship, carrying a cargo of anthracite from Cardiff, Glamorgan, United Kingdom, to New York, was captured and scuttled in the North Atlantic Ocean off the coast of Maine by the merchant raider CSS Tallahassee (Confederate States Navy).
Mearns	United States	The steamship caught fire in Lake Erie and was beached. She was severely damaged.

== 15 August ==
List of shipwrecks: 15 August 1864
Ship	State	Description
Etta Caroline	United States	American Civil War: Carrying a cargo of wood, the 39-ton fishing schooner was captured and scuttled in the North Atlantic Ocean off Maine by the merchant raider CSS Tallahassee (Confederate States Navy).
Floral Wreath	United States	American Civil War: The 54-ton schooner, bound from Bridgeport, Connecticut, to C. H. Island in Maine was captured and scuttled in the North Atlantic Ocean off Maine by the merchant raider CSS Tallahassee (Confederate States Navy).
Houqua	United States	The clipper departed from Yokohama, Japan for New York City, No further trace, presumed foundered with the loss of all hands. She may have foundered in a typhoon.
Howard	United States	American Civil War: The 148-ton schooner, bound from Bridgeport, Nova Scotia, British North America, to New York City with a cargo of coal, was captured and scuttled in the North Atlantic Ocean off Maine by the merchant raider CSS Tallahassee (Confederate States Navy).
Mary A. Howes	United States	American Civil War: The 61-ton schooner was captured and scuttled in the North Atlantic Ocean off Maine by the merchant raider CSS Tallahassee (Confederate States Navy).
Perseverance	United Kingdom	The ship was driven ashore in the Dardanelles. She was on a voyage from Fowey, Cornwall to Constantinople, Ottoman Empire. She was refloated with the assistance of a tug.
Restless	United States	American Civil War: The 50-ton fishing schooner was captured and scuttled in the North Atlantic Ocean off New England by the merchant raider CSS Tallahassee (Confederate States Navy).
Wee Tottie	(United Kingdom of Great Britain and Ireland) New Zealand	The brig went aground at New Plymouth. She had discharged her cargo at the port, but had not taken on enough ballast and became unmanageable.

== 16 August ==
List of shipwrecks: 16 August 1864
Ship	State	Description
Ceres	Norway	The ship collided with USS Sacramento (United States Navy) and was abandoned in the English Channel 9 nautical miles (17 km) south south west of Plymouth, Devon, United Kingdom. Her crew were rescued by USS Sacramento. Ceres was on a voyage from Seville, Spain to Helsingør, Denmark. She was towed in to Plymouth on 18 August.
Cora	United Kingdom	The barque was driven ashore on Rathlin Island, County Donegal. She was on a voyage from Greenock, Renfrewshire to Cuba. She was refloated and put back to Greenock.
Hortensia	United Kingdom	The ship was driven ashore in the Ems. She was on a voyage from Newcastle upon Tyne, Northumberland to Hamburg. She was refloated on 18 August and taken in to Delfzijl, Groningen, Netherlands for repairs.
Leopard	United States	American Civil War: The 74-ton schooner, carrying a cargo of wood to Boston, Massachusetts, was captured and burned in the North Atlantic Ocean off Maine by the merchant raider CSS Tallahassee (Confederate States Navy).
Magnolia	United States	American Civil War: The 35-ton fishing schooner was captured and burned in the North Atlantic Ocean off Maine by the merchant raider CSS Tallahassee (Confederate States Navy).
Oak	United Kingdom	The brig sank off the mouth of the Uggerby Å. Her crew were rescued by the Hjorning Lifeboat. She was on a voyage from Newcastle upon Tyne to Kronstadt, Russia.
P. C. Alexander	United States	American Civil War: The 283-ton barque, on a voyage in ballast from New York to Pictou, Nova Scotia, British North America, was captured and burned in the North Atlantic Ocean off Maine by the merchant raider CSS Tallahassee (Confederate States Navy).
Pearl	United States	American Civil War: The 42-ton fishing schooner was captured and burned in the North Atlantic Ocean off Maine by the merchant raider CSS Tallahassee (Confederate States Navy).
Sarah Louise	United States	American Civil War: Carrying a cargo of wood, the 81-ton schooner was captured and burned in the North Atlantic Ocean off Maine by the merchant raider CSS Tallahassee (Confederate States Navy).
Stolp	Stolp	The brig was driven ashore east of Stolpemünde, Prussia. She was refloated on 26 September and taken in to Stolp.
William Pearson	United Kingdom	The ship was wrecked on the Wolvers.

== 17 August ==
List of shipwrecks: 17 August 1864
Ship	State	Description
Frederick Huth	United Kingdom	The brig was driven ashore at Dragør, Denmark. She was on a voyage from Riga, Russia to South Shields, County Durham.
Frodsham	United Kingdom	The schooner ran aground at Cemaes Bay, Anglesey. She was on a voyage from Liverpool, Lancashire to Cemaes Bay. She was refloated.
Johanna Hepner	Prussia	The brig was driven ashore at Hela. She was on a voyage from Danzig to Guernsey, Channel Islands.
Josiah Achom	United States	American Civil War: The 123-ton schooner, on a voyage in ballast from Portland, to Lingan, Nova Scotia, British North America, was captured and destroyed in the North Atlantic Ocean off Maine by the merchant raider CSS Tallahassee (Confederate States Navy).
Miller (or J. H. Miller)	United States	American Civil War: The 68-ton sternwheel paddle steamer, carrying a cargo of commissary supplies and mail, was captured and burned by Confederate forces on the Arkansas River 20 nautical miles (37 km) from Pine Bluff, Arkansas.
National	United States	The steamship was wrecked at Matamoros, Mexico.
North America	United States	American Civil War: The 87-ton fishing schooner was captured and scuttled in the North Atlantic Ocean off Maine by the merchant raider CSS Tallahassee (Confederate States Navy).
Speculation	United Kingdom	The brig sprang a leak and foundered in the North Sea off the coast of Jutland. Her crew survived. She was on a voyage from Sunderland, County Durham to Swinemünde, Prussia.
Venture	United Kingdom	The schooner was driven ashore at Hopeman, Moray. She was on a voyage from Stonehaven, Aberdeenshire to Hopeman. She was refloated and taken in to Hopeman, where she sank. Her crew were rescued.

== 18 August ==
List of shipwrecks: 18 August 1864
Ship	State	Description
Empress Eugenie	United Kingdom	The ship departed from Singapore, Straits Settlements for Whampoa, China. No further trace, presumed foundered with the loss of all hands.
George Clark	United Kingdom	The brig was run into by the steamship Virginia (Confederate States of America) and sank in the Thames Estuary off Shell Haven, Essex. Her eight crew were rescued by Virginia. George Clark was on a voyage from London to Riga, Russia. She had been refloated by early September and beached.
Highland Chief	United States	The 342-ton sternwheel paddle steamer sank in the Ohio River 2 miles (3.2 km) above Vevay, Indiana, with the loss of five lives after colliding with Major Anderson (Flag unknown).
Patrician	Italy	The full-rigged ship was driven ashore near the Cape Rosier Lighthouse, Maine, United States. She was on a voyage from Genoa to Quebec City, Province of Canada, British North America. She was refloated with the assistance of the tug Hector (United Kingdom) and resumed her voyage.
Olympus	United Kingdom	The steamship caught fire in the Mediterranean Sea. She was on a voyage from Liverpool, Lancashire to the Levant. She put in to Malta and the fire was extinguished.

== 19 August ==
List of shipwrecks: 19 August 1864
Ship	State	Description
Cormorant	United Kingdom	The steamship sprang a leak and was beached at Falmouth, Cornwall. She was on a voyage from Cork to London.
Eliza	United Kingdom	The schooner ran aground on the Margate Sands, off the coast of Kent. She was on a voyage from Newcastle upon Tyne, Northumberland to Fowey, Cornwall. She was refloated with the assistance of the lifeboat Friend to all Nations (United Kingdom) and taken in to Margate in a leaky condition.
James Smith	United Kingdom	The steamship was driven ashore and wrecked at Cape Henlopen, Delaware, United States. She was on a voyage from Liverpool, Lancashire to Philadelphia, Pennsylvania, United States.
No. 40	United Kingdom	The Scotch boat was driven ashore and severely damaged at Whitby, Yorkshire. She was refloated and taken in to Whitby.

== 20 August ==
List of shipwrecks: 20 August 1864
Ship	State	Description
Asheen	United Kingdom	The schooner was discovered in a derelict condition 30 nautical miles (56 km) off Spurn Point, Yorkshire by the smack British Hero (United Kingdom). She was towed in to Hull, Yorkshire.
Danish Princess	United Kingdom	The ship was driven ashore at São José da Coroa Grande, Brazil. She was on a voyage from Liverpool, Lancashire to Maranhão, Brazil. She was refloated and taken in to Maranhāo, where she arrived the next day.
Fleetwing	United States	The schooner was lost in the Bay of St. Lawrence. Crew saved.
Inkerman	United Kingdom	The full-rigged ship was driven ashore at Calcutta, India. She had been refloated by 23 August.
Roan	United States	American Civil War: The 127-ton brig was captured and burned in the North Atlantic Ocean south of Halifax, Nova Scotia, British North America, by the merchant raider CSS Tallahassee (Confederate States Navy).
Sendiah	Imperial Russian Navy	The steamship was wrecked at "Uando" with the loss of 23 of her crew.
Wave	United Kingdom	The schooner was wrecked at Quebec City, Province of Canada, British North America. Her crew were rescued.
Williams	United Kingdom	The schooner collided with the steamship Grange (United Kingdom) and sank in the North Sea 5 nautical miles (9.3 km) off St. Abbs Head, Berwickshire. Her three crew were rescued by Grange.

== 21 August ==
List of shipwrecks: 21 August 1864
Ship	State	Description
Archeveque Schour	France	The schooner struck a sunken rock and foundered off Ouessant, Finistère. She was on a voyage from the Clyde to Gijón, Spain.
Aurora	United Kingdom	The full-rigged ship ran aground on the Outer Middle Ground, off the coast of New York, United States. She was on a voyage from Liverpool, Lancashire to New York City. She was refloated and completed her voyage.
Ensign	United Kingdom	The barque was damaged by fire at Sunderland, County Durham.
Raven	United Kingdom	The ship was struck by lightning and set on fire off Winterton-on-Sea, Norfolk. She was on a voyage from London to the River Tyne. She put in to Great Yarmouth, Norfolk.
Robert and Mary	United Kingdom	The brig was driven ashore on Sjælland, Denmark in a capsized condition and was wrecked. She was on a voyage from Riga, Russia to London.
Torrance	United Kingdom	The ship ran aground on the Hats and Barrels Rocks, in the Bristol Channel. She was on a voyage from Londonderry to Cardiff, Glamorgan. She was refloated and put in to Milford Haven, Pembrokeshire in a leaky condition.

== 22 August ==
List of shipwrecks: 22 August 1864
Ship	State	Description
Arrica	Italy	The ship was driven ashore near Penarth Head, Glamorgan, United Kingdom. She was on a voyage from Genoa to Cardiff, Glamorgan.
Blue Bell	United Kingdom	The ship departed from Newcastle upon Tyne, Northumberland for Zakynthos, Greece. Subsequently foundered in the North Sea with the loss of all hands, wreckage was discovered off the Middle Cross Sand on 27 August.
Courier	United States	The 258-ton sternwheel paddle steamer was destroyed on the Ohio River at the mouth of the Cache River between Cairo and Mound City, Illinois, by a fire that began while she was transferring stores to the steamer Volunteer (Flag unknown).
Ibalia	United Kingdom	The ship was driven ashore near "Oxey". She was on a voyage from Liverpool, Lancashire to Dordrecht, South Holland, Netherlands.
Victor	Sweden	The schooner collided with Sacramento (United States Navy) off the Dutch coast and was severely damaged. She was on a voyage from Antwerp, Belgium to Stockholm.

== 23 August ==
List of shipwrecks: 23 August 1864
Ship	State	Description
Adira	Trieste	The steamship ran aground off Cape Boffos, Cyrus. She was on a voyage from Trieste to Alexandria, Egypt. She was refloated and resumed her voyage.
Aliwal	(United Kingdom of Great Britain and Ireland) Guernsey	The brig sprang a leak and was beached in Vanstille Bay. She was on a voyage from Newcastle upon Tyne, Northumberland to Havre de Grâce, Seine-Inférieure, France. She was later refloated and taken in to Cherbourg, Seine-Inférieure.
Laura	United Kingdom	The ship ran aground on The Platters. She was on a voyage from Pomaron, Portugal to Ipswich, Suffolk. She was refloated and put in to Harwich, Essex in a severely leaky condition.
Martha	United Kingdom	The schooner struck the Stag Rock and was damaged. She was on a voyage from Portland, Dorset to Dublin. She put in to Penzance, Cornwall in a leaky condition.
Zeolite	United Kingdom	The brigantine ran aground on the North Reefs, off the coast of Bermuda. She was on a voyage from Jamaica to London. She had been refloated by 1 September and taken in to Bermuda.

== 24 August ==
List of shipwrecks: 24 August 1864
Ship	State	Description
Amity	United Kingdom	The steamship collided with the steamship John Fenwick (United Kingdom) and sank off the Maplin Sand, in the North Sea off the coast of Essex with the loss of her captain.
Brazilian Packet	United Kingdom	The ship ran aground on the Swinebottoms, in the Baltic Sea. She was on a voyage from Kronstadt, Russia to Dundee, Forfarshire. She was refloated and taken in to Helsingør, Denmark in a leaky condition. Following repairs, she resumed her voyage.
Favourite	(United Kingdom of Great Britain and Ireland) New Zealand	The cutter foundered in the Hauraki Gulf during a heavy storm.
SMS Grille	Prussian Navy	The aviso ran aground in the Trave. She was later refloated with assistance from the gunboats SMS Comet and SMS Cyclop (both Prussian Navy).
Jeune Pauline	France	The brigantine was driven ashore at Zuydcoote, Nord with the presumed loss of all hands.
Martha	United Kingdom	The ship was driven ashore at Linn Head, Pembrokeshire.

== 25 August ==
List of shipwrecks: 25 August 1864
Ship	State	Description
Charlotte	United Kingdom	The ship was wrecked in Sandwich Bay. Her crew were rescued by Escort (United Kingdom).
Henrietta	United Kingdom	The barque was wrecked in Long Cove, Gaspé Bay. She was on a voyage from South Shields, County Durham to Quebec City, Province of Canada, British North America.
Maria	(United Kingdom of Great Britain and Ireland) British North America	The steamship ran aground on the Rand Reef, off Saint John, New Brunswick. She was on a voyage from Saint John to Havana.
HMS Pantaloon	Royal Navy	The Racer-class sloop was driven ashore. She was subsequently refloated, repaired and returned to service.
Titania	United Kingdom	The ship ran aground at Copenhagen, Denmark. She was on a voyage from Hull, Yorkshire to Copenhagen.
Urda	Denmark	The schooner ran aground and was damaged. She was on a voyage from Stege to Newcastle upon Tyne, Northumberland, United Kingdom. She was refloated and put in to Kristiansand, Norway in a leaky condition.
Wandering Shepherd	United Kingdom	The ship was wrecked on Hogland, Russia. Her crew were rescued. She was on a voyage from Kronstadt to Riga.

== 26 August ==
List of shipwrecks: 26 August 1864
Ship	State	Description
Emma Boyd	Confederate States of America	The 172-ton sternwheel paddle steamer struck a snag in the Alabama River at Selma, Alabama.
Francisca	Prussia	The brig struck the mole at Swinemünde. She was on a voyage from Stettin to an English port. She put in to Swinemünde in a leaky condition.
Oskar	Sweden	The schooner was driven ashore at Vang, Bornholm, Denmark. She was on a voyage from Kalmar to Apenrade, Denmark.
Wanderer	United Kingdom	The brig was driven ashore at Dragør, Denmark. She was on a voyage from Narva, Russia to Hartlepool, County Durham. She was refloated with assistance from a steamship and taken in to Helsingør, Denmark.

== 27 August ==
List of shipwrecks: 27 August 1864
Ship	State	Description
Blue Bell	United Kingdom	The schooner foundered off Scratby, Norfolk with the loss of all hands.
Woolton	United Kingdom	The brig was driven ashore and severely damaged at "Fort Large", Rio de Janeiro, Brazil. She was on a voyage from Liverpool, Lancashire to Rio de Janeiro. She was refloated with assistance from the steamship Montserrat (Brazil) and taken in to Rio de Janeiro in a severely leaky condition.

== 28 August ==
List of shipwrecks: 28 August 1864
Ship	State	Description
Baltimore	Prussia	The brig was driven ashore and wrecked on Bornholm, Denmark. Her crew were rescued. She was on a voyage from Memel to Newcastle upon Tyne, Northumberland, United Kingdom.
Meteor	Russia	The ship was driven ashore and wrecked at English Point, British North America. She was on a voyage from Bermuda to Quebec City, Province of Canada, British North America.
Olives	United Kingdom	The ship was driven ashore at Suez, Egypt. Her crew were rescued.
Unnamed	Prussia	The barque was driven ashore on Bornholm.

== 29 August ==
List of shipwrecks: 29 August 1864
Ship	State	Description
Alidon	United Kingdom	The ship ran aground off Rams Point, County Cork. She was on a voyage from Liverpool, Lancashire to Pomaron, Portugal. She was refloated with assistance from a tug and resumed her voyage.
Evie	United Kingdom	The ship was wrecked on the Homer Head Reef, in the Strait of Belle Isle. She was on a voyage from Quebec City, Province of Canada, British North America to the Clyde. She was refloated in mid-October and taken in to Sainte-Barbe, Province of Canada.
Fantasie	Norway	The barque ran aground on the Goodwin Sands, Kent, United Kingdom.
Margaret	United Kingdom	The schooner was driven ashore at Duncannon, County Wexford. She was on a voyage from Newcastle, County Down to Liverpool, Lancashire. She was refloated the next day and resumed her voyage.
Palm	United Kingdom	The ship ran aground in the Bosphorous. She was refloated and resumed her voyage.
Sea Queen	United Kingdom	The ship ran aground in the Hooghly River.
Serena	Spain	The ship collided with a steamship and sank. She was on a voyage from Tarragona to New York.

== 30 August ==
List of shipwrecks: 30 August 1864
Ship	State	Description
China	United Kingdom	The ship was abandoned off the Torres Islands. Her crew survived. She was on a voyage from Rangoon, Burma to Bombay, India.
Hannah	United Kingdom	The brig was wrecked on Groves Reef. She was on a voyage from Belize City, British Guiana to London.
Prosperous	United Kingdom	The schooner ran aground off The Needles, Isle of Wight. She was on a voyage from Newcastle upon Tyne, Northumberland or South Shields, County Durham to San Sebastián, Spain. She was refloated and taken in to Cowes, Isle of Wight.

== 31 August ==
List of shipwrecks: 31 August 1864
Ship	State	Description
Arabia	United Kingdom	The full-rigged ship was driven ashore and wrecked at Scarlett Point, near Castletown, Isle of Man. Her twenty crew survived. She was on a voyage from Liverpool, Lancashire to Quebec City, Province of Canada, British North America.
Commerce	United Kingdom	The ship ran aground at Passage West, County Cork. She was on a voyage from Newport, Monmouthshire to Waterford. She was refloated.
Helen Macdonald	United Kingdom	The ship was driven onto the Spanish Cay Reef. She was on a voyage from Belize City, British Guiana to Liverpool.
John Swasy	United States	The 236-ton sternwheel paddle steamer struck a snag and sank in the Mississippi River at Devil's Island above Cape Girardeau, Missouri.
Mary Bowers	United Kingdom	American Civil War, Union blockade: While attempting to run the Union blockade into Charleston, South Carolina, with a cargo of coal and general merchandise, the 550- or 680-ton iron-hulled sidewheel paddle steamer struck the wreck of the screw steamer Georgiana (Confederate States of America) and sank 3 to 4 nautical miles (5.6 to 7.4 km) off Long Island, South Carolina, east of Breach Inlet (32°46′47″N 79°45′35″W), becoming a total loss.

== Unknown date ==
List of shipwrecks: Unknown date in August 1864
Ship	State	Description
Advance	(United Kingdom of Great Britain and Ireland) New Zealand	The cutter went ashore near the mouth of the Hokianga Harbour, while en route from Auckland to Kaipara Harbour.
Alice	United Kingdom	The ship was driven ashore in the Yangtze and was abandoned by her crew. She was on a voyage from Singapore, Straits Settlements to Shanghai, China. She was refloated on 21 August and taken in to Shanghai.
Anastasia	Russia	The ship sprang a leak and foundered off "Katschov". She was on a voyage from Narva to Reval.
Arcadia	United Kingdom	The ship was driven ashore at South Shields, County Durham.
Argo	United Kingdom	The barque was abandoned in the Atlantic Ocean.
Australia	United States	The ship was wrecked on the Goodwin Sands, off Amherst, Burma before 22 August. She was on a voyage from Moulmein, Burma to a British port. Australia was refloated on 8 September.
Barbadian	United Kingdom	The ship ran aground on Salt Key between 10 and 29 August. She was on a voyage from Havana to Sagua La Grande, Cuba.
Calcutta	United Kingdom	The ship ran aground at Kurrachee, India before 8 August. She was on a voyage from Kurrachee to Marseille, Bouches-du-Rhône, France. She was refloated and resumed her voyage, but consequently put in to Calcutta, India in a leaky condition.
Castor	Netherlands	The ship was run down and sunk by a steamship. She was on a voyage from Newcastle upon Tyne, Northumberland, United Kingdom to Cádiz, Spain.
Fawn	(United Kingdom of Great Britain and Ireland) New Zealand	The schooner was wrecked on a sandbar at Sumner.
Frederick Huth	United Kingdom	The ship was driven ashore at Dragør, Denmark. She was on a voyage from Riga, Russia to South Shields.
Gem	(United Kingdom of Great Britain and Ireland) Victoria	The schooner collided with the steamship Southern Cross ( (United Kingdom of Great Britain and Ireland) Victoria) and sank in the Yarra River. She had been refloated by 21 August.
Golden Spring	United Kingdom	The ship was driven ashore on Anticosti Island, Nova Scotia, British North America. She was on a voyage from Sunderland, County Durham to Quebec City, Province of Canada, British North America. She was refloated and completed her voyage, arriving at Quebec City on 15 August.
Huren	Netherlands	The ship was wrecked on Saaremaa, Russia. She was on a voyage from Riga to the Maas.
Ine	United Kingdom	The ship was wrecked in the Elbe. She was on a voyage from Peterhead, Aberdeenshire to Hamburg.
Johanna	Kingdom of Hanover	The brig was wrecked on the Kettlebottom Rock, off Land's End, Cornwall, United Kingdom. Her crew survived. She was on a voyage from Liverpool, Lancashire, United Kingdom to Stettin.
Labera	Flag unknown	The ship ran aground in the Narva River.
Lady Prudhoe	United Kingdom	The ship foundered off Cape Horn, Chile. Her crew were rescued by the barque Calypso (United States). Lady Prudhoe was on a voyage from Swansea, Glamorgan to Coquimbo, Chile.
Lamont	United Kingdom	The ship was driven ashore in the Baltic Sea. She was on a voyage from South Shields to Kronstadt, Russia. She was refloated.
Margaretha	Prussia	The ship sank in the Ems.
Martha	United States	American Civil War: The lighthouse tender was captured and burned by Confederate forces in Chandeleur Sound near Mason's Keep on the coast of Louisiana.
Maulmein	United Kingdom	The barque was wrecked near Port Blair, India before 13 August. Eight crew were reported missing. She was on a voyage from Maulmein, Burma to Port Blair.
Nereus	United Kingdom	The ship was wrecked on Aarsuas Key. She was on a voyage from Sunderland to Havana.
Norwegian	United Kingdom	The ship was lost on "Hokenweg".
Paragon	United Kingdom	The ship ran aground on the Middle Ground, in the Baltic Sea. She was on a voyage from South Shields to Swinemünde, Prussia. She was refloated and resumed her voyage.
Prima Donna	United Kingdom	The ship was driven ashore near Kronstadt She was on a voyage from Gallipoli, Ottoman Empire to Kronstadt. She was refloated.
Rose	United Kingdom	The ship was wrecked on a reef off Fort-de-France, Martinique. She was on a voyage from Cardiff, Glamorgan to Martinique.
San Jean Baptiste	France	The lugger was abandoned in the North Sea before 13 June.
Sapphire	United Kingdom	The schooner struck a sunken rock and sank in the River Suir on or before 22 August.
Schwan	Prussia	The barque was wrecked on Bornholm, Denmark. Her crew were rescued. She was on a voyage from Danzig to London, United Kingdom.
Tigris	United Kingdom	The ship ran aground in the Strait of Billiton. She was on a voyage from Liverpool to Batavia, Netherlands East Indies and Singapore, Straits Settlements. She was refloated and completed her voyage, arriving on 20 August.
HMS Urgent	United Kingdom	The troopship ran aground at St Anns, Nova Scotia. She was later refloated and taken in to Quebec City, Province of Canada, British North America, where she arrived on 5 September.
Von Saffert	Netherlands	The ship was driven ashore and sank at Hong Kong.
Vriendschap	Netherlands	The ship was wrecked on "Kuhnio Island", Prussia. She was on a voyage from Riga to an English port.
Wye	United Kingdom	The steamship was driven ashore on Nevis in mid-August. She was on a voyage from the Windward Islands to Saint Thomas, Virgin Islands.
Zuileden	Flag unknown	The ship ran aground. She was on a voyage from Cádiz, Spain to Kronstadt. She was refloated and completed her voyage in a leaky condition.
Unidentified wharf boat	United States	American Civil War: Loaded with government stores, the wharf boat was burned by Confederate forces at Owensboro, Kentucky.
