= James Funk =

New York Pilot boat

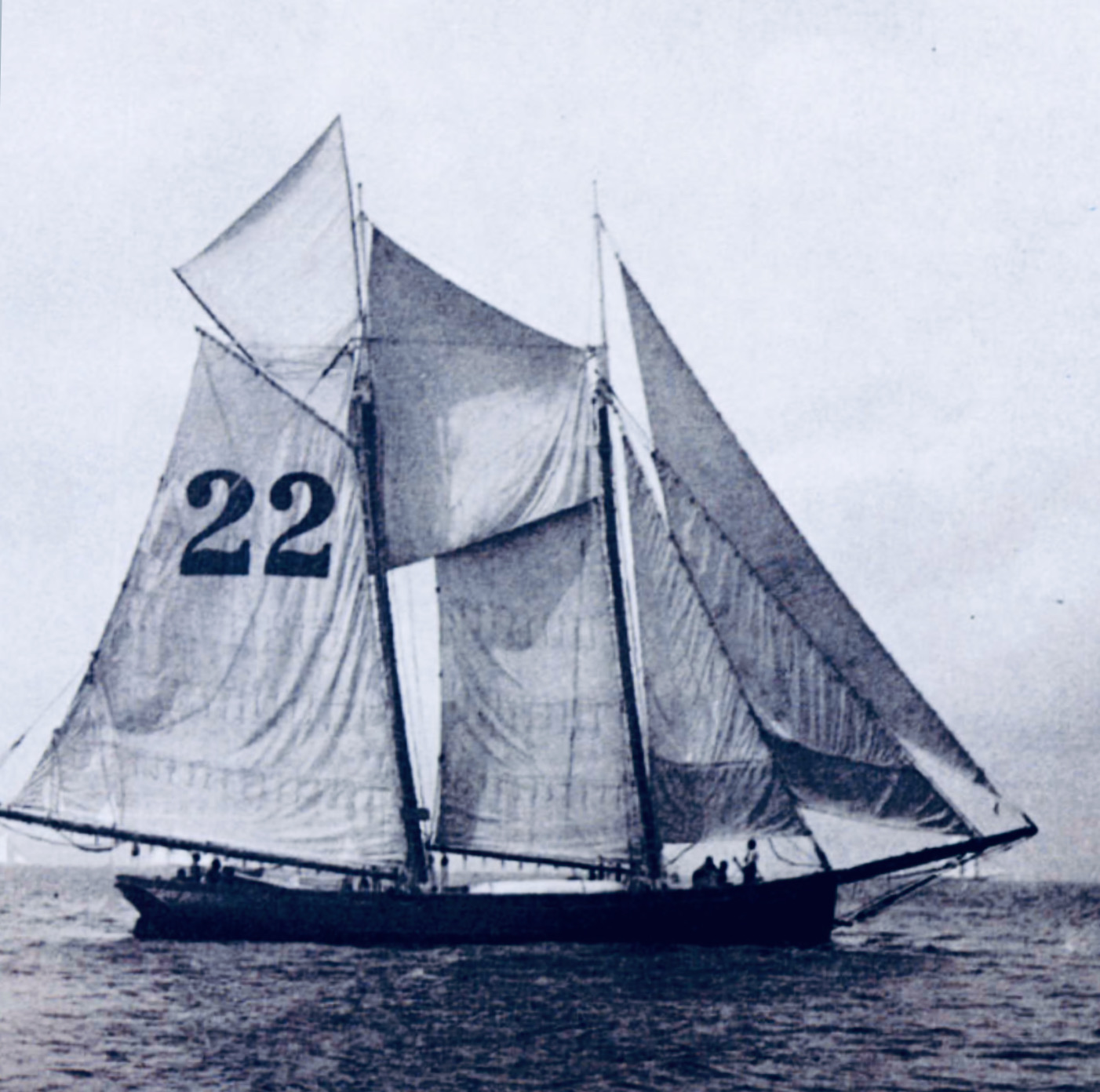
- New York pilot boat James Funk No. 22.

History

United States
- Name: James Funk
- Owner: New York Pilots
- Operator: A. C. Malcolm; Robert Yates, William Smith
- Builder: Greenpoint, Brooklyn
- Cost: $15,000
- Launched: 1862
- Out of service: 1864
- Captured: 1864
- Fate: Sank at sea

General characteristics
- Class & type: schooner
- Tonnage: 122-tons TM
- Length: 81 ft 0 in (24.69 m)
- Draft: 9 ft 0 in (2.74 m)
- Depth: 21 ft 5 in (6.53 m)
- Propulsion: Sail

James Funk was a 19th-century New York City pilot boat built in 1862 at Greenpoint, Brooklyn for a company of New York Pilots. She was built for speed. She was assigned the "Number 22," which was displayed on her mainsail. The James Funk was captured and burned by the Confederate raiding steamer CSS Tallahassee during the American Civil War. The Charlotte Webb was built in 1865 to take the place of the James Funk that was destroyed.

== Construction and service ==
The James Funk No. 22, was launched in 1862 from Greenpoint, Brooklyn. She was registered with the Record of American and Foreign Shipping from 1883 to 1984 as James Funk. Her master was Captain A. C. Malcolm; her owners were a company of New York Pilots, belonging to the port of New York. She was 81 feet in length, her draft was 9 feet, she weighed 122-tons, and built for speed.

On October 16, 1863, when the weather was dark and thick, the pilot-boat James Funk collided with the United States supply steamer Union, near Sandy Hook. The pilot-boat was in tow and no ship light was on. She started to sink and her crew escaped in yawls. It was estimated that she was worth between $12,000 and $15,000. She was raised and then return to port.

== Civil War ==
=== End of service ===
On August 11, 1864, during the American Civil War, the pilot-boat James Funk, No. 22, was 60 miles southeast of Sandy Hook, when the Confederate raiding cruiser the Tallahassee approached disguised with an American ensign flying at the masthead. Pilot William Smith, of the pilot-boat took a yawl to board the Tallahassee thinking she was in need of a pilot. Instead, she was captured by the Confederate colonel, John Taylor Wood, who took control of the James Funk. His objective was to secure a pilot who could take the Tallahassee into Long Island Sound. Twenty of the Tallahassee's crew came on board the pilot-boat and the crew of the James Funk were transferred to the Tallahassee.

The James Funk was turned into a tender and a decoy for the Tallahassee. Captain Wood used the pilot-boat to capture and burn other schooners and brigs, including the A. M. Lee. He then burned the James Funk, which he later regretted.

The same day, the Tallahassee captured and burned the pilot-boat William Bell, No. 24, Adriatic and several other boats. The Confederates then sailed the Tallahassee to Fire Island, where the crew and passengers went ashore. Robert Yates, captain of the pilot-boat provided his account of the capture of the James Funk, after he arrived safely back to his home in New York City.

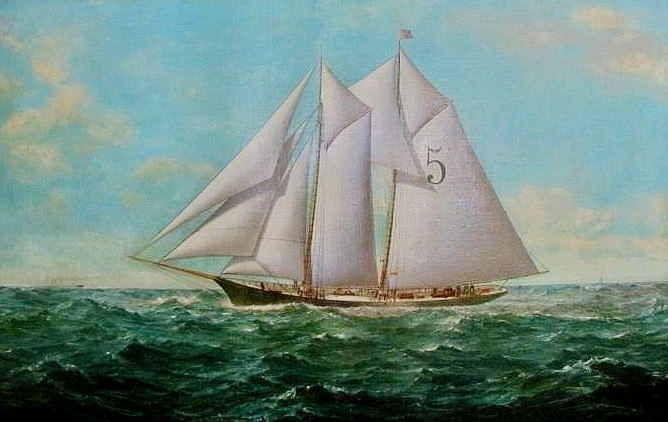
Pilot boat Charlotte Web.

In the book, "From Sandy Hook to 62", Charles Edward Russell, describes the chase of the Tallahassee cruiser against the James Funk and William Bell.

The pilot boat Charlotte Webb was built by Eckford Webb in May 1865 at the Webb & Bell shipyard in Greenpoint, Brooklyn, to take the place of the James Funk, No. 22, that was captured and burned by the Confederate raiding steamer Tallahassee.

== See also ==
- List of Northeastern U. S. Pilot Boats
