= Charlotte Webb =

New York Pilot boat

Charlotte Web
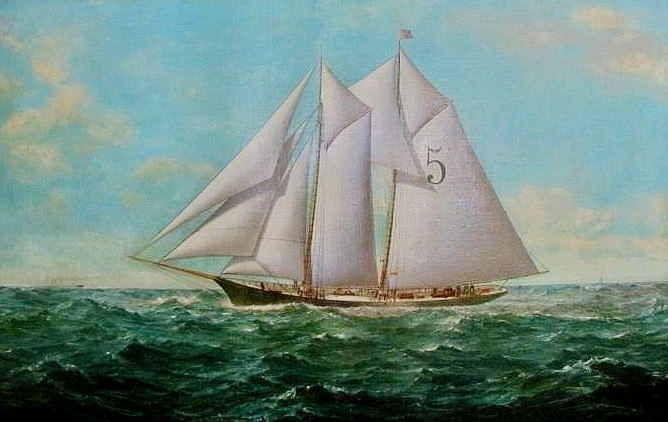
- Pilot boat Charlotte Web, No. 5.

History

United States
- Name: Charlotte Webb
- Namesake: Charlotte Webb, wife of Eckford Webb
- Owner: Company of New York Pilots
- Operator: Edward Fryer (1876-1884); Albert C. Malcolm (1885)
- Builder: Webb & Bell shipyard
- Launched: June 15, 1865
- Out of service: May 19, 1889
- Fate: Sank

General characteristics
- Class & type: schooner
- Tonnage: 58-tons TM
- Length: 79 ft 0 in (24.08 m)
- Beam: 28 ft 0 in (8.53 m)
- Depth: 8 ft 0 in (2.44 m)
- Propulsion: Sail

Charlotte Webb was a 19th-century New York City pilot boat built in 1865 at the Webb & Bell shipyard to take the place of the James Funk, that was destroyed by the rebel Tallahassee during the Civil War. She survived the Great Blizzard of 1888, but was run down by the French steamship La Normandie in 1889. She was replaced by the pilot boat George H. Warren.

== Construction and service ==
The pilot boat Charlotte Webb was built by Eckford Webb in May 1865 at the Webb & Bell shipyard in Greenpoint, Brooklyn, to take the place of the James Funk, No. 22, that was captured and burned by the Confederate raiding steamer Tallahassee. On June 15, 1865, she was launched from the Webb & Bell shipyard. She was named in honor of the wife of Eckford Webb, which was Mrs. Charlotte Webb.

The Charlotte Webb, was registered as a pilot Schooner with the Record of American and Foreign Shipping, from 1871 to 1885. Her ship master was Edward Fryer (1876–1884) and Albert C. Malcolm (1885); her owners were the N. Y. Pilot Association; built in 1865 at the Greenpoint, New York; and her hailing port was the Port of New York. Her dimensions were 79 ft. length on deck; 28 ft. breadth of beam; 8 ft. depth of hold; and 58-tons Tonnage.

On April 16, 1872, William A. Lucky, a Sandy Hook pilot for 25 years, was with a group of men attempting to board the pilot boat Charlotte Webb, when the yawl they were in capsized. Most of the men were able to hold onto the capsized boat but Lucky was drowned.

On 2 Apr 1886, Charlotte Webb, No. 8, was towed into New York with her foremast and main masthead gone after a collision with the bark Cambusdoon off Navesink, New Jersey.

On March 17, 1888, the Charlotte Webb, No. 5, was caught up in the Great Blizzard of 1888. She arrived safely back to port with minor damage to her rigging.

== End of service ==
On May 19, 1889, the Charlotte Webb, was run down by the French Line steamship La Normandie, in a dense fog eight miles east of Sandy Hook. The pilot boat sank in three minutes. Two pilots on the Charlotte Webb were lost in the accident. Captain Albert C. Malcolm, one of the oldest and best pilots of New York harbor, was in charge during the accident was one that drowned. He was eighty-eight years old.

On June 7, 1889, the George H. Warren, No. 4. was purchased for $9,250 by Captain J. O'Sullivan and a group of New York pilots that had lost the Charlotte Webb.

== See also ==
- List of Northeastern U. S. Pilot Boats
