= John McKeon (pilot boat) =

New Jersey Pilot boat

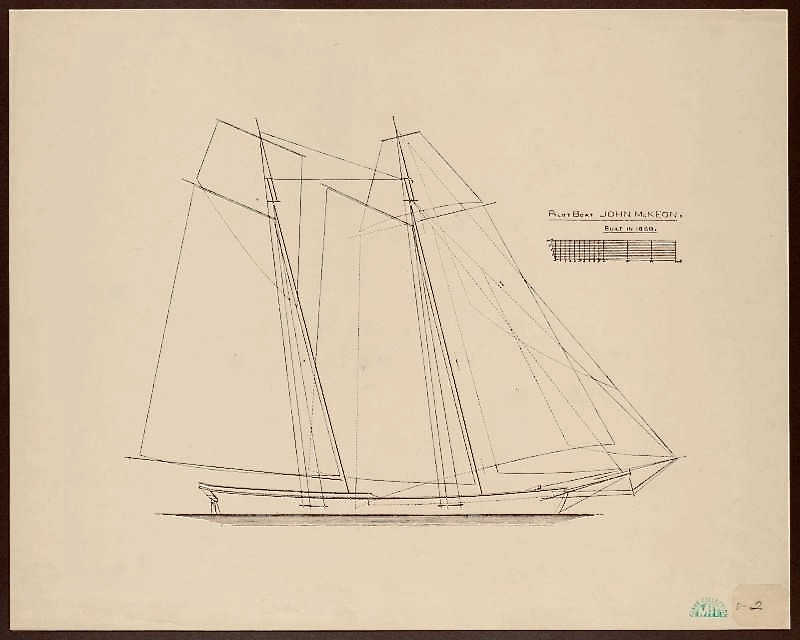
- Pilot Boat John McKeon, Built in 1838.

History

United States
- Name: John McKeon
- Namesake: John McKeon, New York lawyer and politician
- Owner: New Jersey Pilots Association
- Builder: Webb & Allen
- Cost: $9,000
- Launched: November 24, 1838
- Out of service: August 28, 1839
- Home port: New York
- Fate: Sank in a hurricane

General characteristics
- Class & type: Schooner
- Displacement: 104-tons
- Length: 78 ft 0 in (23.77 m)
- Beam: 21 ft 0 in (6.40 m)
- Depth: 7 ft 0 in (2.13 m)
- Propulsion: sails
- Sail plan: Schooner-rigged

The John McKeon was a 19th-century New Jersey pilot boat built in 1838 by Webb & Allen for the New Jersey Pilots Association. She helped transport maritime pilots between inbound or outbound ships coming into the New York Harbor. Her short career ended in 1839, when the John McKeon was shipwrecked in a hurricane that swept the New York coast. The pilot boat Gratitude was lost in the same storm.

== Construction and service ==
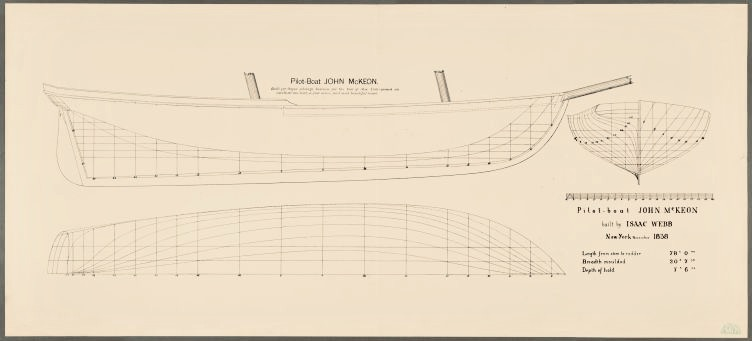
Pilot-boat John McKeon built by Isaac Webb, New York, November 1838, half-breadth plan from the Arthur H. Clark Collection.

John McKeon or John McKean was a two-masted New Jersey Pilot Boat, launched on November 24, 1838, for a company of New Jersey pilots who were licensed with the New Jersey Pilots' Association. She was valued at $9,000 and had no insurance. Her builders were the Webb & Allen shipyard located at the foot of 6th Street, New York (East River).

The John McKean's dimensions were 78.0 ft. in length; 21.0 ft. breadth of beam; 7.0 ft. depth of hold; and 104-tons.

== End of service ==
On August 28, 1839, the John McKeon was lost in a severe storm with four crewmen; the rest of the pilots were put on board ships. The four were: Lawrence Jackson, boatkeeper, age 20; Lawrence Keech, boatkeeper, age 20; John Rogers, Perth Amboy, New Jersey, age 28; Enon Russell, New York, cook, age 23. The John McKeon was last seen on the 20th off Montauk Point Light. Captain John B. H. Ward was last the pilot that left the John McKeon to board the outgoing brig Aladdin.

The New York pilot boat Gratitude, No. 3, was lost in the same storm.

== See also ==
- List of Northeastern U. S. Pilot Boats
