= Jacob Bell (shipbuilder) =

American shipbuilder

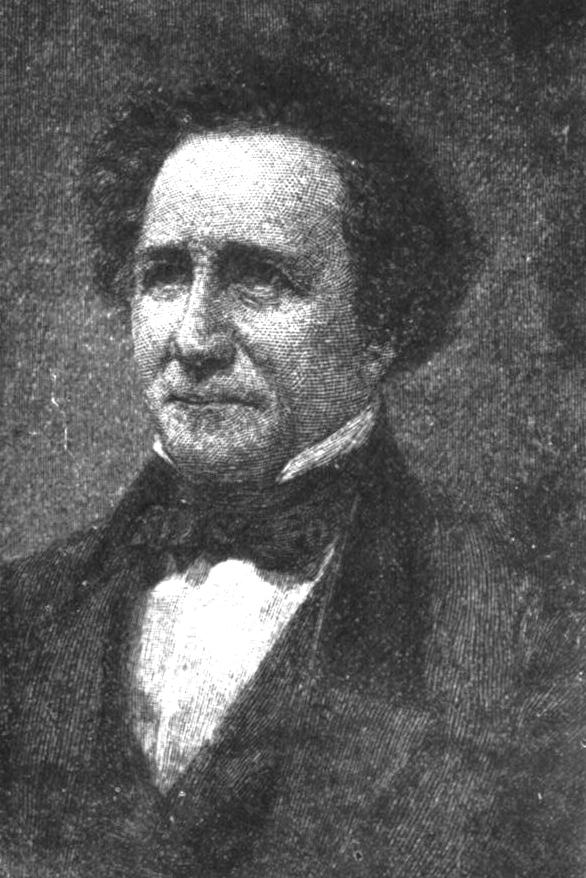
- Clipper ship builder Jacob Bell.
- Born: December 17, 1792; Middlesex Parish, Stamford, Connecticut
- Died: July 21, 1852 (aged 59); Sharon Springs, New York
- Resting place: Darien, Connecticut
- Occupation: Shipbuilder
- Employer(s): Brown & Bell
- Known for: Building the first two ocean steamers launched in New York, as well as one of the earliest clipper ships, the Houqua

Jacob Bell (December 17, 1792-July 21, 1852) was an American shipbuilder, and founder of the Brown & Bell shipyard in New York City. His company built the first two ocean steamers launched in New York, as well as one of the earliest clipper ships, the Houqua.

== Biography ==
Jacob Bell was born at the parish of Middlesex, in the town of Stamford, Connecticut on December 17, 1792. He was the son of John and Deborah Clock Bell. Bell married Phoebe Bell on May 10, 1821 and had five children. He was left motherless at the age of six years.

At the age of 17 years, about the year 1809, he was apprenticed to Messrs. Adam and Noah Brown, then among the most enterprising and successful shipbuilders in New York City. In early 1813, his employers sent him to the frontier, on the shores of Lake Erie, at that time a dense and almost unbroken wilderness. Bell was employed as a foreman in the construction of two vessels of war, the Lawrence and the Niagara. These ships were part of the American squadron on Lake Erie, with which Capt. Oliver Hazard Perry gained victory in the Battle of Lake Erie on September 10, 1813. At the close of his apprenticeship, in December 1813, Mr. Bell engaged to accompany the well-known Henry Eckford to Sackett's Harbor on Lake Ontario and aid him in building war vessels ordered by the Government. He witnessed the Battle of Lundy's Lane on July 25, 1814.

== Brown & Bell ==
In 1820, Jacob Bell established himself, together with David Brown, as a successful shipbuilder in Blakeley, Alabama. Bell and Brown returned to New York in 1829. The uncle of Mr. Bell's wife left an estate valued at $20,000, which Bell used to purchase the shipyard of his former employer at the foot of Stanton Street at Houston Street on the East River. There, he went into business with David Brown, as Brown & Bell.

On March 14, 1824, fire destroyed their property, which was not insured, leaving them under heavy obligations. One of the creditors who came to their aid was Samuel Hicks, who commissioned the construction of several vessels.

After the fire, Bell organized an independent fire company near the shipyard, Live Oak No. 44, with Isaac Webb (foreman), John Demon, Edward Merritt, and Foster Rhodes. Shipbuilder Donald McKay apprenticed at Brown & Bell, starting in 1826.

Brown & Bell built the following vessels in the 1830-1850s:

- Gratitude (pilot boat) (1824)
- James Avery (pilot boat) (1837)
- Jacob Bell (pilot boat) (1840)
- USS Jacob Bell (1842)
- USS Reefer (1846)
- Oriental (1849) Clipper
- White Squall (1850) Clipper
- Baltic of the Collins Line
- Lion
- Trade Wind (1851) Clipper
- Eagle (1851) for the Spanish government
- Ino (1851)
- John Stuart (1851)
- Messenger (1852) Clipper
- Antelope (1852)
- Flying Cloud (1853)
- Wide Awake (1853)
- Liverpool
- Congress
- Regent (steamship)
- Pacific
- Henry Clay

In 1848, Mr. Brown retired and Mr. Bell continued the business as "Jacob Bell," with the same enterprise and spirit. Before the dissolution of the firm they were the builders of more than 150 vessels, and fifty more were built afterwards by Mr. Bell. Brown & Bell built the first ocean steamers launched at the Port of New York.

Loss of health sent him to Sharon Springs, New York, where he died July 21, 1852. His grave is in the family cemetery in Darien, Connecticut.

== Legacy ==
Bell's son, Aaron C. Bell, continued operations until the shipyard closed in 1855.

The USS Jacob Bell (1842), launched by his son, was named for him.
