= Jacob Bell (pilot boat) =

New York Pilot boat

- Schooner sail plan

History

United States
- Name: Jacob Bell
- Namesake: Jacob Bell (shipbuilder)
- Owner: New York Pilots: James Britton
- Operator: Wm. H. Rolston
- Builder: Brown & Bell
- Cost: $8,000
- Launched: 22 January 1840
- Out of service: 16 February 1854
- Fate: Sank

General characteristics
- Class & type: schooner
- Tonnage: 84-tons TM
- Length: 71 ft 0 in (21.64 m)
- Beam: 19 ft 0 in (5.79 m)
- Depth: 8 ft 0 in (2.44 m)
- Propulsion: Sail

The Jacob Bell was a 19th-century Sandy Hook pilot boat built by the shipbuilder Jacob Bell for a group of New York Pilots in 1840. She was named in honor of the shipbuilder Jacob Bell, who was a partner in the Brown & Bell firm. After fourteen years of service she went ashore in a gale off Sandy Hook in 1854.

== Construction and service ==
On 22 January 1840, the pilot boat, Jacob Bell, was launched from the Brown & Bell shipyard, on the East River. She was built by shipbuilder Jacob Bell. The Bell, was named in honor of the shipbuilder Jacob Bell, who was a partner in the Brown & Bell firm. The launch was witnessed by a large party of ladies and gentlemen. She was owned by a company of New York pilots, including James Britton, Mitchell Eleock, Halston, and others. Her dimensions were 71 ft. in length; 19 ft. breadth of beam; 8 ft. in depth; and 84-tons burthen. Her cost was $8,000. She was expected to beat the famous Washington, which was known for her speed. The boat number "4" was painted as a large number on the mainsail.

In 1840, there were only eight New York pilot boats. They were the Phantom, No. 1; Washington, No. 2; New York No. 3; Jacob Bell, No. 4; Blossom, No. 5; T. H. Smith, No. 6; John E. Davidson, No. 7; and the Virginia, No. 8.

On 14 December 1840, Wm. H. Rolston, of the pilot boat Jacob Bell, along with other pilots from the port of New York, stated that they had never been employed by J. D. Stevenson and no compensation has been offered or demanded.

On March 15, 1844, an Admiral of the New York Clipper Boats thanked the pilots of the Charlotte Ann, Jacob Bell, Blossom, and Joseph N. Lord for their service and for the fact that they have often been boarded two hundred miles at sea by New York pilots.

On February 15, 1848, pilot-boat Jacob Bell, off Egg Harbor City, New Jersey passed a brig that was capsized. The wreck was also seen by the pilot-boat Washington, the previous day.

== End of service ==
After fourteen years of service, the Jacob Bell, went ashore in a gale at the Sandy Hook beach on February 16, 1854, with a loss of all the crew. She was filled with water. She lay on the beach through February and March and was reported in bad condition. By April 13, the Bell was taken off the beach and returned to the city.

== See also ==
- List of Northeastern U. S. Pilot Boats
- USS Jacob Bell (steamer)
