= Gratitude (pilot boat) =

New York Pilot boat

History

United States
- Name: Gratitude
- Owner: New York Pilots
- Operator: Enon Harris
- Builder: Brown & Bell
- Cost: $6,000
- Launched: January 1825
- Completed: 1824
- In service: 1825
- Out of service: August 28, 1839
- Homeport: New York
- Fate: Sank

General characteristics
- Class & type: Schooner
- Propulsion: sails
- Sail plan: Schooner-rigged

The Gratitude was a 19th-century Sandy Hook pilot boat built in 1824 by Brown & Bell for New York pilots. She helped transport maritime pilots between inbound or outbound ships coming into the New York Harbor. In 1839, she had a narrow escape from the slave ship La Amistad. In 1839, the Gratitude No. 3, was shipwrecked when a hurricane swept the New York coast. The New Jersey Pilot Boat John McKeon was lost in the same storm.

== Construction and service ==
The New York pilot boat Gratitude, No. 3, was a built in 1824, by Bell & Brown and launched in January 1825. She was valued at $6,000.

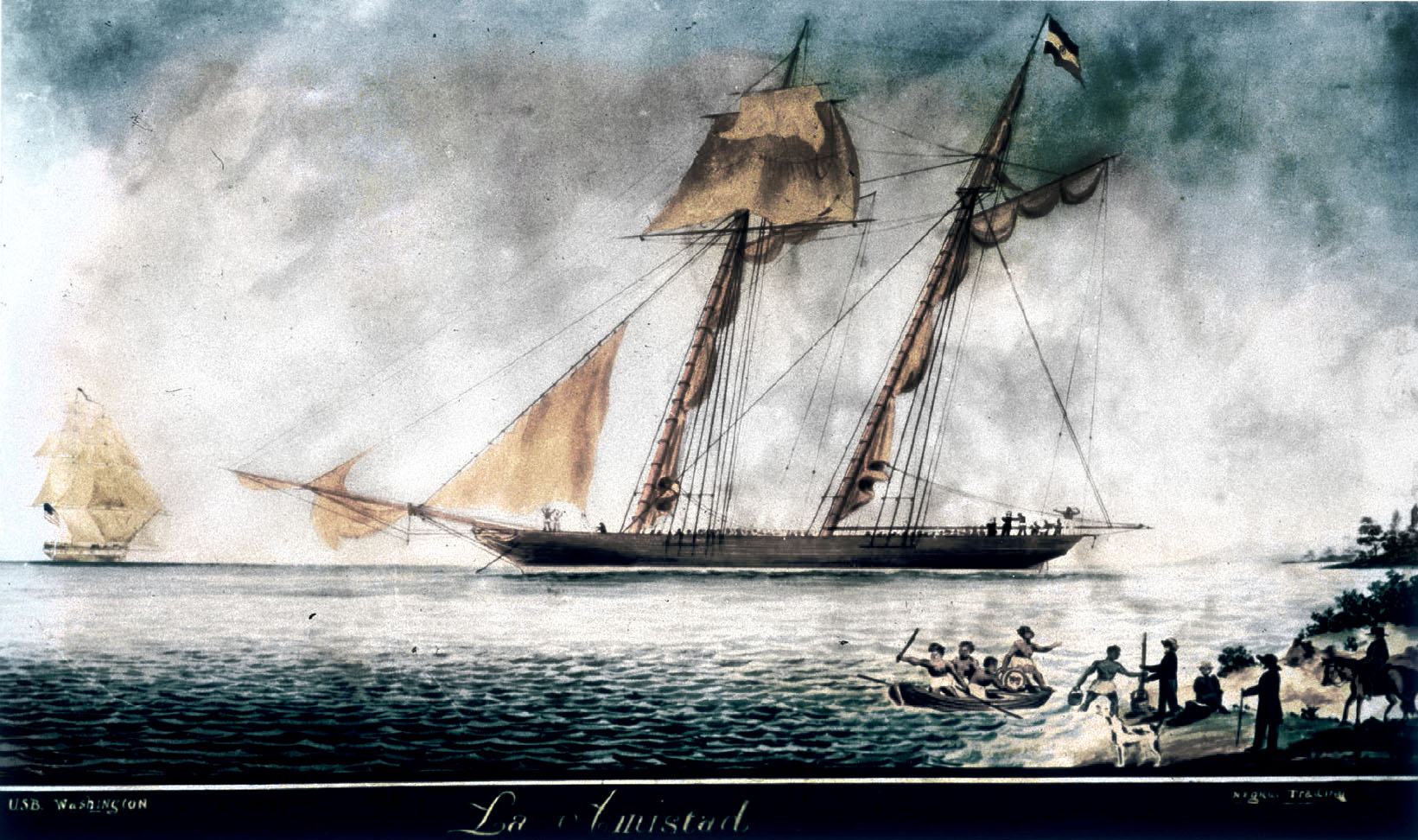
Baltimore schooner La Amistad.

Several New York pilot boats came across the Baltimore slave ship La Amistad with 25-30 black slaves on board that had taken control of the ship. The pilot boat Blossom discovered the ship on August 21, 1839, but fled when the captives attempted to board her. Two days later, the pilot-boat Gratitude came across the La Amistad when she was twenty-five miles east of Fire Island. Captain Seaman of the Gratitude said "I will bring your schooner in safely," with the intention of putting a pilot aboard. One of the ringleaders of the La Amistad ordered the men to fire on the Gratitude. Gun shots hit the pilot boat but the pilot boat was able to escape. The pilots on the Blossom communicated what they felt was a slave ship to the Collector of the Port of New York. The La Amistad was later captured by the U.S. Navy off Montauk, New York and detained in New London, Connecticut.

== End of service ==
In August 1839, the pilot schooner Gratitude No. 3, went out at sea with six pilots. Two of the pilots had left to board outbound ships to sea. A few hours later, the Gratitude was caught up in a severe hurricane that swept the coast from South Carolina to Maine on August 28 and 30. The Gratitude lost four of her pilots, three apprentices and a cook. The names of the pilots that were lost were: Enon Harris, Joseph Hendarchott, Owen Wilson, and Sydney Waite. The pilots had no insurance. The New Jersey Pilot Boat John McKeon was lost in the same storm with four of her crewmen.

== See also ==
- List of Northeastern U. S. Pilot Boats
