= Edwin Forrest (pilot boat) =

Sandy Hook Pilot boat

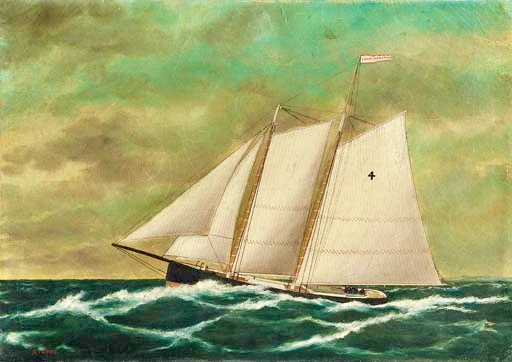
- Pilot Boat Edwin Forrest No. 4., photograph by William Pierce Stubbs.

History

United States
- Name: Edwin Forrest
- Namesake: Edwin Forrest, American Shakespearean actor
- Owner: N. Y. Pilots (New York Pilot Boat), John Low; A. Nash & Co. (Boston Pilot Boat)
- Operator: Henry Harbinson (New York Pilot Boat); J. H. Jeffreys (Boston Pilot Boat)
- Builder: Jacob A. Westervelt's Sons & Co. (New York Pilot Boat); Dennison J. Lawlor (Boston Pilot Boat)
- Laid down: 1862 (New York Pilot Boat); 1882 (Boston Pilot Boat)
- Launched: 1855 (New York Pilot Boat); 1865 (Boston Pilot Boat)
- Fate: Lost on Long Island (New York Pilot Boat); Sold (Boston Pilot Boat)

General characteristics
- Class & type: schooner
- Tonnage: 100-tons TM (New York Pilot Boat); 36-tons TM (Boston Pilot Boat)
- Length: 75 ft 0 in (22.86 m) (New York Pilot Boat); 66 ft 6 in (20.27 m) (Boston Pilot Boat)
- Beam: 20 ft 3 in (6.17 m) (New York Pilot Boat); 19 ft 3 in (5.87 m) (Boston Pilot Boat)
- Depth: 8 ft 0 in (2.44 m) (New York Pilot Boat); 7 ft 0 in (2.13 m) (Boston Pilot Boat)
- Propulsion: Sail

The Edwin Forrest was a 19th-century pilot boat built in 1855 by Jacob A. Westervelt's Sons & Co., for a group of New York pilots. She was designed by Dennison J. Lawlor, for Pilot Captain John Low. The Edwin Forrest was named in honor of the American actor Edwin Forrest. A second Edwin Forrest was built for Boston pilots in 1865 to replace the New York Edwin Forrest, No. 14, that was lost in 1862. She attained celebrity for her speed and stability. The Edwin Forrest was sold to Pensacola, Florida parties in 1882 and replaced by the George H. Warren.

== Construction and service ==
=== Edwin Forest, No. 14 ===
The New York pilot-boat Edwin Forrest No. 14, was built by Jacob A. Westervelt's Sons & Co. and designed by Aaron J. Westervelt. Pilot Henry Harbinson was the captain. She was launched on 27 March 1855, from the Westervelt shipyard at the foot of Houston Street for a company of New York and Sandy Hook pilots. She was named in honor of the great American Shakespearean actor Edwin Forrest. He was also a guest at the launch and gave a speech and toast complimentary to the pilots. The Forrest model was the same as for the pilot-boat Jacob A. Westervelt and was by the same Westervelt builders.

On 2 April 1855, a successful trial trip of the Pilot-Boat Edwin Forrest was made from the Battery and proceeded down the bay, with quests on board, as far as the Sandy Hook Lightship. On her return, the pilots were able to test her speed and strength against the pilot-boat Christian Bergh, No. 16. Captain Henry Harbinson was in command of the Forrest during her cruise.

The Edwin Forest No. 14, was one of only twenty-one New York pilot boats in 1860. On October 10, 1860, New York Sandy Hook Pilot Henry Harbinson, of the pilot boat Edwin Forrest, No. 1, signed a statement along with other pilots, that he was satisfied with the representation he had received from the New York Board of Commissioners of Pilots.

The Edwin Forest was lost on Long Island in 1862.

=== Edwin Forest No. 4 ===
The new Boston pilot-boat Edwin Forrest was launched in 1865 from the Dennison J. Lawlor's stone-lined slip at Buck's Wharf in Chelsea, Massachusetts. Lawlor designed and built the Edwin Forrest to replace the Edwin Forest, No. 14, of New York, that was lost on Long Island in 1862. The schooner Sylph was built and designed by Lawlor that same year.

The Edwin Forrest, was built to the order of Pilot Captain John Low. Her speed was the talk of the town in the 1870s. She was a consistent winner of races in the July 4th Regatta races conducted by city of Boston.

The Forrest was built from a block half-model of the pilot boat. She attained celebrity for her speed and stability. The model has a long, sharp bow, was 69 feet in length, her beam 18 was feet 6 inches, and her depth was 8 feet.

The Edwin Forrest was registered with the Record of American and Foreign Shipping from 1881 to 1898 to Captain J. H. Jeffreys as master and to A. Nash & Co. as her owners. She belonged to the port of Boston.

=== End of service ===
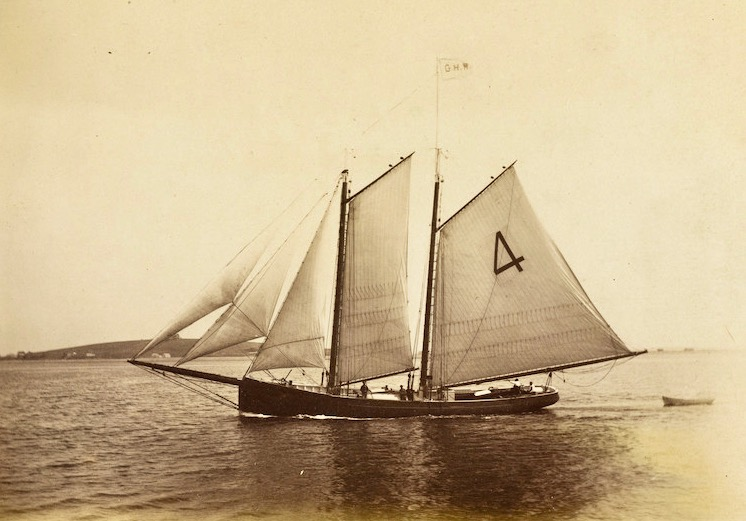
Pilot Boat George H. Warren, No. 4.

After being in the Boston pilot service for many years, on 8 Aug 1882, the pilot boat Edwin Forrest, No. 4, of Boston, was sold to the Pensacola, Florida parties for $5,500.

Boston pilot-boat George H. Warren, No. 4, was built by Porter Keene at Weymouth, Massachusetts, in 1882 to replace the Edwin Forrest, No. 4. She was launched on December 31, 1882, from the N. P. Keen shipyard at North Weymouth.

== See also ==
- List of Northeastern U. S. Pilot Boats
