= Adriatic (1861 ship) =

Passenger vessel built in 1861

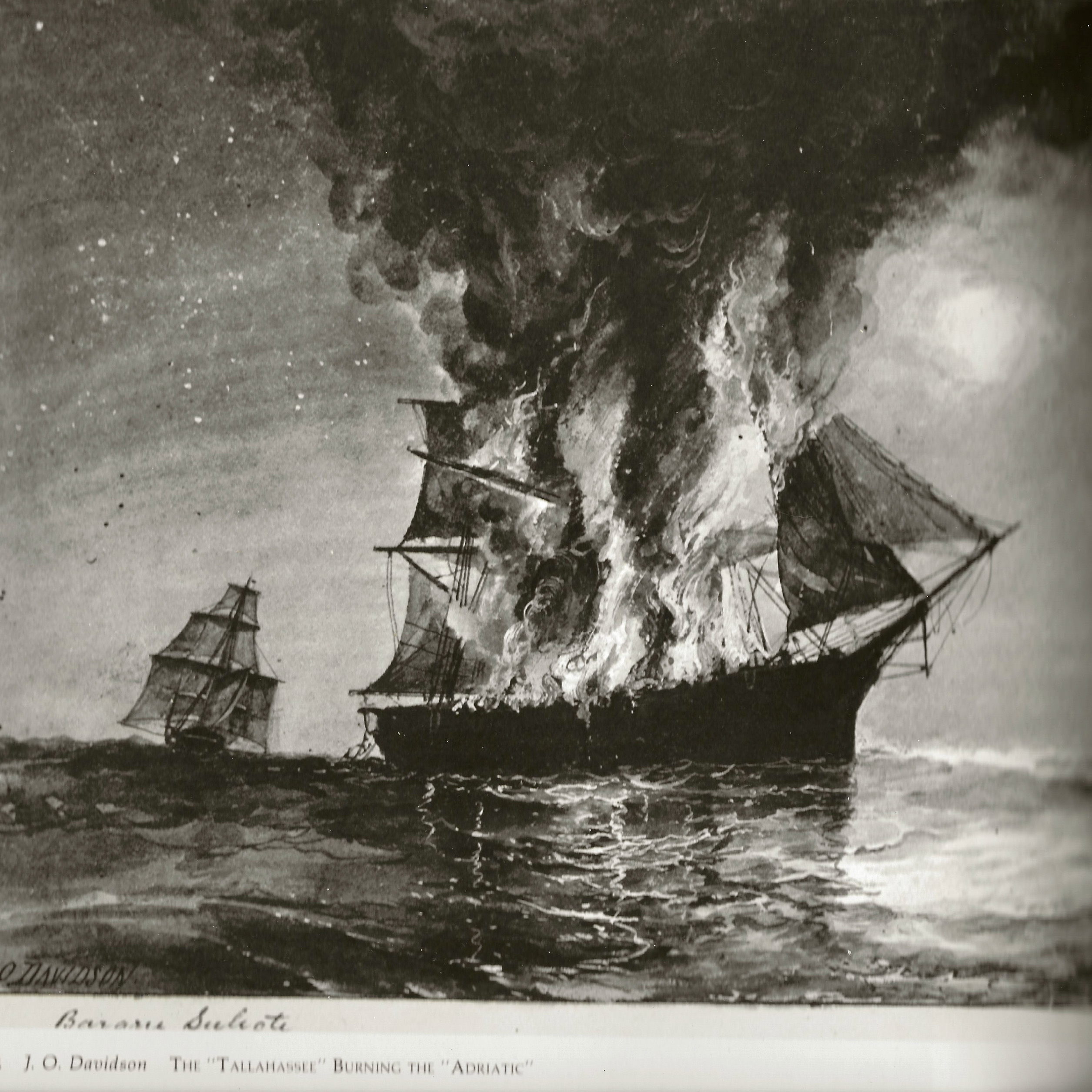
- The Tallahassee burning the Adriatic, painting by Julian Oliver Davidson

History

United States
- Name: Adriatic
- Owner: Elisha E. Morgan & Wiley, Richard H. Moore
- Operator: Richard H. Moore
- Port of registry: 1861–1864
- Builder: Curtis & Tilden shipyard in Boston, Massachusetts
- Cost: $100,000 at the time of capture
- Launched: 1861
- In service: 1861–1864
- Out of service: August 12, 1864
- Captured: 1864
- Fate: Fire, sank at sea

General characteristics
- Type: Wooden hull
- Tons burthen: 989 (bm)
- Length: 181 ft 3 in (55.25 m)
- Beam: 34 ft 2 in (10.41 m)
- Draft: 21 ft 0 in (6.40 m)
- Depth of hold: 33 ft 5 in (10.19 m)
- Propulsion: sails
- Sail plan: full-rigged ship

Adriatic was a three-masted, two deck, packet ship built in 1861 by Curtis & Tilden, Boston, Massachusetts, United States. On August 12, 1864, Adriatic was embarked from London, England en route to New York City carrying 163 German immigrants and 100 US citizens. She made it as far as the New Jersey coast before meeting the Confederate raider CSS Tallahassee, which collided with her. Captain John Taylor Wood of Tallahassee ordered every passenger on Adriatic to be taken prisoner and put on Tallahassee. Wood then ordered Adriatic burned.

== Construction ==
The Curtis & Tilden shipyard at Boston, Massachusetts built Adriatic in 1861. The firm E. E. Morgan & Son, were owners of a line of packet ships that ran carried passengers and freight between London and New York, and Adriatic joined their line. Elisha E. Morgan was part-owner, along with Captain Richard H. Moore.

The Adriatic was registered with the ‘’Record of American and Foreign Shipping’’, from 1862 to 1864. Her master was R. H. Moore; her owners were E. E. Morgan; built in 1861 at Curtis & Tilden East Boston; and her hailing port was the Port of New York.

== American Civil War ==
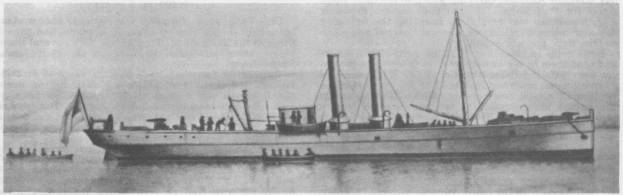
Confederate cruiser and blockade runner CSS Tallahassee

On July 7, 1864, during the American Civil War, Adriatic, Captain Richard H. Moore, sailed from London, England to New York City with 163 German immigrants, 100 US citizens, and 100-tons of coal. On August 12, 1864, she had made the New Jersey coast, 35 miles off Montauk, New York, when she met Tallahassee, which collided with Adriatic. Captain Wood ordered everyone on Adriatic to be put on Tallahassee. Wood then ordered Adriatic burned.

In the book From Sandy Hook to 62, Charles Edward Russell describes Tallahassee's chase of Adriatic. When Tallahassee ran down Adriatic, Tallahassee lost her mainmast and stanchions.

The next day, Captain Wood captured the bark Suliote, of Belfast, Maine. He transferred the passengers from the pilot boat William Bell, No. 24 and Adriatic to Suliote. James Callahan was ordered to pilot Suliote into Sandy Hook, New York.

In 2016, a team led by captain John Noonan, of the dive vessel Storm Petrel, first located and dived the wreck. The wreckage lies in 220 feet (67 m) of water 30 miles (48 km) off the eastern edge of Long Island, New York. Adriatic was positively identified in 2019. The team of divers was able to establish conclusive proof after connecting artifacts recovered with visits to the National Archives.

== Alabama Claims ==
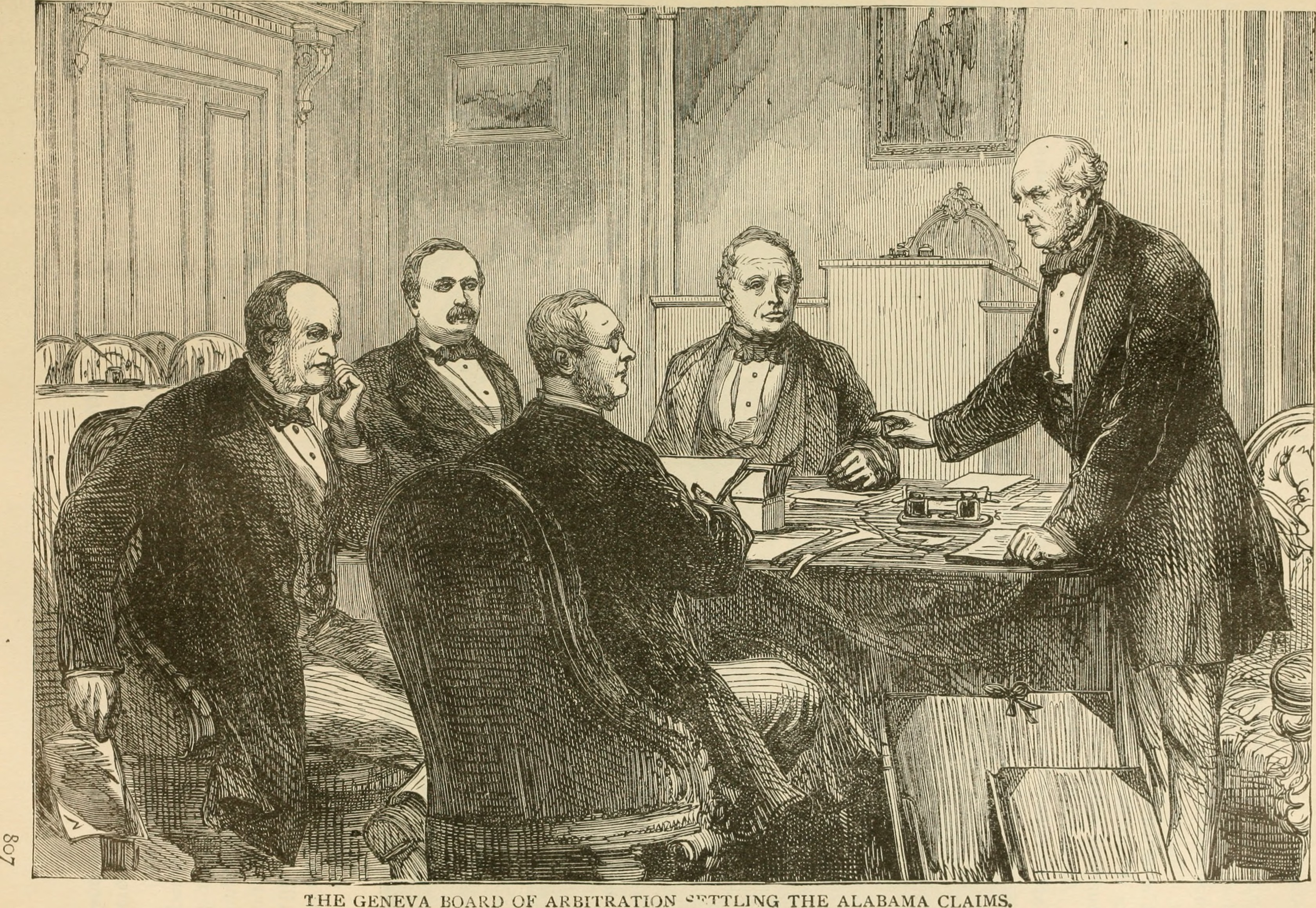
The Geneva Board of Arbitration settling the Alabama Claims

On February 23, 1883, William D. Morgan, executor for Elisha E. Morgan, part-owner of Adriatic, successfully petitioned the United States District Court for the Southern District of New York via the Alabama Claims award, for compensation for the loss of Adriatic. The case was called William D. Morgan v. The United States (No. 1058). The total claim was for $109,615.95.

On February 10, 1883, James Callahan was deposed for the Alabama Claims award. In his deposition, Callahan said that he was captain of William Bell. The court then asked him to recount the capture of Adriatic by the CSS Tallahassee.
