= Washington (pilot boat) =

Boston Pilot boat

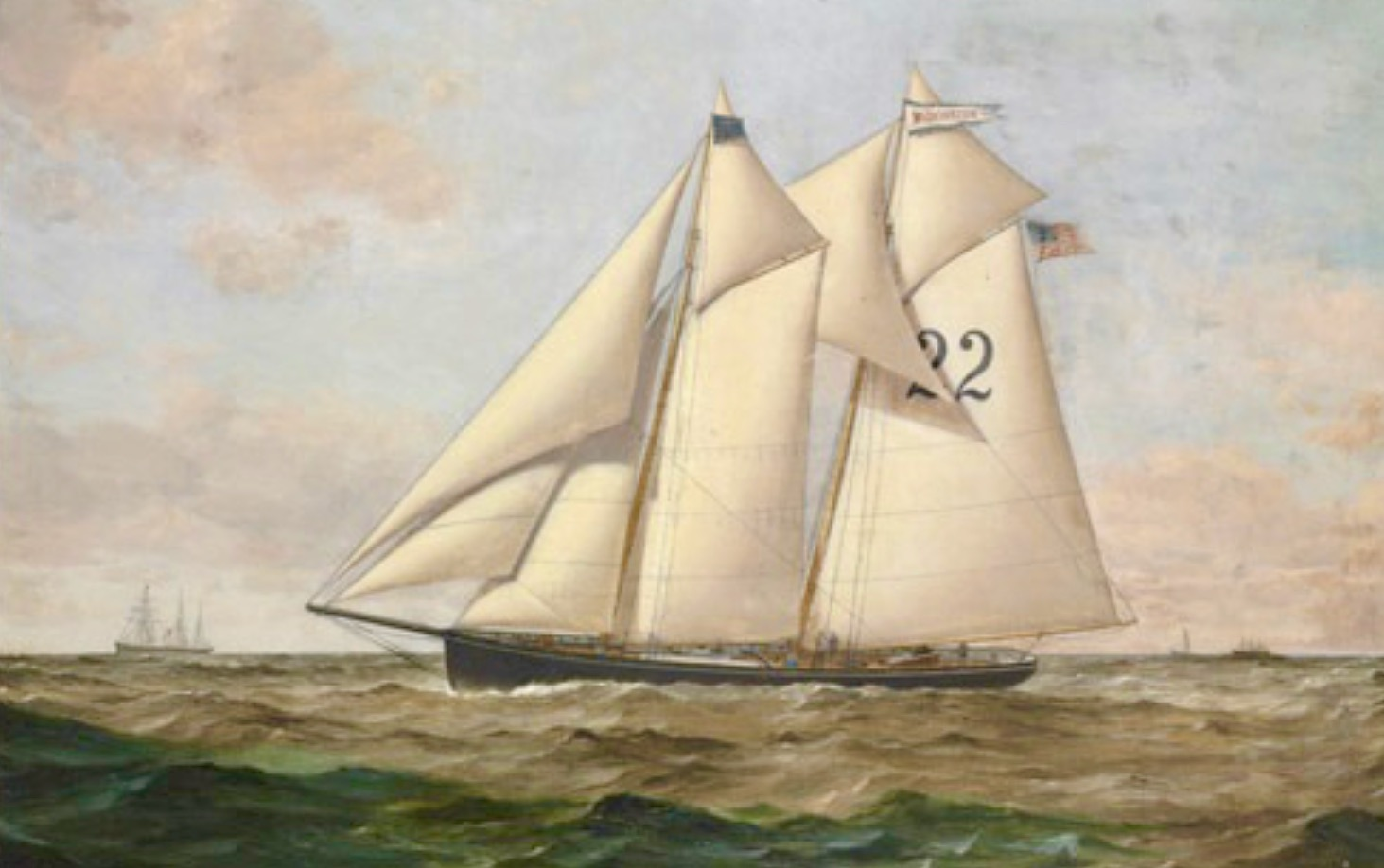
- New York pilot boat Washington, No. 22, painting by Conrad Freitag.

History

United States
- Name: Washington
- Owner: New York Pilots
- Operator: Michael Murphy
- Builder: C. & R. Poillon's shipyard (2nd Washington)
- Cost: $8,000 (1st Washington); $18,000 (2nd Washington)
- Launched: 1845 (1st Washington); November 20, 1884 (2nd Washington)
- Christened: November 20, 1884 (2nd Washington)
- Out of service: On August 2, 1884 (1st Washington)
- Fate: Sank at sea on August 2, 1884 (1st Washington)

General characteristics
- Class & type: schooner
- Tonnage: 45-tons TM
- Length: 64 ft 6 in (19.66 m)
- Beam: 17 ft 3 in (5.26 m)
- Depth: 8 ft 0 in (2.44 m)
- Propulsion: Sail

The Washington was a 19th-century Sandy Hook pilot boat built in 1845 by C. & R. Poillon for New York Pilots. She was rebuilt several times, the last with the sail number "22" painted on her mainsail. In 1884, she was sunk by the German steamship Roma, and then replaced by a new Washington.

== First Washington pilot boat ==
=== Construction and service ===
The pilot-boat Washington, according to ship registrations, was first built in 1845. She was rebuilt several times and had different sail numbers. In some cases, no sail number was provided and she was recognized only as pilot boat Washington.

=== Sail number "2" (1840–1854) ===
The sail number "2" was painted as a large number on the mainsail. Based on this number, the Washington No. 2, can be found in several prominent newspapers from 1840 to 1854.

In 1840, the pilot-boat Washington, No. 2, was listed in the New York Daily Herald, as one of eight New York pilot boats afloat.

On 14 December 1840, James Burger, of the pilot boat Washington, along with other pilots from the port of New York, stated that they had never been employed by J. D. Stevenson and no compensation has been offered or demanded.

On August 8, 1846, the pilot-boat Washington was in collision with the US steamer Colonel Harney. Thomas Gregory and others were paid $600 for injuries sustained by the pilot-boat and steamship.

On February 15, 1848, pilot-boat Washington, off Egg Harbor City, New Jersey passed a brig that was capsized. The wreck was also seen by the pilot-boat Jacob Bell, the next day.

On May 22, 1850, Henry Grinnell was on the pilot-boat Washington with Pilot Murphy to accompany the Arctic Expedition in search for John Franklin. He was on the boat for three days and parted the expedition 40 miles south of Montauk Point.

On December 21, 1852, New York pilot-boat Washington No. 2, was lost in a gale near Squam Inlet. Three of her crew drowned in a yawl trying to escape the storm. Charles Johnston, Michael Burke, and Charles Hutchins.

In the book, "From Sandy Hook to 62", Charles Edward Russell, describes the loss of the pilot-boat Washington No. 2, in January 1857 with the death on a pilot and six sailors. Other reports said that the pilot-boat Washington, No. 2 left New York harbor on January 13, 1857, and had not been heard from since January 17. The Empire City ran into her and sank her.

=== Sail number "4" (1854–1860) ===
The sail number "4" was painted as a large number on the mainsail. Based on this sail number, reports of the Washington No. 4, appeared in the New York newspapers from 1854 to 1860.

On June 17, 1854, the owners of the pilot-boat Washington, No. 4, sued to recover damages occurred by a collision with the ferry boat Transit. She soon after sank. The incident occurred in December 1851. The Court held that both parties were at fault and the damages divided between them.

On February 23, 1855, James W. Avery put an ad in the New York Daily Herald saying the pilot boat Washington of New York was for sale. Built of live oak, locust, and cedar, by Brown & Bell, New York. Apply to John W. Avery, 309 Water Street.

On January 14, 1856, pilot-boat Washington, No. 4, was on a cruise for ten days. When she was thirty-six miles from Sandy Hook, Thomas J. Murphy, James Quinn, and Peter Murphy were swept by the sea over the bowsprit to the Companionway. All survived the incident.

On June 6, 1859, the pilot-boat Washington, No. 4 found a hot-air balloon belonging to Joshua Pressy off Squan Beach. It was 32 feet in diameter and valued at $400.

In 1860, the Washington, No. 4, was one of only twenty-one pilot boats in the New York in the fleet. On October 10, 1860, New York Sandy Hook Pilot Michael Murphy, of the pilot boat Washington, No. 4, signed a statement along with other pilots, that they were satisfied with the representation of the New York Board of Commissioners of Pilots.

=== Sail number "22" (1876–1891) ===
The sail number "22" was prominently displayed in black on her mainsail. Based on this sail number, reports of the Washington No. 22 appeared in the New York newspapers from 1876 to 1890. She was registered with the Record of American and Foreign Shipping from 1876 to 1886 as Washington. Her master was Captain Thomas Murray, her owners were a company of New York Pilots. Her hailing port was New York. She was 45-tons, 64.6 feet in length, 17.3 feet breadth and 8 feet in Depth.

=== End of service ===
On August 2, 1884, the German steamship Roma, ran down the pilot-boat Washington, No. 22. The boat was owned by Sandy Hook pilots: Daniel Gillespiek, Frederick Harpenau, Michael Murphy, Edward Young, Christopher Huns, and Captain Thomas Murray. She was valued at $8,000 but was only insured for three-tenths of her value.

== Second Washington pilot boat (1884–1891) ==
On November 20, 1884, the new pilot boat-pilot Washington, No. 22, was launched to take the place of the Washington, that was run down by the steamship Roma.

She was launched at the C. & R. Poillon's shipyard, near the foot of Bridge Street, in Brooklyn. Secretary Nash was at the launch represented the New York Pilot Board. Mrs. Christian Huns christened the boat. She was 160 tons, length 95 feet, breadth of beam, 22 feet; and depth of hold, 9 1/2 feet. The cost of was $18,000. Pilots Daniel Gillespiek, Edward Young, Christopher Huns, Frederick Harpenau, and Charles Peterson were the owners of the Washington.

On January 31, 1885, pilots: Daniel Gillespiek, Frederick Harpenau, and Edward Young, owners of the pilot-boat Washington, filed a libel in the US Court against the tugboat Mary N. Hogan, claiming $9,000 in damages.

On June 12, 1885, the boatkeeper, "Dutch Billy," of the pilot-boat Washington, No. 22, was washed overboard and drowned in a heavy gale.

On March 5, 1890, Captain Edward Collins was lost from the pilot-boat Washington, No. 22, when he was crushed between the tugboat and the bark he was trying to board.

On September 14, 1891, the pilot-boat Washington, No. 22, was in tow by the pilot boat, E. F. Williams, No. 24, when she hit a cyclone three hundred and fifty miles eastward of Sandy Hook. She arrived safely back into port with damages to her masts.

== See also ==
- List of Northeastern U. S. Pilot Boats
