= George H. Warren (pilot boat) =

Boston Pilot boat

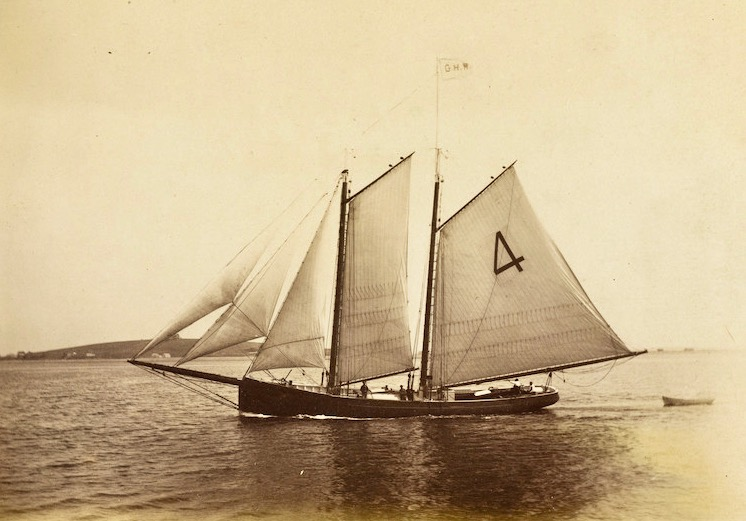
- Pilot Boat George H. Warren, No. 4.

History

United States
- Name: George H. Warren
- Namesake: George H. Warren
- Owner: John Harry Jeffery (Boston); J. O'Sullivan (New York)
- Operator: Boston Pilots: George H. Warren, John P. Spauulding, John M. Ward, Walter W. Jeffrey, Catherine Jeffrey, Hayden Sargent, Charlotte C. A. Archer, Timothy Davis, John M. Davis and Charles L. Davis; New York Pilots: William Murphy, Frank Kelly, Thomas F. Pennea, Patrick Walsh, George D. Samson, and Walter Berry
- Builder: Porter Keene
- Cost: 9,250
- Launched: December 31, 1882
- Out of service: February 7, 1895
- Fate: Sank

General characteristics
- Class & type: schooner
- Tonnage: 50-tons TM (New York Pilot Boat)
- Length: 70 ft 9 in (21.56 m) (New York Pilot Boat)
- Beam: 20 ft 0 in (6.10 m) (New York Pilot Boat)
- Depth: 8 ft 2 in (2.49 m) (New York Pilot Boat)
- Propulsion: Sail

The George H. Warren was a 19th-century pilot boat built in 1882 by Nathaniel Porter Keen at North Weymouth, Massachusetts, to replace the Edwin Forrest, No. 4, which was sold to the Pensacola, Florida pilots. The George H. Warren originally belonged to the Boston pilot fleet, and in 1889 she was purchased by a group of New York pilots. She and her crew were then lost in the great blizzard of 1895.

== Construction and service ==
The George H. Warren was a schooner rigged two-masted pilot-boat, built in 1882 by Porter Keene at North Weymouth, Massachusetts, to replace the Edwin Forrest, No. 4, which was sold to the Pensacola, Florida pilots. She was launched on December 31, 1882, from the Porter Keene shipyard at Weymouth. John Harry Jeffery was the captain.

The Warren No. 4, went on her first cruise on February 14, 1883. She was owned by Captain John Harry Jeffries and other Boston pilots: George H. Warren, John P. Spauulding, John M. Ward, Walter W. Jeffrey, Catherine Jeffrey, Hayden Sargent, Charlotte C. A. Archer, Timothy Davis, John M. Davis and Charles L. Davis. She was named for George H. Warren, one of the owners who also owned the Boston keel cutter-rigged yacht Maggie.

The George H. Warren, was registered as a pilot schooner with the Record of American and Foreign Shipping, in 1884 and 1894. Her ship master and owner was John Harry Jeffery; built in 1883 at North Weymouth, Massachusetts; and her hailing port was the Port of Boston. Her dimensions were 70.9 ft. in length; 20 ft. breadth of beam; 8.2 ft. depth of hold; and 50-tons Tonnage.

On June 7, 1889, the George H. Warren, No. 4. was purchased for $9,250 by Captain J. O'Sullivan and a group of New York pilots that had lost the Charlotte Webb that was run down by the French Line steamship La Normandie on May 19, 1889. The new owner, Captain J. O'Sullivan, made the arrangements for the transfer.

William S. McLaughlin was an apprentice on the George H. Warren, No. 5 in the winter of 1894. He was supposed to be on the Warren leaving Tompkinsville, Staten Island in February 1895, when one of the pilots told him he could not go to sea because he had an abscess on his right hand.

== End of service ==
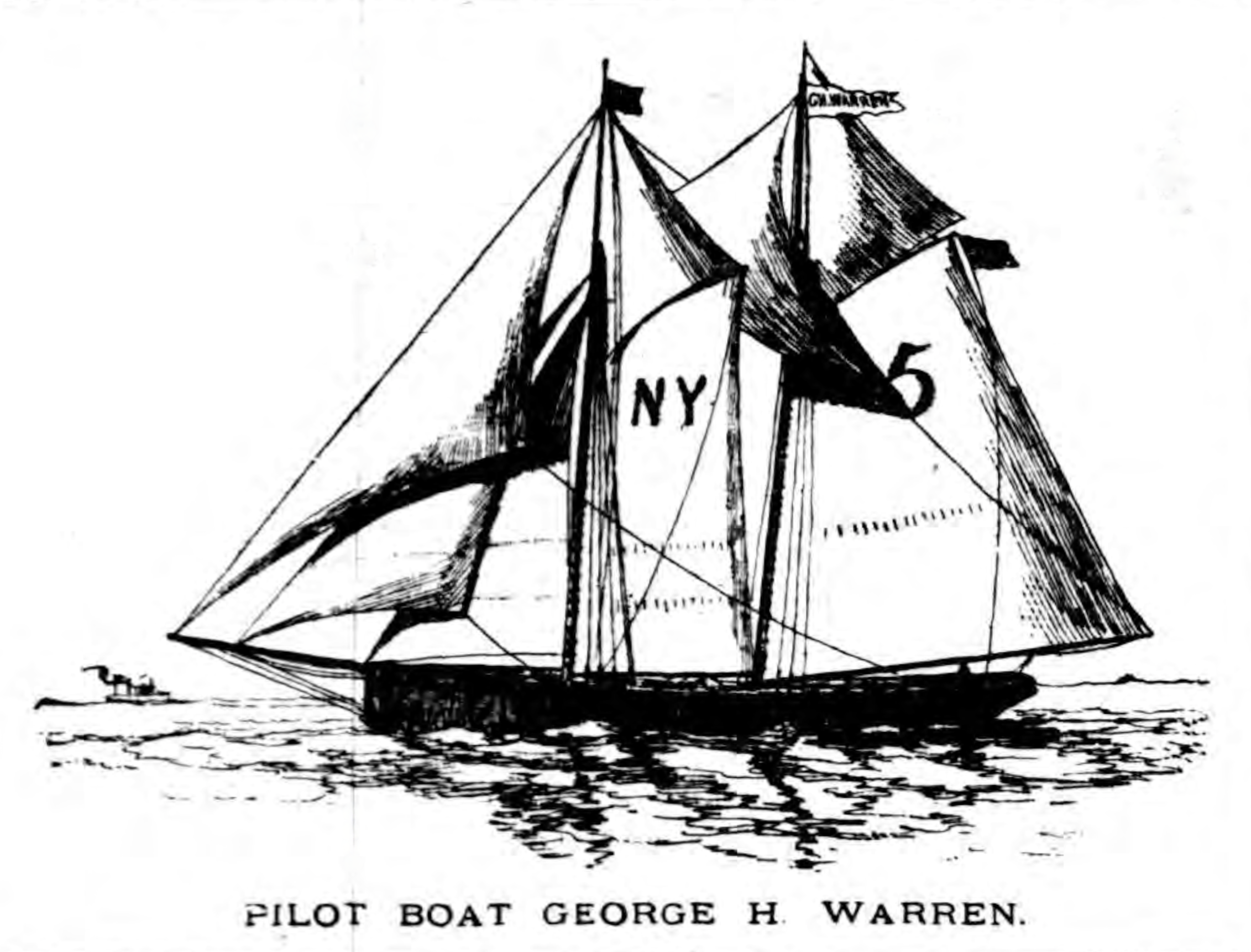
Pilot Boat George H. Warren (1895).

On February 7, 1895, the Sandy Hook pilot boat George H. Warren, No. 5, went missing just before the great blizzard. She had six pilots on board, a boatkeeper, cook, and two seamen. The pilots were, William Murphy, Francis Kelly, Thomas F. Pennea, Patrick Walsh, George D. Samson, and Walter Berry that were part owners of the boat.

On March 15, 1895, no news had been reported about the lost boat. Captain J. O'Sullivan, an owner that was not on the Warren asked the Board of Pilot Commissioners for permission to build a replacement boat.

== See also ==
- List of Northeastern U. S. Pilot Boats
