= Julian Oliver Davidson =

American marine painter

Julian O. Davidson
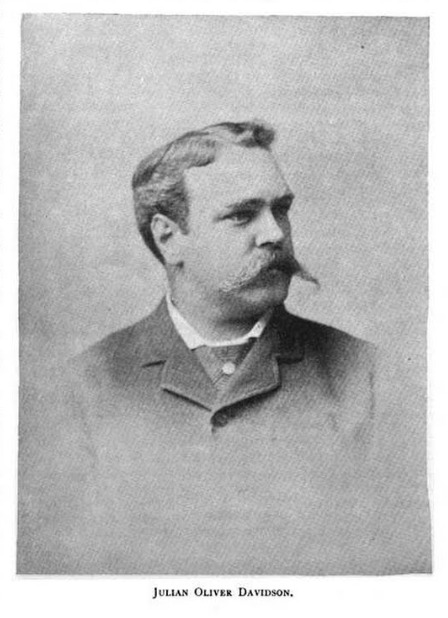
- Julian Oliver Davidson, painter and illustrator
- Born: Julian Oliver Davidson; December 27, 1853; Cumberland, Maryland, US
- Died: April 30, 1894 (aged 40); Nyack, New York, US
- Resting place: Woodlawn Cemetery
- Known for: marine art
- Style: oil
- Spouse: Cornelia Trimble Merritt

Julian Oliver Davidson (December 27, 1853–April 30, 1894) was a 19th-century American marine artist and illustrator from Nyack, New York. He best known works of the famous naval battles of the American Civil War. Davidson's works were exhibited at the Hudson River Museum, New-York Historical Society and the National Academy of Design in the 1870s and 1880s.

== Early life ==
Davidson was born in Cumberland, Maryland in 1853 and educated in a private school in Hamden, Connecticut. He was a nephew of the literary Lucretia Maria Davidson and Margaret Miller Davidson of Plattsburgh, New York. He is the son of Colonel Matthias Oliver Davidson (1819-1871) and Harriet Smith Standish (1826-1902), who was a descendant of Myles Standish (1584-1656). In 1870, he left home to be on the crew of a steamship sailing around the world, where he learned an appreciation of drawing and painting of ships and boats. He returned to New York and settled in South Nyack, New York. In 1877, he married Cornelia Trimble Merritt (1852-1895) and had one child.

== Career ==
Davidson specialized in the naval battles of the United States. He best known works of the famous naval battles of the American Civil War. In 1884, he was commissioned to provide illustrations of naval scenes for the four-volume work The Battles and Leaders of the Civil War. Recognized by the National Academy of Design, two of his greatest naval paintings, The Battle of Lake Champlain and The U.S. Frigate Constitution, 'Old Ironsides' Escaping From the British Fleet were displayed at the National Academy of Design's annual art show.

The Battle of Lake Champlain (1884) hangs in the Key Bank Art Gallery in Plattsburgh, New York. He has exhibited at the Hudson River Museum, New-York Historical Society and the National Academy of Design.

Davidson was an illustrator for The Century Magazine and Harper's Weekly, as well as a series of children’s stories he wrote and illustrated for St. Nicholas Magazine. Many of his illustrations can be found in the book, The American Heritage Century collection of Civil War Art.

== Death ==
In 1893, Davidson contracted a kidney infection. During this time, he continued to work in the studio of his South Nyack home. On April 30, 1894, Davidson died at his home in Nyack at 40 years of age. He was buried in the family plot in Woodlawn Cemetery in The Bronx.

== Legacy ==
On September 11, 1986, the Historical Society of Rockland County held an exhibition titled, "Julian O. Davidson (1853-1894), American Marine Artist. Curator Lynn S. Beman said that "This exhibition constitutes a total rediscovery of this important 19th-century American marine artist."
