= Te Haupa Island =

Island in New Zealand

Native name: Te Haupa
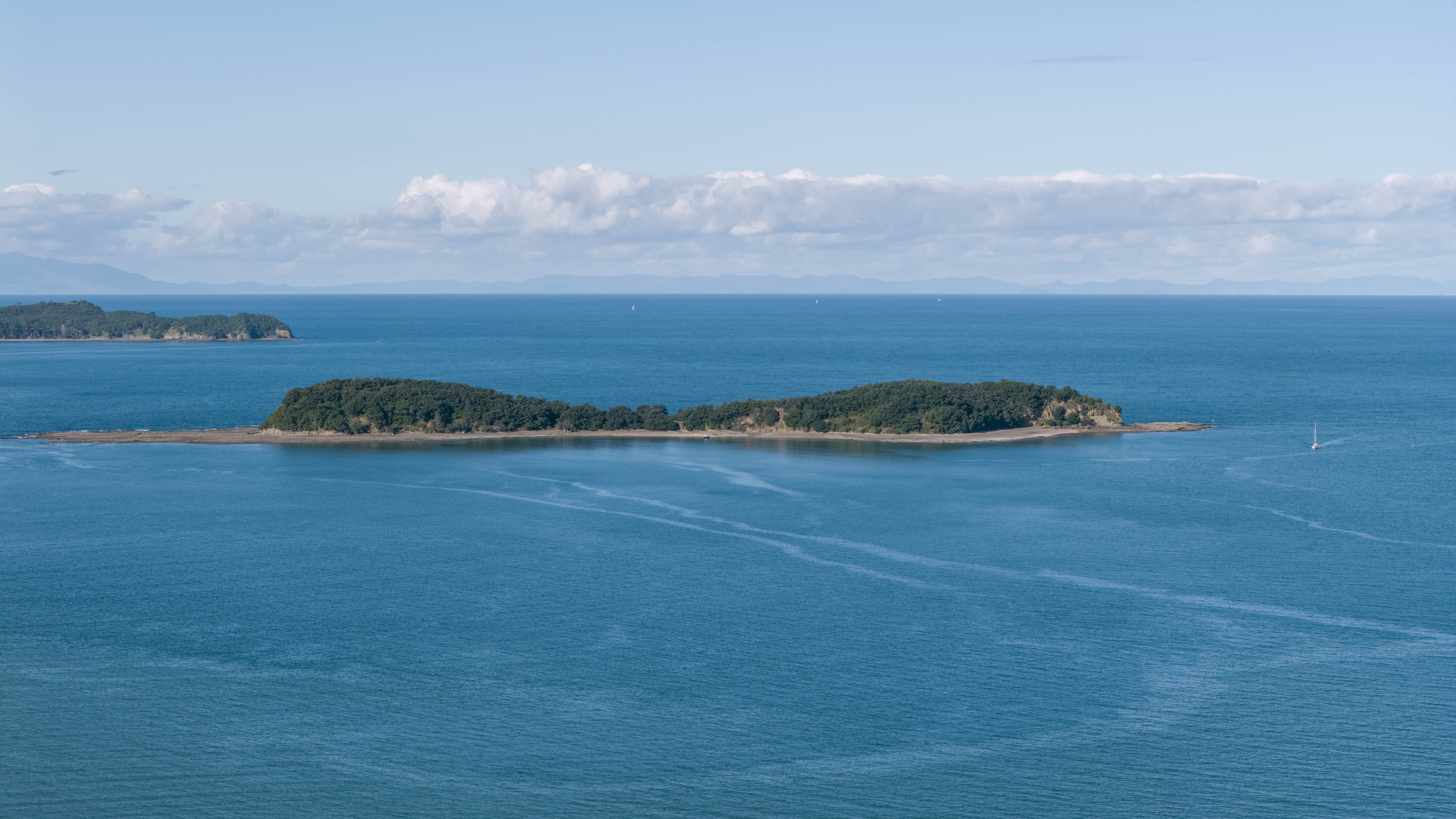
- Te Haupa Island with Motuora Island in the background
- Interactive map of Te Haupa Island
- Other names: Saddle Island

Geography
- Location: Auckland
- Coordinates: 36°30′43″S 174°44′49″E
- Adjacent to: Hauraki Gulf
- Area: 6 ha (15 acres)
- Length: 650 m (2130 ft)
- Width: 150 m (490 ft)
- Highest elevation: 35 m (115 ft)

Administration
- New Zealand

Te Haupa Island, also known as Saddle Island, is an uninhabited island located in the Hauraki Gulf near the mouth of Mahurangi Harbour, Auckland Region, New Zealand. Named after Ngāti Pāoa chief Te Haupa, the island was traditionally used as a seasonal base for shark fishing. The island first became a reserve in 1951.

== Geography ==
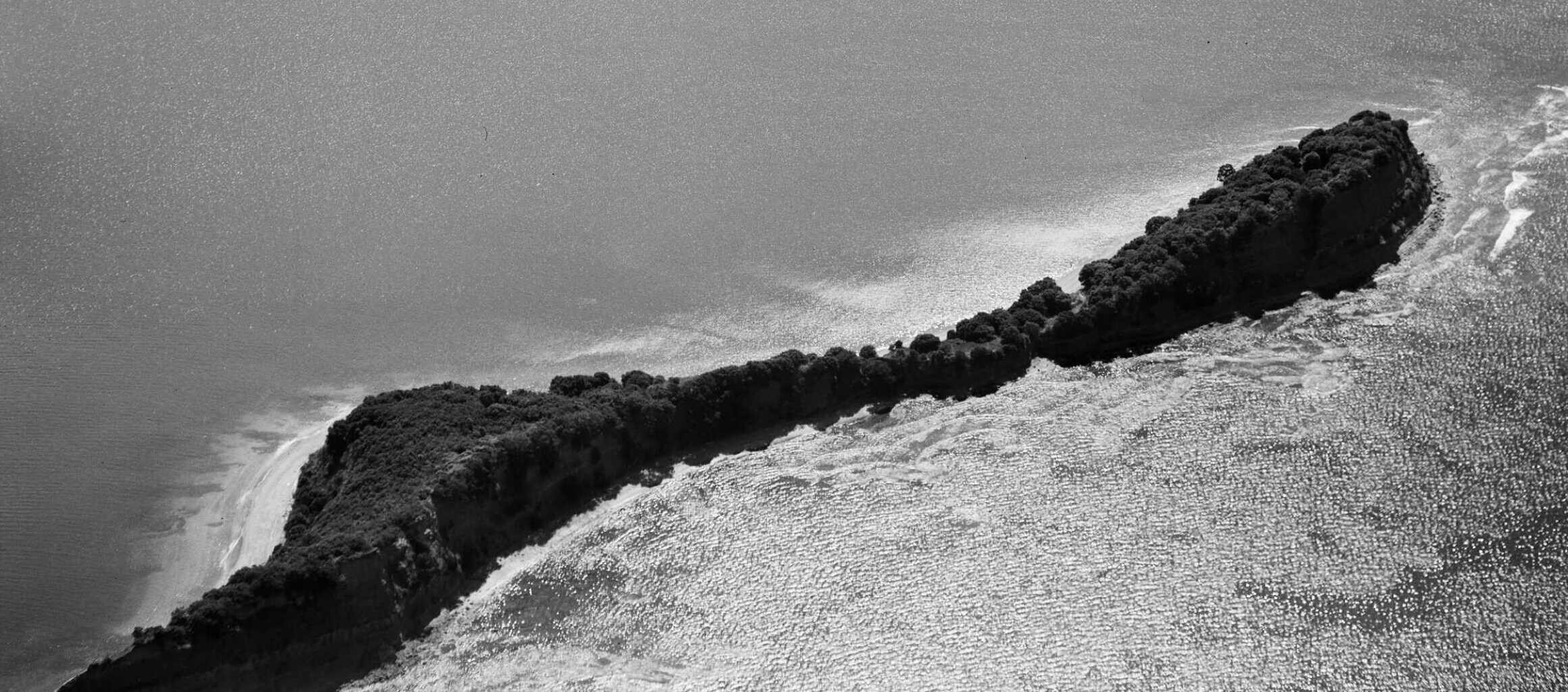
Aerial view of Te Haupa Island in 1958

The island is located 950 m (3,120 ft) east of the mouth of the Mahurangi Harbour, west of Motuora Island, featuring two raised areas connected by a low-lying saddle. The island is formed from Waitemata Group sandstone and mudstone. The western side of the island is sandy, while the eastern is dominated by tall cliffs.

== Biodiversity ==
Much of the island is covered by pōhutukawa forest. Great-winged petrels roost on the island. Other known bird species include little blue penguins and white-fronted terns.

== History ==
The island was named after Te Haupa, an 18th and 19th century Ngāti Pāoa chief known to have slain Tarahawaiki of Te Taoū, who often spent time on the island. Archaeological evidence of Māori middens and ovens has been found on the island, and traditional histories describe the island as surrounded by areas known for shark fishing, and the island was used as a base during shark fishing season.

On 9 August 1864, the schooner Swallow ran aground on the island.

A large fire around the year 1945 removed almost all vegetation from the island. The island became a recreation reserve in 1951, later becoming a part of the Hauraki Gulf Maritime Park in 1968. In 1978, a large amount of sand was dredged from the island. The reserve was retitled Te Haupa (Saddle) Island Scenic Reserve in 1981.
