= William Bell, No. 24 =

Sandy Hook pilot boat

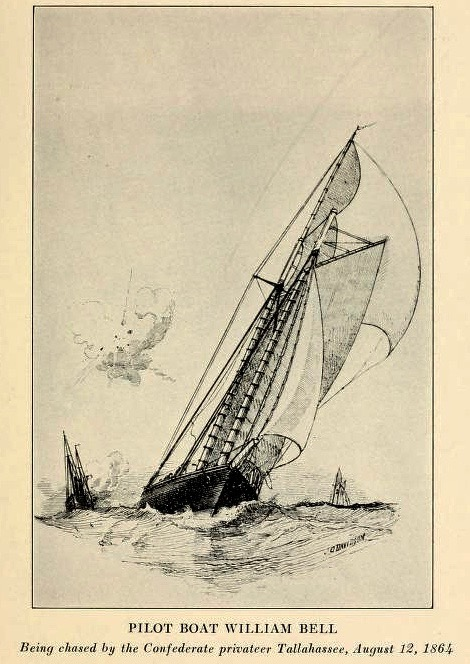
- William Bell, No. 24

History

United States
- Name: William Bell
- Owner: N.Y. Pilots: Joseph Henderson, William H. Anderson, John Van Dusen, and James Callahan
- Operator: James Callahan
- Builder: Edward F. Williams
- Cost: $16,000
- Launched: January 9, 1964
- Acquired: 1864
- In service: circa 1864 - 1867
- Out of service: sank at sea
- Stricken: 1867 (est.)
- Captured: 1864

General characteristics
- Displacement: 118 ton
- Length: 82 ft 0 in (24.99 m)
- Beam: 22 ft 6 in (6.86 m)
- Draught: 8 ft 0 in (2.44 m)
- Propulsion: sails
- Sail plan: Schooner-rigged
- Complement: 1864, 1865

The William Bell was a pilot boat built in 1864 by shipbuilder Edward F. Williams at Greenpoint, Brooklyn for a group Sandy Hook Pilots. She was captured and burned by the Confederate raiding steamer CSS Tallahassee during the American Civil War. A second William Bell was constructed in 1864–1865 to replace the first one.

== Construction and service ==
The William Bell was built in Greenpoint, Brooklyn, New York, in 1864 and launched on January 9, 1864, by shipbuilder Edward F. Williams of Greenpoint for the New York and Sandy Hook pilots: Joseph Henderson, William H. Anderson, John Van Dusen, and James Callahan. Williams sold the plans of the William Bell for $250, to the Delaware pilots.

Her dimensions were 82 ft. in length; 22.6 ft. breadth of beam; 8 ft. depth of hold; and 118-tons.

The William Bell was an expensive boat. She was built of white oak, live oak, red cedar, locust, hackmatack, yellow pine, and white pine. Her deck was "without a butt or knot," fastened with galvanized spikes, and was made of long and fine planking. All trimmings on deck were of mahogany or brass; her cabin was of "rose wood, zebra wood, tulip and satin wood."

== Civil War ==
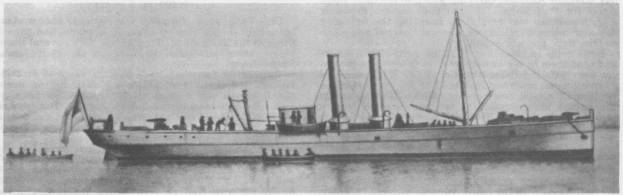
Confederate cruiser and blockade runner CSS Tallahassee.

James Callahan was in command of the pilot boat at the time of the capture. The Confederate colonel, John Taylor Wood, fired three shots at the William Bell and ordered Callahan to come on board the Tallahassee. He then ordered his men to go on board the pilot boat and remove everything that was movable and bring it on board the Tallahassee. Wood then ordered the William Bell to be burned. Wood said "Turpentine her and set her on fire." The next day, Colonel Wood collided with packet ship Adriatic. Wood ordered every passenger on the Adriatic to be taken prisoner and put on the Tallahassee. He then captured another vessel, the bark Suliote, of Belfast, Maine. Passengers from the pilot boat William Bell, No. 24 and the burned ship Adriatic were transferred to the Suliote. James Callahan was ordered to pilot the Suliote into Sandy Hook, New York.

In the book, "From Sandy Hook to 62", Charles Edward Russell, described the chase of the Tallahassee cruiser against James Funk, No. 22. The Tallahassee captured the James Funk and turned her into a tender and a decoy. Captain Wood used the pilot-boat to capture and burn other schooners and brigs. He then burned the James Funk, which he later regretted.

== Out of service (1867) ==
On March 4, 1867, the pilot boat William Bell, No. 24, lay full of water, a mile inside of the outer bar, eighteen miles east of Montauk Point, near the village of Amagansett, Long Island. There were four pilots on board at the time she struck the beach in bad weather. She was part owned by Captain Joseph Henderson (5/16th); James Callahan (5/16); John Van Duzer (4/17); and William Anderson (2/16). She was partially insured. The vessel was reported as a total loss.

== Compensation for their loss ==
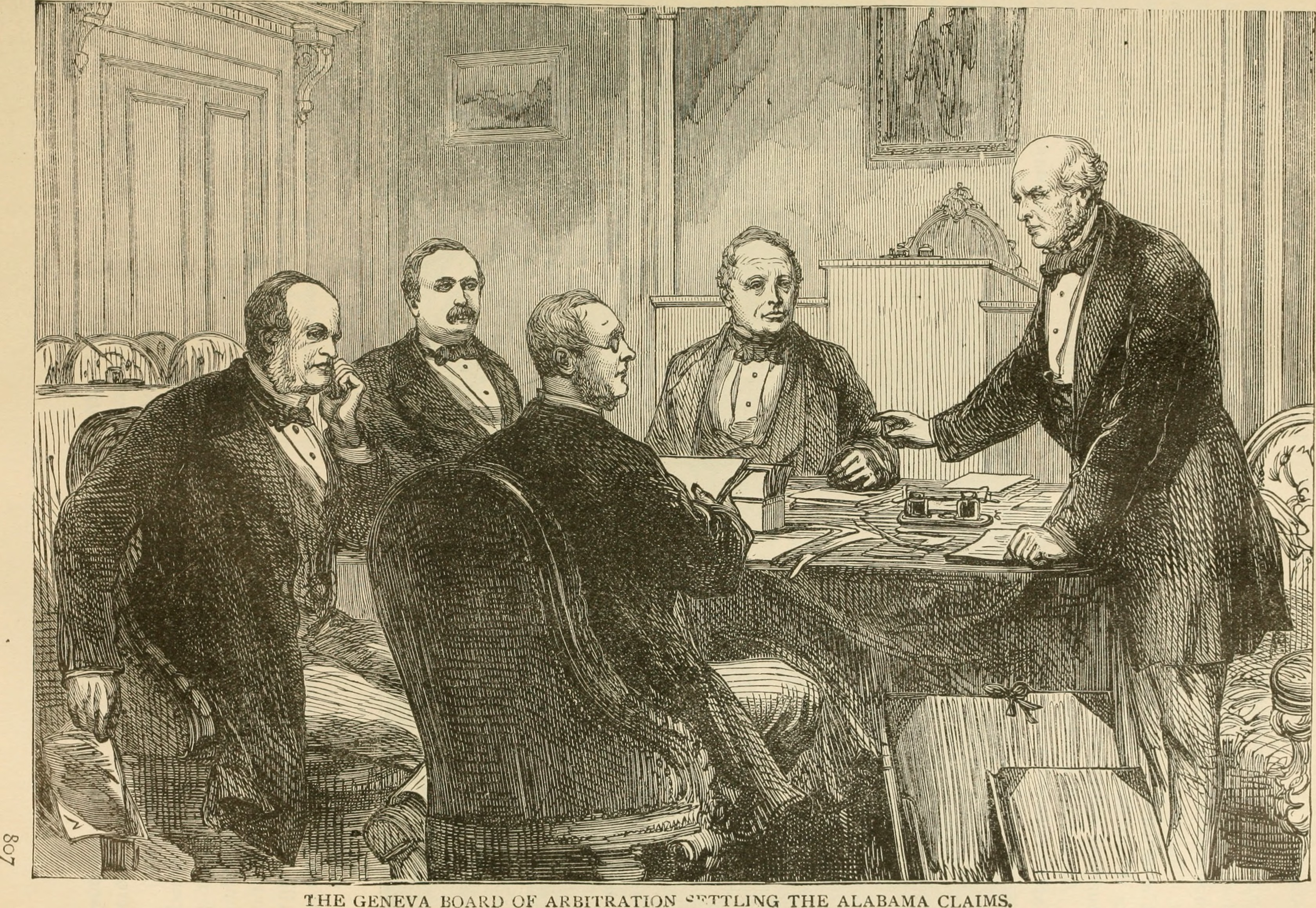
The Geneva Board of Arbitration settling the Alabama Claims.

On February 17, 1883, Henderson and Callahan petitioned the United States, via the Alabama Claims award, for compensation of their loss of the William Bell during the American Civil War. Joseph Henderson v. United States gives more information on these cases. Henderson and Callahan had to testify to their ownership and status as Sandy Hook pilots during the Court of Commissioners of Alabama Claims. The final award, made on June 5, 1883, gave compensation for a total award of $18,699.73 (equivalent to $631,058 in 2024). Although, this was less than the $24,000.00 amount claimed, it was a reasonable settlement.

== See also ==
- List of Northeastern U. S. Pilot Boats
