= Isaac Webb (shipbuilder) =

American shipbuilder

- Born: September 8, 1794; Stamford, Connecticut, US
- Died: January 14, 1840 (aged 45); New York City, US
- Occupation: Shipbuilder
- Children: William Henry Webb, Eckford Webb

Isaac Webb (8 September 1794 - 14 January 1840), was a 19th-century shipbuilder, owner and founder of the Isaac Webb & Co. shipyard. He was one of the founders of shipbuilding in the United States.

== Early life ==
Isaac Webb was born in Stamford, Fairfield, Connecticut, on September 8, 1794. He was the son of Wilsey Webb and Sarah Jessup. Isaac and Phebe had four children. Their son, Eckford Webb was named after the shipbuilder, Henry Eckford. His son, William H. Webb, became a shipbuilder.

== Isaac Webb shipyards ==
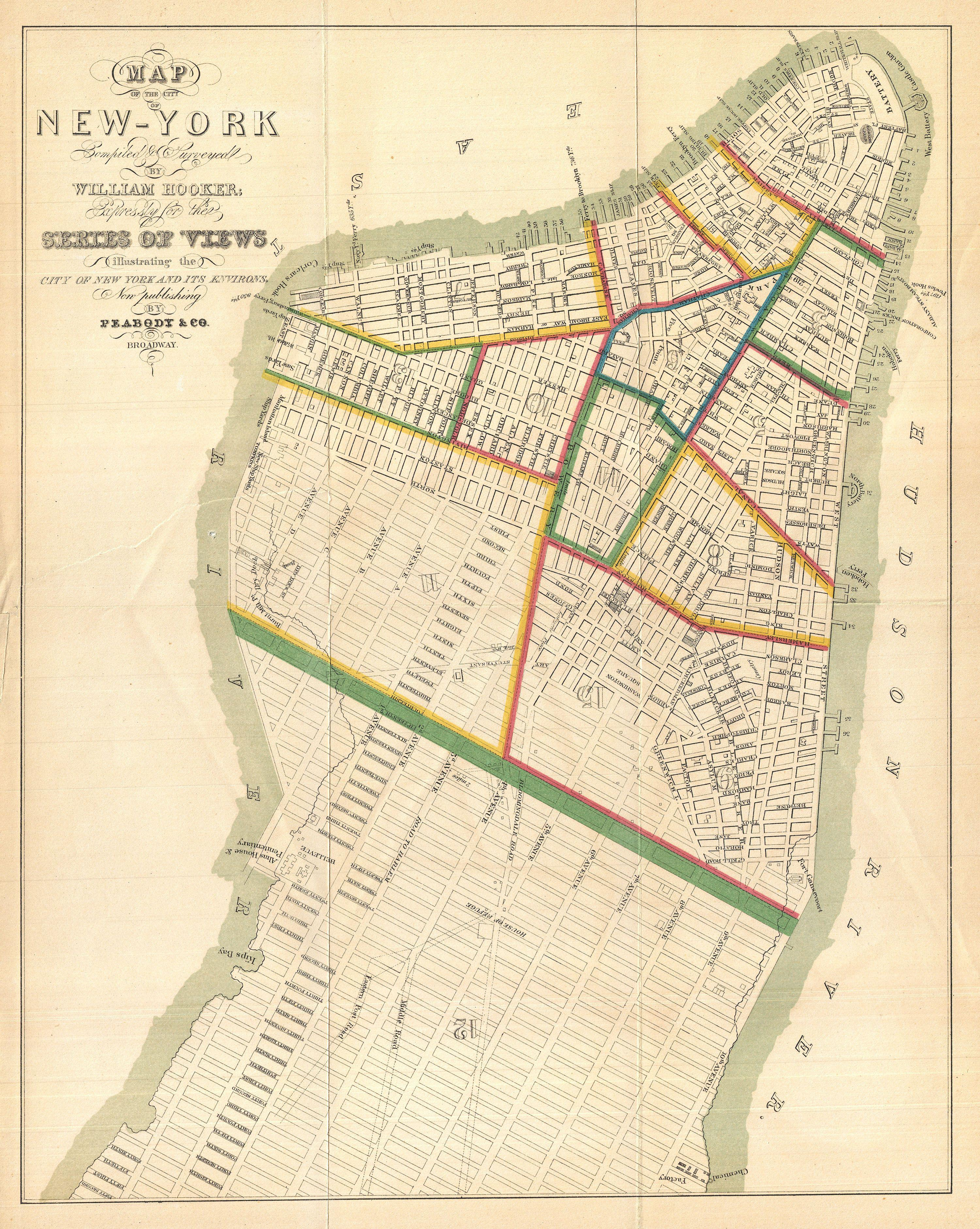
Somewhere near Corlears Hook Isaac Webb founded shipyard Isaac Webb & Co. Map of New-York in 1831.

In September 1810, Henry Eckford took on the 16-year-old Isaac Webb as an apprentice at his shipyard in New York. In the following years, Eckford would take on many other apprentices who would become important naval architects and shipbuilders, including Jacob Bell, William Bennett, David Brown, Andrew Craft, John Dimon, John Englis, Thomas Megson, Stephen Smith, and Sidney Wright.

=== Isaac Webb & Co. ===
After completing his training Webb opened his own shipyard, Isaac Webb & Co., near Corlears Hook, New York City in about 1818, later relocating to Stanton Street. In 1822, Isaac Webb built the three-masted ship Superior for the Black Ball Line.

=== Webb & Allen ===
Webb eventually took on a partner, John Allen, and the shipyard was renamed Webb & Allen in 1825. The shipyard continued to operate in the 1830s. The packet ship Natchez, was built by Web in 1831 for Captain Waterman. The pilot-boat John McKeon, was built in 1838 by Webb & Allen for the New Jersey pilots.

For the first couple of years at the helm, the Webb & Allen shipyard, relocated between Fifth and Seventh Streets on the East River, built a variety of mostly small sailing ships, including ferries, sloops and schooners.

Two other apprentices, Jacob Bell and David Brown founded the Brown & Bell shipyard in New York and built the famous sidewheel steamer USS Jacob Bell.

== Death ==
On 14 January 1840, Webb died in New York City, at the age of 46, of inflammation of the lungs.

Upon examining the accounts his son, William Webb, discovered that his father's business was technically insolvent, and thus one of his first duties was to settle his father's debts. Having done so, he set about reinvigorating the business. In 1843, William bought out his father's old partner John Allen and subsequently renamed the business William H. Webb shipyard.

== Webb & Bell shipyard ==
In 1848, Isaac's son, Eckford Webb, teamed up with George W. Bell and created the Webb & Bell shipyard at Milton Street in Greenpoint, Brooklyn. The company produced many ships, gunboats, and pilot boats. On October 31, 1860, the 100-ton pilot-boat Isaac Webb, No. 8, was built by Webb & Bell for the New York and Sandy Hook pilots.

The pilot boat Charlotte Webb was built in May 1865 at the Webb & Bell shipyard.

During the American Civil War the government used his pilot boats as blockade runners. The most noted gunboat was the Chippewa built in 1861. After the Civil War, the firm built several of the Pacific Mail steamers. In 1871, the firm built and sank the underwater Caissons used for the foundation of the Brooklyn Bridge.
