= CSS Tallahassee =

Confederate Navy cruiser and steamer

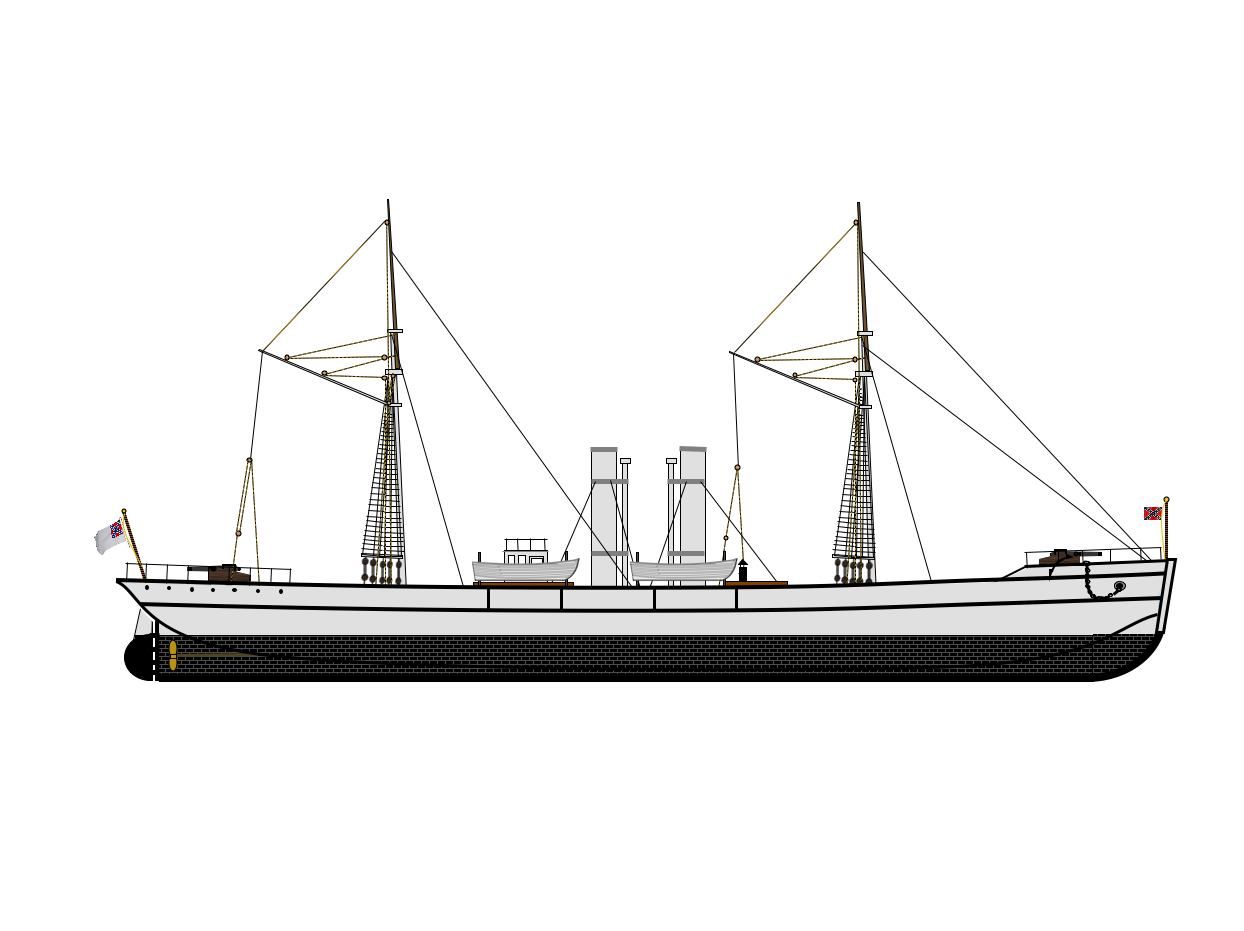
- CSS Tallahassee

History

Confederate States
- Name: Tallahassee
- Builder: J & W Dudgeon, Cubitt Town, London
- Commissioned: 20 July 1864
- Renamed: CSS Olustee
- Fate: Wrecked 21 July 1869

General characteristics
- Displacement: 700 tons
- Length: 220 ft (67 m)
- Beam: 24 ft (7.3 m)
- Draft: 14 ft (4.3 m)
- Propulsion: 2 – 100 h.p steam engines. 2 screws. Mast and sails
- Speed: 15 knots (28 km/h; 17 mph)
- Complement: 120
- Armament: 1 rifled 32 pounder forward, 1 rifled 100 pounder amidship, 1 heavy Parrot aft

The CSS Tallahassee was a twin-screw steamer and cruiser in the Confederate States Navy, purchased in 1864, and used for commerce raiding off the Atlantic coast. She later operated under the names CSS Olustee and CSS Chameleon.

== History ==
The iron Confederate cruiser Tallahassee was named after the Confederate state capital of Tallahassee in Florida and was built on the River Thames by J & W Dudgeon of Cubitt Town, London for London, Chatham & Dover Rly. Co. to the design of Capt. T. E. Symonds, Royal Navy, ostensibly for the Chinese opium trade. She was previously the blockade runner Atalanta and made the Dover-Calais crossing in 77 minutes on an even keel. She had made several blockade runs between Bermuda and Wilmington, N.C. before the Confederates bought her.

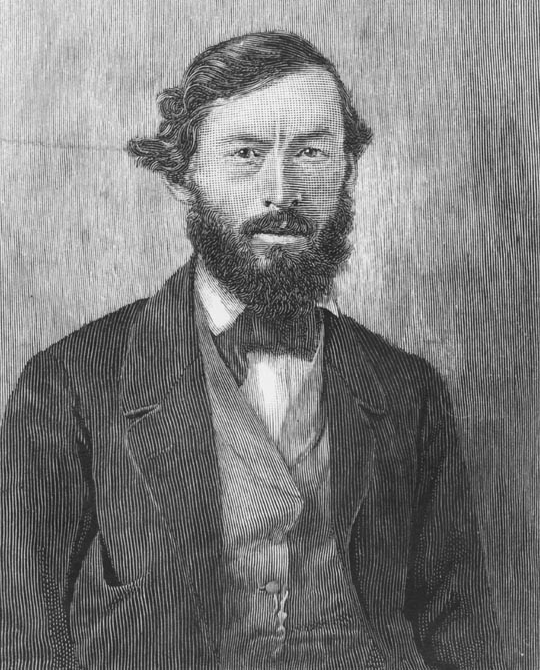
John Taylor Wood

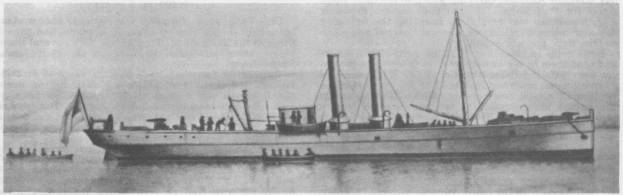
Confederate cruiser and blockade runner CSS Tallahassee.

After the Tallahassee was commissioned and prepared for sea she was placed under Commander John Taylor Wood, CSN. Wood was a grandson of President Zachary Taylor and a nephew of Jefferson Davis, who at the time was President of the Confederate States of America. The officers and crew were all volunteers from the Confederate gunboats on the James River and North Carolina waters.

The Tallahassee went through the blockade on 6 August 1864 from her home port of Wilmington, North Carolina. Her first day out, four cruisers chased the Tallahassee without incident.

She made a 19-day raid off the Atlantic coast as far north as Halifax, Nova Scotia. The Tallahassee destroyed 26 vessels and captured 7 others that were bonded or released. Wood sailed the Tallahassee into Halifax Harbour on 18 August to take on bunker coal and water. Neutrality laws limited her stay in Halifax to 24 hours. Tallahassee was granted an extra 12 hours to fix a broken mast but was only allowed to load enough coal to take her to the nearest Confederate port. Two Federal war ships, the USS Nansemond and USS Huron, were rumoured to be waiting for the Tallahassee at the harbour entrance. Wood hired legendary Halifax pilot John "Jock" Flemming, who guided the warship through the narrow and shallow Eastern Passage between Dartmouth and Lawlor Island, a route only suited for small fishing vessels. Tallahassee succeeded in negotiating the passage out of the harbour, although no Northern warships were in fact waiting. The first Northern warship, the gunboat USS Pontoosuc, arrived at the harbour entrance several hours after the Confederate cruiser departed.

Being unable to procure enough coal to continue, Wood was forced to return to Wilmington where he arrived safely on 26 August.

== Prizes ==
1. The schooner Sarah A. Boice of Great Egg Harbor, N.J.; A.S. Adams, master; 381 tons. Her crew and their personal effects were brought on board, and she was scuttled. The Boice failed to sink, however, presumably because she was in ballast. She came ashore at Fire Island Inlet on Long Island, where she was salvaged and was reclaimed by her owners (after being ransacked by her "salvors", resulting in litigation) and was put back into service.
2. The pilot-boat schooner James Funk, No. 22 of New York; Robert Yates, master; 120 tons. Was turned into a tender of the Tallahassee using 20 of the Tallahassee's crew.
3. The bark Bay State of Boston; Thomas Sparrow, master; bound from Alexandria to New York, with wood; 199 tons; burned.
4. The brigantine Carrie Estelle of Grand Manan, New Brunswick; Mark Thurlow, master; bound from Grand Manan to New York, with logs; 248 tons; burned.
5. The brigantine A. Richards of Boston; Charles Dunovant, master; from Glace Bay, Cape Breton Island to New York, with coal; 274 tons; burned.
6. The schooner Carroll of East Machias, Maine; ____ Sprague, master; ___ tons; taken by the Tallahassee's tender James Funk; bonded in the sum of $10,000 and released.
7. The pilot-boat schooner William Bell, No. 24 of New York; James Callahan, master; 123 tons; burned.
8. The packet ship Adriatic of New York, from London, England to New York, with emigrants; 989 tons; burned. During the seizure, the Tallahassee collided with her losing her main mast.
9. The bark Glenavon of Thomaston, Maine; James Watt, master; from Greenock, Scotland, to New York; 789 tons; scuttled.
10. The ship James Littlefield of Bangor, Maine; H.N. Bartlett, master; from Cardiff, Wales, to New York, with coal; 547 tons; scuttled.
11. The schooner Atlantic of Addison, Maine; P.W. Look, master; from Addison to New York; 156 tons; burned.
12. The schooner Spokane of Fremont, ?; C.H. Sayer, master; from Calais, Maine to New York, with lumber; 126 tons; burned.
13. The schooner Billow of Salem, Mass.; M.A. Reed, master; from Calais, Maine to New York, with lumber; 173 tons; scuttled.
14. The bark Suilote; (no other information given); bonded and released.
15. The schooner Robert E. Packer of Bath, Maine; Joseph E. Marston, master; from Baltimore to Richmond, Maine, with lumber; 222 tons; burned.
16. The schooner Lamont Du Pont of Wilmington, Del.; L. C. Corson, master; from Cow Bay. Cape Breton Island, to New York, with coal; 194 tons; burned.
17. The bark P.C. Alexander of Harpswell, Maine; A.B. Merryman, master; from New York to Pictou, Nova Scotia in ballast; 283 tons; burned.
18. The brig Neva, of East Machias, Maine; E.J. Tolbert, master; from Lingan, Nova Scotia, to New York, with coal; 286 tons; bonded in the sum of $17,500 and loaded with prisoners from the previous captures.
19. The brig Roan, of ?; C.E. Phillips, master; sailing to Cape Breton Island in ballast; 127 tons; burned.
20. 14 small schooners ranging from 39 tons to 148 tons, sunk.

== Renaming ==
=== CSS Olustee ===
The Tallahassee was renamed CSS Olustee after the Battle of Olustee in northern Florida and placed under the command of Lt. W. H. Ward, CSN. The Olustee ran through the blockade off Wilmington again on 29 October 1864 but suffered some damage from Federal guns. She captured and destroyed six ships off the Cape of Delaware before having to return for coal. She stopped attempts by USS Sassacus to capture her on 6 November 1864 and by four other United States ships on 7 November 1864 finally passing into the safety of Wilmington harbor.

=== CSS Chameleon ===
The Olustee was renamed the CSS Chameleon with Lt. John Wilkinson (CSN) commanding. The battery had been removed and she ran through the Union blockade on 24 December 1864 while the United States fleet was preoccupied with bombarding Fort Fisher. The Chameleon proceeded to Bermuda to obtain provisions for the Confederate army.

Wilkinson made two attempts to enter one of the southern ports, but finding it impossible, he took Chameleon to Liverpool, England, and turned her over to Comdr. J. D. Bullock, CSN, financial agent of the Confederate Navy Department.

On her arrival in England on 9 April 1865 the Chameleon was seized and sold by the British authorities and was about to enter the merchant service when the United States instituted suit for possession. She was awarded to the United States Government and handed over to the consul at Liverpool on 26 April 1866. Chameleon was sold at auction on orders from the consul on 14 June 1866. She sold for £6,400. On 21 July 1869, telegrams were received at New York stating that she had been wrecked near Yokohama, Japan with the loss of 22 lives.

== Legacy ==
In 1958, a new school in Eastern Passage, Nova Scotia, near Lawlor Island, was named after the Tallahassee to commemorate Flemming's 1864 navigational feat. After a replacement school with the same name was built in 1992, the name grew controversial due to the Confederacy's support of slavery. Following several community meetings, the Tallahassee Community School was renamed Horizon Elementary School in 2021.

== See also ==
- Canada in the American Civil War
- History of the Halifax Regional Municipality
- Military history of Nova Scotia
