= Margaret Evans =

Margaret Evans may refer to:

- Margaret Evans (journalist), Canadian journalist
- Margaret Evans (mayor) (born 1944), mayor of Hamilton, New Zealand, 1989–1998
- Margaret Evans (1846), a full rigged packet ship
- Margaret Evans Price (1888–1973), née Evans, artist, designer and businesswoman, one of the founders of Fisher-Price toys
- Marged ferch Ifan (1696–1793), harpist and wrestler, strong woman of Snowdonia
- Margaret Gray Evans (1830–1906), wife of territorial governor, Johns Evans

== See also ==
- Maggie Evans, fictional character
- Peggy Evans, actress
- Madge Evans, actress
