= Christian Bergh (pilot boat) =

New York Pilot boat

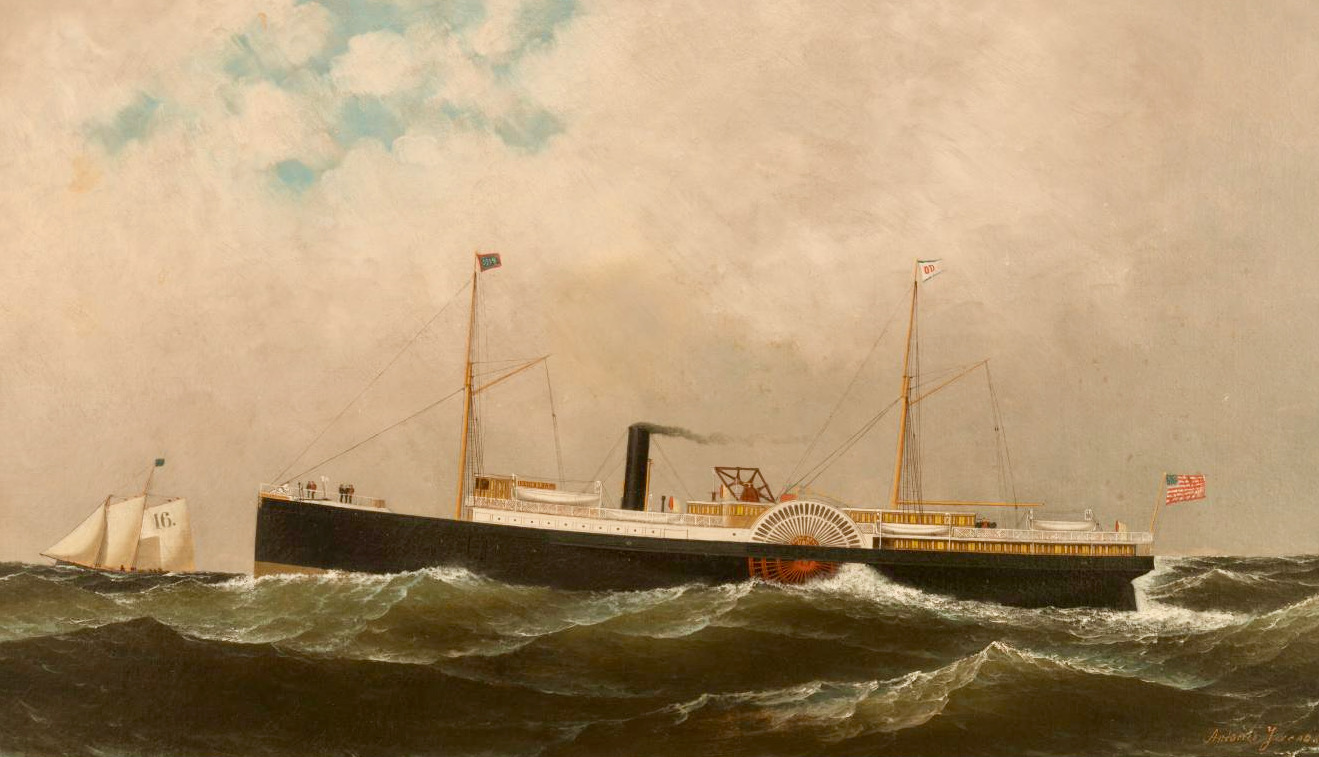
- Pilot Boat Christian Bergh, No. 16., with Line Steamer Isaac Bell; painting by Antonio Jacobsen.

History

United States
- Name: Christian Bergh
- Namesake: Christian Bergh shipbuilder of Christian Bergh & Co.
- Owner: New York pilots
- Operator: E. Comfort, Jacob Britton (1860), Josiah Johnson Sr.
- Builder: Westervelt & Co. shipyard
- Launched: Jun 14, 1851
- Out of service: September 6, 1886
- Homeport: New York
- Fate: Sold

General characteristics
- Class & type: Schooner
- Displacement: 42 tons TM
- Length: 74 ft 0 in (22.56 m)
- Beam: 18 ft 3 in (5.56 m)
- Draught: 8 ft 0 in (2.44 m)
- Propulsion: sails
- Sail plan: Schooner-rigged

The Christian Bergh was a 19th-century Sandy Hook pilot boat built in 1851 at the Westervelt & Co. shipyard. She later became a Pennsylvania pilot boat until her service ended in 1886 when she became an oyster boat in the Delaware Bay. She was named after Christian Bergh a prominent shipbuilder in New York and a close friend of Jacob Westervelt.

== Construction and service ==
New York pilot-boat Christian Bergh, No. 16 was built by Aaron J. Westervelt at the Westervelt & Co. shipyard at the East River in New York City in 1851. On June 14, 1851, she was launched from the Westervelt shipyard at the foot of Houston Street for piloting into the port of New York.

On June 16, 1851, she went down the New York Bay on her first trial trip. She was sometimes listed as the Christian Berg.

On April 2, 1855, the Christian Bergh, No. 16, met up with the pilot boat Edwin Forrest, when the Forrest was on a trial trip near the Sandy Hook Lightship. On their return to port, both pilots were able to test the speed and strength of their boats.

In 1860, the Christian Bergh, was one of twenty-one New York and New Jersey pilot boats. Josiah Johnson Sr., owned shares in the Christian Bergh. On October 10, 1860, New York Sandy Hook Pilot Jacob Britton, of the pilot boat Christian Bergh, No. 1, signed a statement along with other pilots, that he was satisfied with the representation he had received from the New York Board of Commissioners of Pilots.

On March 10, 1860, the pilot boat Christian Bergh, No. 16, picked up passengers on the packet ship De Witt Clinton, and took them to quarantine.

The Christian Bergh, was registered with the Record of American and Foreign Shipping from 1881 to 1897. In 1881, Electus Comfort was listed as Master of the ship; New York Pilots were owners; built in New York in 1851; and New York was her hailing port. Her dimensions were 74 ft. length on deck; 66 ft. length on keel: 18.3 ft. breadth of beam; 8 ft. depth of hold; 42-tons burthen.

From 1882 to 1897, according to ship records, the owner of the Christian Bergh, changed to Captain W. W. Andrews and her hailing port became Baltimore, Maryland.

== Out of service ==
On September 6, 1886, the pilot boat Christian Bergh, was reported as a Pennsylvania pilot boat that was taken off her pilot station. She was then rebuilt and fitted out for new service. She then became an oyster boat in the Delaware Bay on Dec 1, 1886.

== See also ==
- Pilot boats
- List of Northeastern U. S. Pilot Boats
