= Sweepstake (disambiguation) =

A sweepstake is a form of gambling where the entire prize may be awarded to the winner.

Sweepstakes may also refer to:

- Sweepstakes (film), an American comedy
- "Sweepstakes" (song), by British band Gorillaz
- Sweepstakes (TV series) (stylized as $weepstake$), a short-lived, mid-season replacement television series from 1979
- Sweepstakes (clipper), an 1853 clipper ship in the California trade
- Sweepstakes (schooner), a Canadian schooner built in Burlington, Ontario in 1867
