= Cholera Hospital =

Hospital in New York City, United States

Cholera Hospital was established on June 24, 1854, at Franklin Street in New York City. The institution was built to treat cholera patients who were denied admittance to City Hospital in Manhattan during an onset of the disease in the summer of 1854. The Mayor of New York, Jacob Westervelt, and the New York City Commissioners, took control of the building at 105 Franklin Street in anticipation of an eminent cholera epidemic. A few weeks afterward a second hospital for cholera patients was opened at a schoolhouse on Mott Street in Manhattan. A book published by a New York physician in 1835 shows that a hospital called the Duane-Street Cholera Hospital existed in New York as early as 1835, but the relationship between the Duane Street hospital and the Cholera Hospital at Franklin Street is unclear.

== Death statistics ==
Of the 696 patients admitted at both sites, there was a high mortality rate, numbering approximately one half of the persons treated. 265 people succumbed at Cholera Hospital (Franklin Street) and 57 died at the Mott Street hospital. 323 patients recovered from the sickness. New York City's population numbered around 600,000 people in 1854. The total number of cholera cases was well below the nearly 5,000 reported in 1849.

== Quarantine advised by physicians ==
Dr. Valey and Dr. Gull, who treated New York City cholera patients at this time, reported that cholera was only contagious when persons came in contact with those who are sick already. They believed that the disease was transmitted when people breathed the air which cholera patients exhaled. The physicians recommended an airy environment for those with the illness. Affected people should be kept away from marshes, garbage, and dirty water. They recommended the ill be quarantined at Cholera Hospital. It was selected by the New York City Board of Health to provide the care the doctors desired for their patients.

== Public meeting ==
On the evening of July 14, 1854, a meeting of citizens was held in the 5th Ward of Manhattan. Arguments were voiced in opposition to the Franklin Street establishment. People disliked the confining atmosphere, the uncleanliness, and the densely settled surroundings in close proximity to the building at the 105 Franklin address. These factors posed risks during an outbreak of contagious disease.

None of the people who attended the gathering wanted to stop attending to the needs of cholera patients. Instead the consensus was for opening hospitals in each ward in New York City. This would expedite the care of infected persons who could be treated immediately following the onset of cholera symptoms.

It was falsely reported that Cholera Hospital received patients with smallpox, typhus, and other contagious diseases. There were inaccurate stories of disturbing the peace of the neighborhood caused by the rapping of hammers of workers constructing coffins.

== Daily reports and epidemic dissipation ==
The Physician of Cholera Hospital published daily reports of the number of cholera cases received at the Franklin Street facility. An average of twelve new cases per day were being treated in mid July 1854. In late August 1854 New York City Commissioners of Health decided to stop reporting news of cholera infections, so greatly had the frequency of new cases declined in New York City. Visitors to the city were no longer dissuaded from coming and commerce was reestablished as the panic dissipated.

== Treatment chronicle ==
Joseph C. Hutchison, M.D., treated people with Asiatic cholera at the Brooklyn, New York Cholera Hospital in 1854. He published an account of his work in the New York Journal of Medicine in 1855.

Hutchison administered a simple treatment to alleviate cholera symptoms. Patients were given an emetic of salt and water to stop their vomiting and ease their stomachs. This enabled additional remedies to be given to them. Each received a single grain of calomel every hour. It was sprinkled on the backs of their tongues and washed down with ice water. Salivation was avoided. When stimulants were required, sulphuric ether was used. The amount needed depended upon its effects on the individual. Hot air baths, blistering, and spirits of turpentine (turpentine) were utilized externally, when necessary.
