= Alexander M. Lawrence =

Sandy Hook Pilot boat

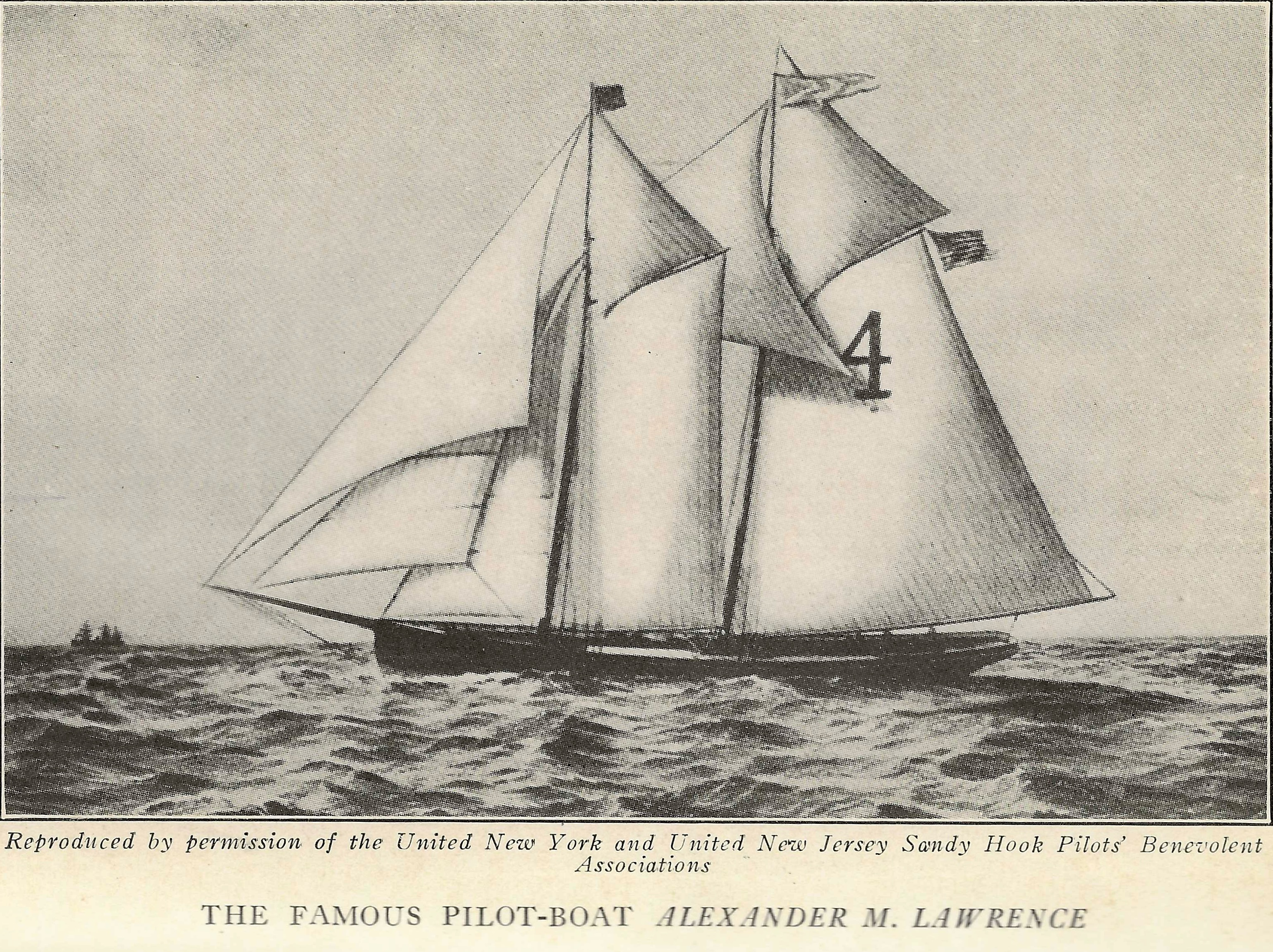
- Alexander M. Lawrence

History

United States
- Name: Alexander M. Lawrence
- Owner: N. Y. Pilots (1881-1885); A. C. Bruner (1898-1900)
- Operator: Michael Murphy (1881-1885); H. B. Cogswell (1898-1900)
- Builder: C. & R. Poillon shipyard
- Cost: $16,000
- Launched: 21 May 1879
- Out of service: 10 September 1897

General characteristics
- Class & type: schooner
- Tonnage: 87 Thames Measurement
- Length: 97 ft 0 in (29.57 m)
- Beam: 22 ft 11 in (6.99 m)
- Depth: 9 ft 0 in (2.74 m)
- Propulsion: Sail
- Sail plan: 75 ft 6 in (23.01 m)
- Notes: Stern of white oak, with live oak aprons and hooks. Floors are double Maryland oak

Alexander M. Lawrence was the last of the 19th-century sailing schooners to be in the New York pilot boat service as a station boat. She was one of the largest and fastest in the Sandy Hook fleet. She was built to take the place of the New York pilot-boat Abraham Leggett, No. 4, that was hit by the steamship Naples, in 1879. Her boat model won a medal at the 1893 Chicago World's Fair illustrating the perils of the pilot-boat service. In the age of steam, the Lawrence was sold by the Pilots' Association to the Pacific Mining and Trading Company in 1897.

== Construction and service ==
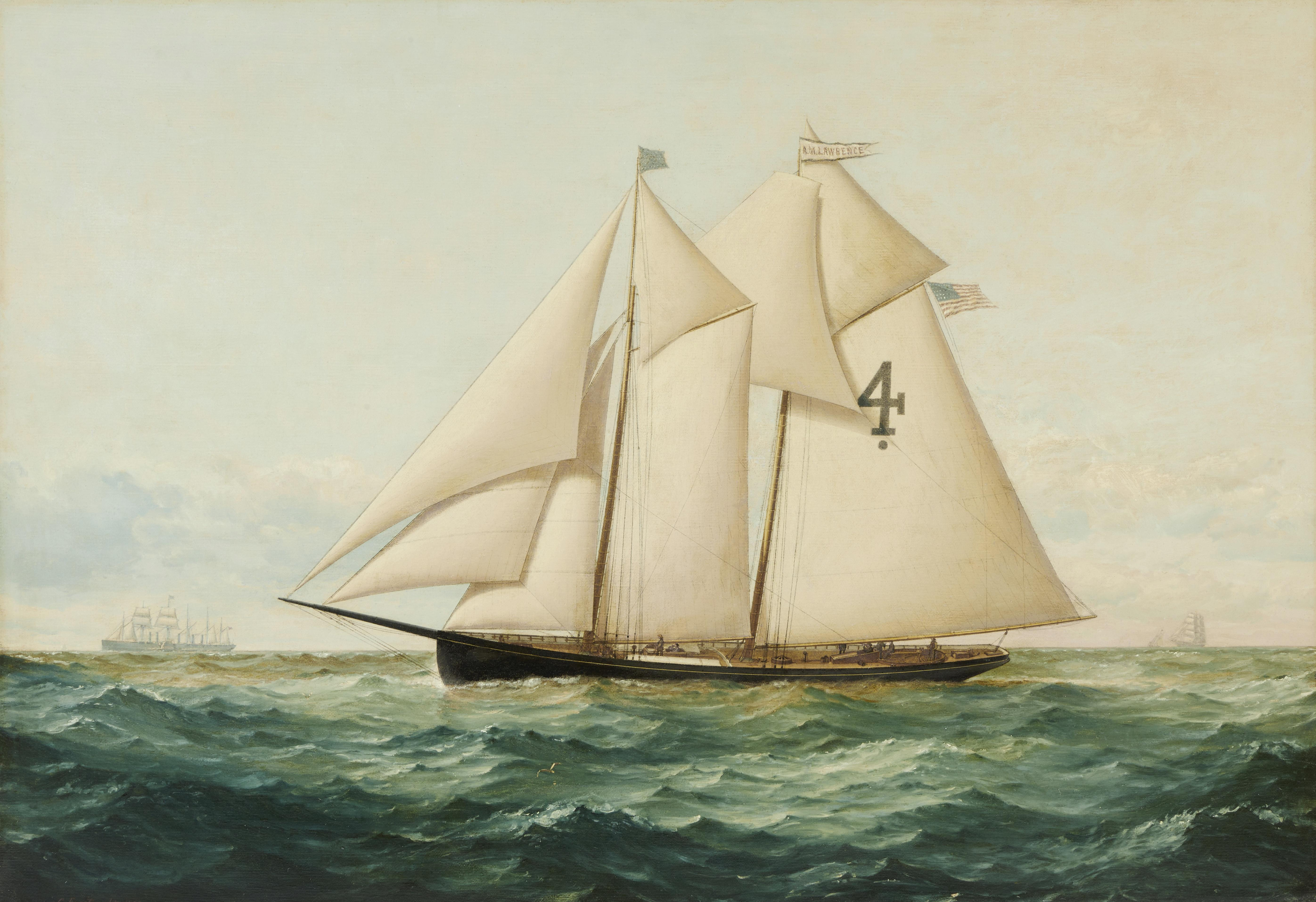
Pilot boat Alexander M. Lawrence, painting by Conrad Freitag.

On May 21, 1879, the new 87-ton pilot-boat Alexander M. Lawrence, was launched from the shipyard C. & R. Poillon in Brooklyn, New York at Bridge Street. She was built for Admiral Michael Murphy and his partners. The Lawrence replaced the New York pilot-boat Abraham Leggett, No. 4, that was hit by the steamship Naples, in 1879.

The Alexander M. Lawrence, was registered as a pilot Schooner with the Record of American and Foreign Shipping, from 1881 to 1900. Her ship master was Michael Murphy (1881–1885) and H. B. Cogswell (1898–1900); her owners were N. Y. Pilots; built in 1879 at Brooklyn, New York; and her hailing port was the Port of New York.

On May 19, 1885, boatkeeper Sullivan reported that the Lawrence, No. 4, was about 20 miles east of Nantucket when a black whale ran headlong into the port bow of the vessel. None were hurt in the narrow escape of the Lawrence.

The Lawrence was one of the representative pilot boats of the fleet and her pilot-boat model was exhibited by the Pilot Commission of New York at the 1893 Chicago World's Fair along with oil paintings illustrating the perils of the service. Her model won a medal at the Fair. She was one of the largest and fastest in the Sandy Hook fleet.

In 1895, the pilot-boat Alexander M. Lawrence, Number 4 was on duty as a station boat when the first steam pilot-boat New York went into service near the Lightship Ambrose off Sandy Hook.

On July 15, 1897, during a bad storm, the Alexander M. Lawrence, rescued the crew of the sinking Virginia sloop Fawn off the Sandy Hook lightvessel.

== Out of service ==
On September 10, 1897, the Alexander M. Lawrence was sold by the Pilots' Association to the Pacific Mining and Trading Company. From 1898 to 1900, her pilot was H. B. Cogswell.

== See also ==
- List of Northeastern U. S. Pilot Boats
