= George W. Blunt (ship) =

Pilot boat

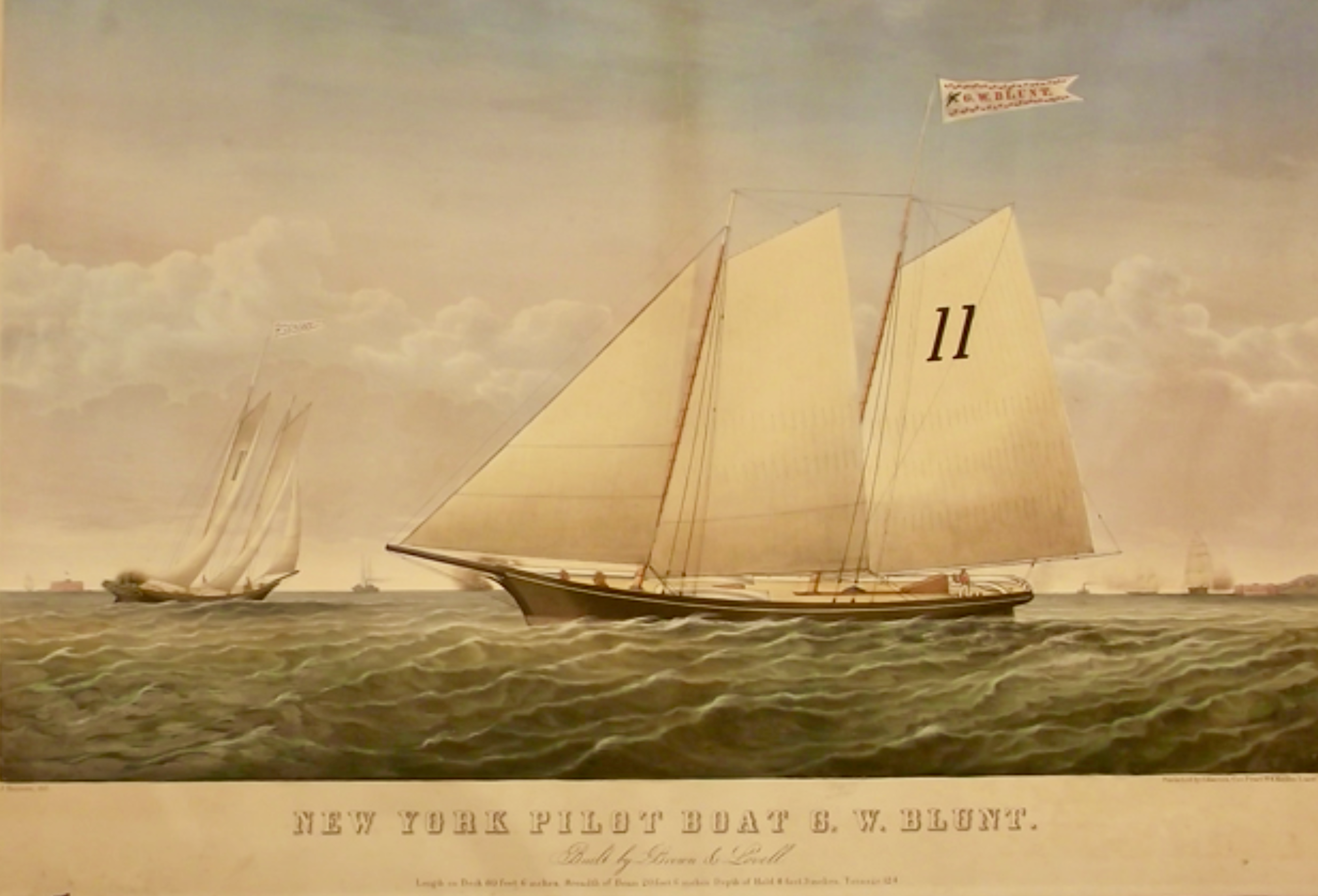
- George W. Blunt pilot boat (1860).

History

United States
- Name: George W. Blunt (1856 — 1861); G. W. Blunt (1861 — 1865)
- Namesake: George W. Blunt, nautical publisher
- Owner: New York pilots Joseph Henderson, James Callahan (1856 — 1861); U.S. government (1861 — 1865)
- Operator: Joseph Henderson and James Callahan (1856 — 1861); U.S. Navy (1861 — 1865)
- Builder: Daniel Westervelt of New York City
- Launched: 6 September 1856
- Acquired: by Navy 23 November 1861
- Commissioned: 4 December 1861
- Decommissioned: 16 August 1865
- In service: circa 1856 – 1865
- Out of service: 16 August 1865
- Home port: New York
- Nickname(s): Blunt
- Fate: Sold, Port Royal, S.C., 20 October 1865

General characteristics 1st Blunt
- Class & type: Schooner
- Displacement: 122 tons
- Length: 85 feet
- Beam: 21 feet
- Propulsion: sails
- Sail plan: Schooner-rigged

History

United States
- Name: George W. Blunt (2nd pilot schooner)
- Owner: New York Pilots
- Operator: John Phelan
- Port of registry: New York
- Builder: Brown & Lovell, Boston, Massachusetts
- Cost: $8,000
- Completed: 1861
- Acquired: 1861
- Identification: Official Number 10423
- Fate: wrecked in 1875

General characteristics 2nd George W. Blunt
- Class & type: Schooner
- Tonnage: 52 tons
- Length: 75.4 feet
- Beam: 20.4 feet
- Depth: 8.6 feet
- Propulsion: sails
- Sail plan: Schooner-rigged

George W. Blunt, completed in 1856, was a schooner built in New York that operated as a New York Sandy Hook pilot boat designated Pilot Boat No. 11. (Note: For an illustration of how the number was used see Mary Taylor pilot boat illustration.) The schooner was used to pilot vessels to and from the Port of New York and New Jersey. That schooner was sold to the United States Navy in 1861, renamed and commissioned as the USS G. W. Blunt (1856), serving in the South Atlantic Blockading Squadron in the South. A second schooner, also named George W. Blunt, was built in East Boston in 1861 and purchased to replace the first schooner as a pilot boat.

== First George W. Blunt pilot boat ==
=== Construction and service ===
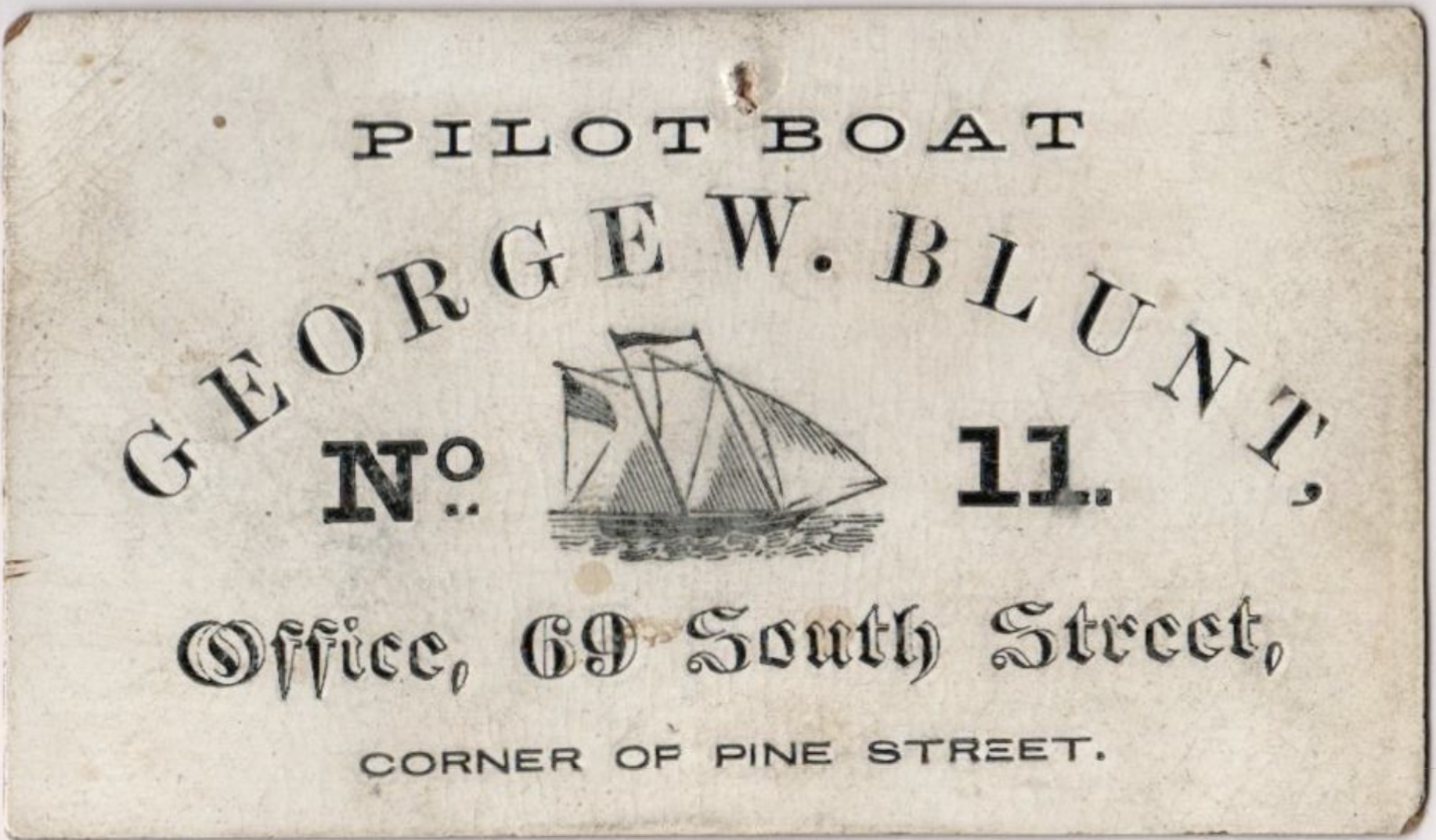
Business card, George W. Blunt.

The original George W. Blunt was a two-masted, 85-foot long, 122-ton schooner, 20 tons larger than any other boat in the Sandy Hook fleet. The cabin was finished with bird's eye maple, mirrors, and velvet brocade cushions. The stern was ornamented with a scroll and shield which displayed the national flags of America, England and France. According to American Lloyd's Register of American and Foreign Shipping, the George W. Blunt was built in New York, in 1856 for the New York Pilots. James Callahan was master of the boat.

As the original pilot-boat, the George W. Blunt, was in service with the N.Y. Pilots and rescued boats off the coast of New York. On October 10, 1860, New York Sandy Hook Pilot A. C. Malcom, of the pilot boat G. W. Blunt, No. 11, signed a statement along with other pilots, that they were satisfied with the representation of the New York Board of Commissioners of Pilots.

=== Civil War ===
On November 23, 1861, during the Civil War, the George W. Blunt was purchased by the United States Navy as a gunboat and dispatch boat in support of the Union Navy blockade of Confederate waterways. The schooner was renamed G. W. Blunt and commissioned 4 December 1861.

On April 19, 1862, the 60-ton Confederate schooner Wave under Captain Ryan, was captured by the pilot-boat George W. Blunt off the coast of South Carolina.

== Second George W. Blunt pilot boat ==
A replacement pilot boat, built in July 1861, was purchased from Boston builders Brown & Lovell to take the place of the original George W. Blunt, which was sold to the government during the Civil War. The 75-foot vessel (tonnage variously given as 120t and 52t, but types of measure unspecified) was purchased by Henderson & Callahan of New York for $8,000 was described as a fast sailer, and registered at New York to the New York Pilots with Official Number 10423.

In 1874, this George W. Blunt, rescued the bark Alfred at sea during a storm that brought the boat safely into New York port.

In February 1875, the pilot boat George W. Blunt sprang a leak off Gay Head and was run ashore at Jones Inlet, twenty-eight miles from Sandy Hook and was reported to have become a total loss. She had on board the following pilots: John Handran, Thomas Murphy, Robert Yates, Edward Kelly, James Heines, and Michael O'Shaughnessy. Her value was estimated at $10,000, which only $1,400 was covered by insurance.

== USS G. W. Blunt ==
USS G. W. Blunt was a Sandy Hook pilot boat acquired by the Union Navy during the American Civil War in 1861. She was used by the Union Navy as a gunboat as well as a dispatch boat in support of the Union Navy blockade of Confederate waterways. Towards the war's end, she was reconfigured as a rescue and salvage ship. Her new task was to remove many of the shipwrecks, hulks, and other in-water debris of war. The G. W. Blunt was decommissioned on 16 August 1865 at Port Royal and was sold there on 20 October 1865.

The G. W. Blunt was a wooden two-masted schooner built by Daniel Westervelt in New York and launched 6 September 1856. The schooner was acquired by the Navy Department in New York City on 23 November 1861 by George D. Morgan, who was the purchase agent for the U.S. government. The cost was $10,000. As a result of this purchase, the Sandy Hook pilots had a replacement boat built in July 1861, from Boston builders Brown & Lovell She was commissioned on 4 December 1861 and acting Master was Henry Sherwood who was in command.

Arriving at Port Royal, South Carolina, on 11 December 1861, G. W. Blunt served as a mail and dispatch boat for the South Atlantic Blockading Squadron between Charleston, South Carolina, Wassaw Sound, Georgia, and Fernandina, Florida. En route to Georgetown, South Carolina, on 19 April 1862 she captured the blockade-running schooner Wave with a cargo of cotton. For the following year, the G. W. Blunt was on a blockade duty off Charleston and assisted in capturing several more vessels. She departed Port Royal, South Carolina, for Philadelphia, Pennsylvania, on 7 May 1863 and was decommissioned for repairs on 13 May 1863. Recommissioned on 2 June 1863, the G. W. Blunt rejoined the blockading squadron off Charleston, patrolling the many small inlets and bays near the main harbor.

Cruising on Charleston station on 1864, the G. W. Blunt was sent to Port Royal on 7 August 1864 and on 25 August was fitted with diving equipment for salvage duty. She worked on many wrecks, including Constance on 13 November and the USS Housatonic, (sunk 17 February 1864 by Confederate submarine H. L. Hunley) from 15 to 19 November. She was sent to Savannah, Georgia, on 1 March 1865 to clear obstructions from the harbor, and returned to Charleston 1 April 1865.

== See also ==
- Pilot boat
- List of Northeastern U. S. Pilot Boats
