= N.B. Palmer (clipper) =

Clipper ship

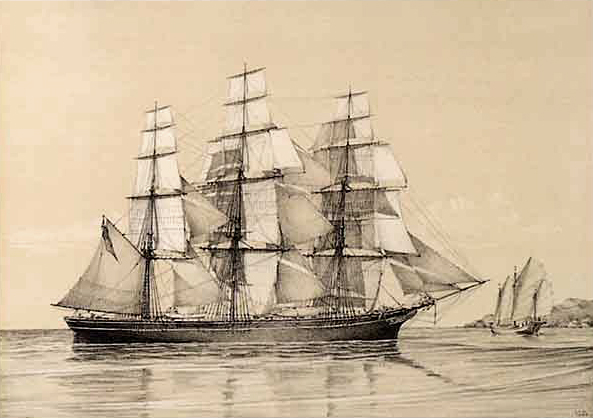
- Clipper ship N.B. Palmer

History

United States
- Owner: A.A. Low & Brother, New York
- Builder: Westervelt & MacKay
- Launched: 1851
- Fate: Sold to Norway

Norway
- Owner: Registered in Arendal, Norway
- Out of service: 1892
- Fate: Abandoned in the North Atlantic at 45°N, 43°W

General characteristics
- Class & type: Clipper
- Tonnage: 1399 tons old measurement, 1124 tons new measurement
- Length: 202 ft. 6 in.
- Beam: 38 ft. 6 in.
- Draught: 21 ft. 11 in.
- Notes: "Sailed from Shanghai to New York in the record time of 82 days (64 from Anjer)"

The N.B. Palmer was a clipper ship owned by A.A. Low & Brother which was active in the China trade.

In 1858–1859 the N.B. Palmer, with her 28-year-old Captain Hingham tied the record of 82 days for the Shanghai to New York run.

N.B. Palmer was named after explorer, sailing captain, and ship designer Nathaniel Palmer. Along with the Sweepstakes, she was perhaps the most famous clipper built in New York's Westervelt yard. In China N.B. Palmer was known as "the Yacht", and with her nettings in the tops, brass guns, gold stripe, and her lavish entertainment on the Fourth of July and Washington's Birthday, she well deserved the title. A full-rigged model of the N.B. Palmer was exhibited at The Crystal Palace, London, in 1851, and attracted much attention as a fine example of the American clipper ship.

== See also ==
- Nathaniel Palmer
- Jacob Aaron Westervelt
- A.A. Low
- Old China Trade
