= Nettle (pilot boat) =

New York Pilot boat

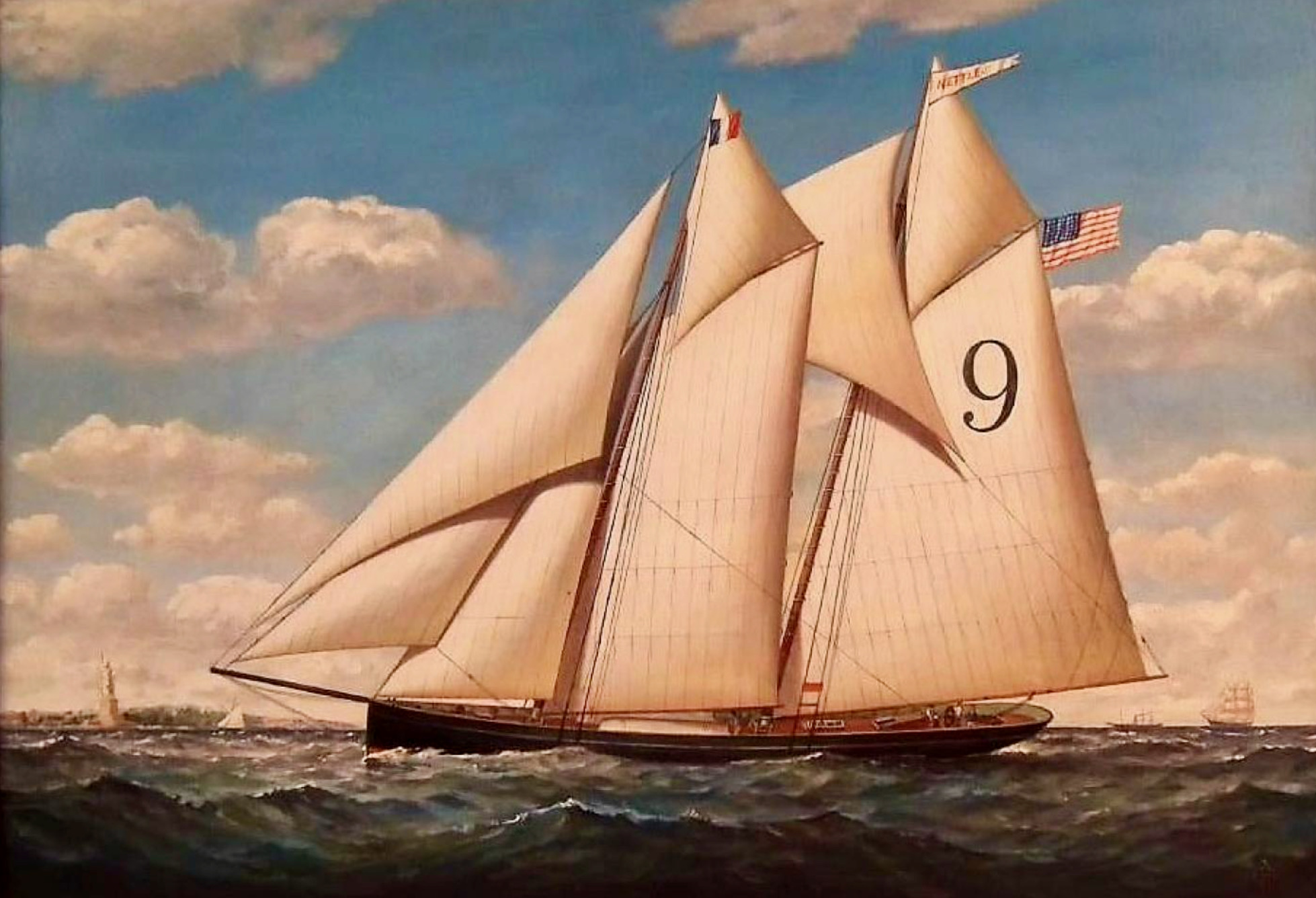
- Oil painting of the New York Pilot Boat Nettle, No. 9., by Antonio Jacobsen, ca. 1850–1921.

History

United States
- Name: Nettle
- Owner: New York Pilots, E. C. Mosser
- Operator: James Calahan (1844); Joseph Lockman (1868); F. Willis (1871 to 1879); Johnson (1873-1874)
- Launched: 1844
- Completed: July 19, 1844
- Out of service: February 28, 1876
- Homeport: New York
- Fate: Sunk

General characteristics
- Class & type: Schooner
- Displacement: 32 tons TM
- Draft: 9 ft 0 in (2.74 m)
- Propulsion: sails
- Sail plan: Schooner-rigged

The Nettle was a 19th-century Sandy Hook pilot boat built in 1844 by S. Hall of East Boston, Massachusetts for the New York Pilots. She helped transport maritime pilots between inbound or outbound ships coming into the New York Harbor. In 1868, she found the wreck of the bark Henry Trowbridge, and towed her to Sandy Hook. The Nettle, sank in 1876 in the Pensacola Bay. The sunken wreck was removed in 1878 to improve the Pensacola harbor.

== Construction and service ==
Pilot boat Nettle, No. 20, was built in 1844, by S. Hall of East Boston, Massachusetts. She was copper fastened and built with white oak and hackmetak. She had a 27-ton iron ballast. The Boston Merchant's Exchange put her up for sale in the summer of 1845. The ad said she was one year old and the price was $1,000.

On September 25, 1845, George W. Blunt bout the Nettle, as he signed a letter to the editor of the Washington Union, to insert a message in the paper, which said he was the true and only owner of the Nettle, of New York, built at Boston, Massachusetts in the year 1844, per enrollment in the port of Boston. On July 19, 1844, he became the owner of the Nettle, and that James Calahan was the master or commander.

By 1847, the Nettle No. 2, was helping to rescue the shipwrecks outside the New York harbor. On August 6, 1947, off Montauk, New York, she helped rescue the passengers from the sinking schooner Sarah Strong. The next day the Nettle helped in the transfer the passengers from the Brig Ann Maria and take them into port.

In 1856, the Nettle was reported as boat No. 20. On January 22, 1856, she was on a cruise and came across the brig Eurania off Sandy Hook with her Topgallant sail gone. The Nettle towed her inside of Sandy Hook.

In 1860, the Nettle was one of only twenty-one pilot boats in the New York and New Jersey fleet. The boat number "20" was painted as a large number on her mainsail, that identified the boat as belonging to the Sandy Hook Pilots.

On April 23, 1860, the pilot boat Nettle, No. 20, came across the wreck of the Bark Belle. The following report was recorded in the ship's Logbook: "Sunday 15th, at three P.M. fell in with the wreck of bark Belle of Boston, dismasted and waterlogged; attempted to tow her, but wind being light made no impression upon her; lay by her all night... At noon nothing of her was above water but the stern and rudder. She lays lame literally in the track of vessels bound to and from the eastward, being 70 miles from Sandy Hook in 20 fathoms of water"

On March 29, 1864, the pilot boat Nettle, came up to the Portland, Maine port and saw a vessel with two bright lights ten miles from Cape Elizabeth Lights. She then saw a fire at Saco, Maine, on the mainland.

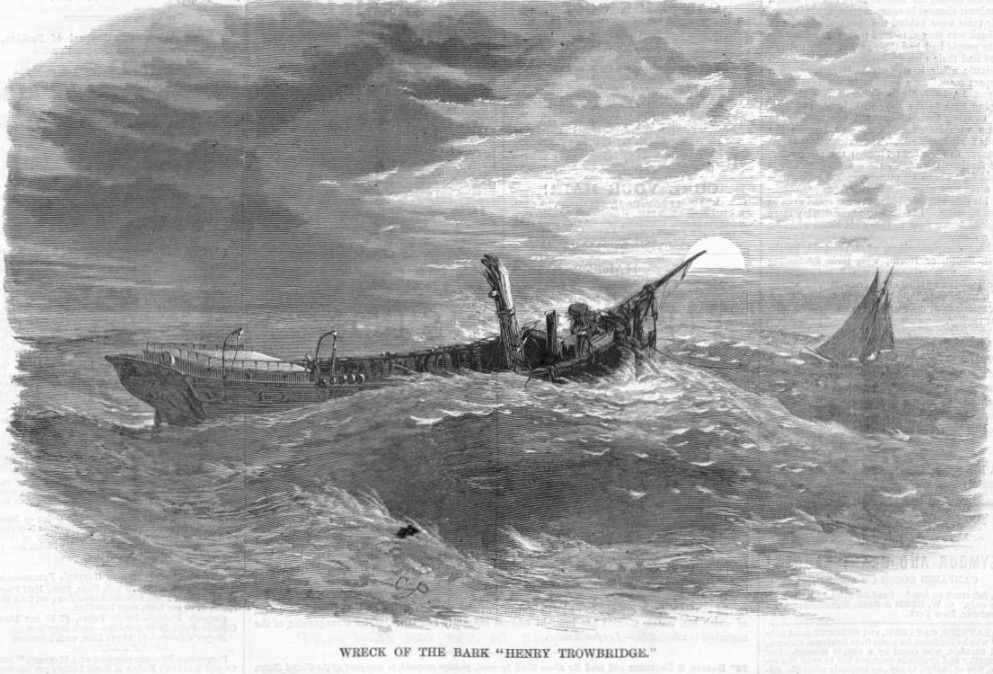
Wreck of the bark Henry Trowbridge, and the pilot boat Nettle.

On August 6, 1868, Captain Joseph Lockman of the pilot boat Nettle, found the wreck of the bark Henry Trowbridge, forty miles from Sandy Hook. Lockman of the Nettle, took her in tow to Sandy Hook. The hold of the vessel contained the bodies of three seamen found in the forecastle. The Nettle received $3,300 salvage for saving her. The Captain, wife, children and most of the crew abandoned the boat and escaped in a boat to Halifax.

The Nettle was not registered with the Record of American and Foreign Shipping, until 1870. From 1870 to 1879, she was registered as a Pilot Schooner, with E. C. Mosser as the owner and pilots F. Willis and Johnson as the Masters; built in 1845 at East Boston; belonging to the Port of New York. Her dimensions were 9 ft. in draft; and 31-tons burthen. In 1876, pilot boat Nettle, was still registered with the Port of New York. However, by 1877, she was registered with the Port of Pensacola.

== End of service ==
On February 28, 1876, the wreck of the pilot boat Nettle, was reported lying one mile from the outer bar buoy in 4 1/2 fathoms of water, with her bowsprit underwater; in the Pensacola Bay. In November 1878, there was a contract made with George W. Le Gallais, to remove the sunken wreck of the pilot boat Nettle, and other boats, by July 1, 1879, to improve the Pensacola harbor.

== See also ==
- Pilot boats
- List of Northeastern U. S. Pilot Boats
