= Abraham Leggett =

Sandy Hook Pilot boat

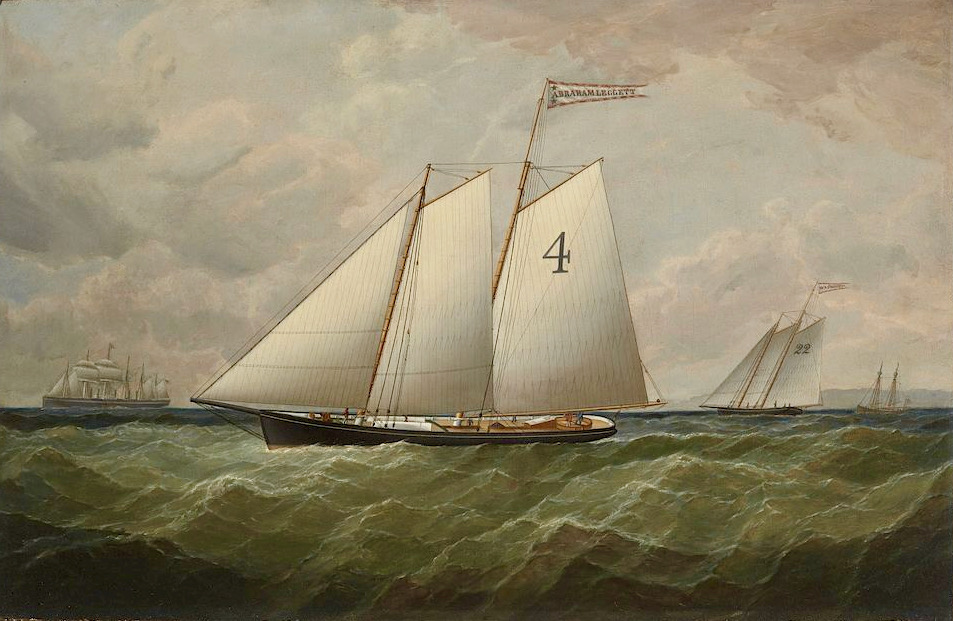
- Oil on canvas painting of pilot-boat Abraham Leggett, No. 4, by Elisha Taylor Baker

History

United States
- Name: Abraham Leggett
- Namesake: Abraham Leggett
- Owner: N. Y. Pilots
- Operator: Michael Murphy
- Builder: Westervelt & Co. shipyard
- Launched: c. 1870
- Out of service: 3 February 1879
- Fate: Sank

General characteristics
- Class & type: Schooner
- Tonnage: 55 Thames Measurement
- Length: 82 ft 0 in (24.99 m)
- Beam: 20 ft 8 in (6.30 m)
- Draft: 9 ft 7 in (2.92 m)
- Depth: 8 ft 4 in (2.54 m)
- Propulsion: Sail

The Abraham Leggett was a 19th-century New York pilot boat built by Daniel Westervelt at the Westervelt & Co. shipyard. She helped transport New York City maritime pilots between inbound or outbound ships coming into the New York Harbor. In 1866, Pilot Michael Murphy was on the Abraham Leggett when the bark Emilie ran into the pilot boat. In 1879, the Abraham Leggett was hit and sank by the steamship Naples from Liverpool. She was replaced by the pilot boat Alexander M. Lawrence.

== Construction and service ==
New York pilot boat Abraham Leggett, No. 4, was built c. 1870 by Daniel Westervelt at the Westervelt & Co. shipyard at the East River in New York City.

The Abraham Leggett was registered as a pilot schooner with the Record of American and Foreign Shipping from 1876 to 1879. Her ship master was Michael Murphy; her owners were the N. Y. Pilots; built in 1870 at New York; and her hailing port was the Port of New York. Her dimensions were 82 ft. length on deck; 20.8 ft. breadth of beam; 8.4 ft. depth of hold; and 55-tons burthen.

There are reports of the New York pilot boat Abraham Leggett, No. 4, and her ship logs as early as March 1868 where she arrived in New York City after sailing on a cruise from February 23 to March 3 in bad weather. She had placed pilots on board the brigs Emma Ives; George; from West Indies bound to New Haven; the steamship Gulf City; and the Mary Louisa from Charleston, bound to Boston.

On September 4, 1866, a collision took place off Staten Island, at the Quarantine Station, between the schooner pilot boat Abraham Leggett and the Bremen bark Emilie. The bark had come in from sea and was in tow by a tugboat. She passed too close to the pilot boat and ran into her. The case went to the US District Court (Michael Murphy vs. The Bark Emilie), where the judge concluded that the collision was caused by the fault of the Emilie.

On January 24, 1876, the Abram Leggett, No. 4, was between Georgia and Nantucket shoals, when she was caught up in a storm, which threw her on her side. When the boat up righted, she was able to stay afloat until the storm subsided.

== End of service ==
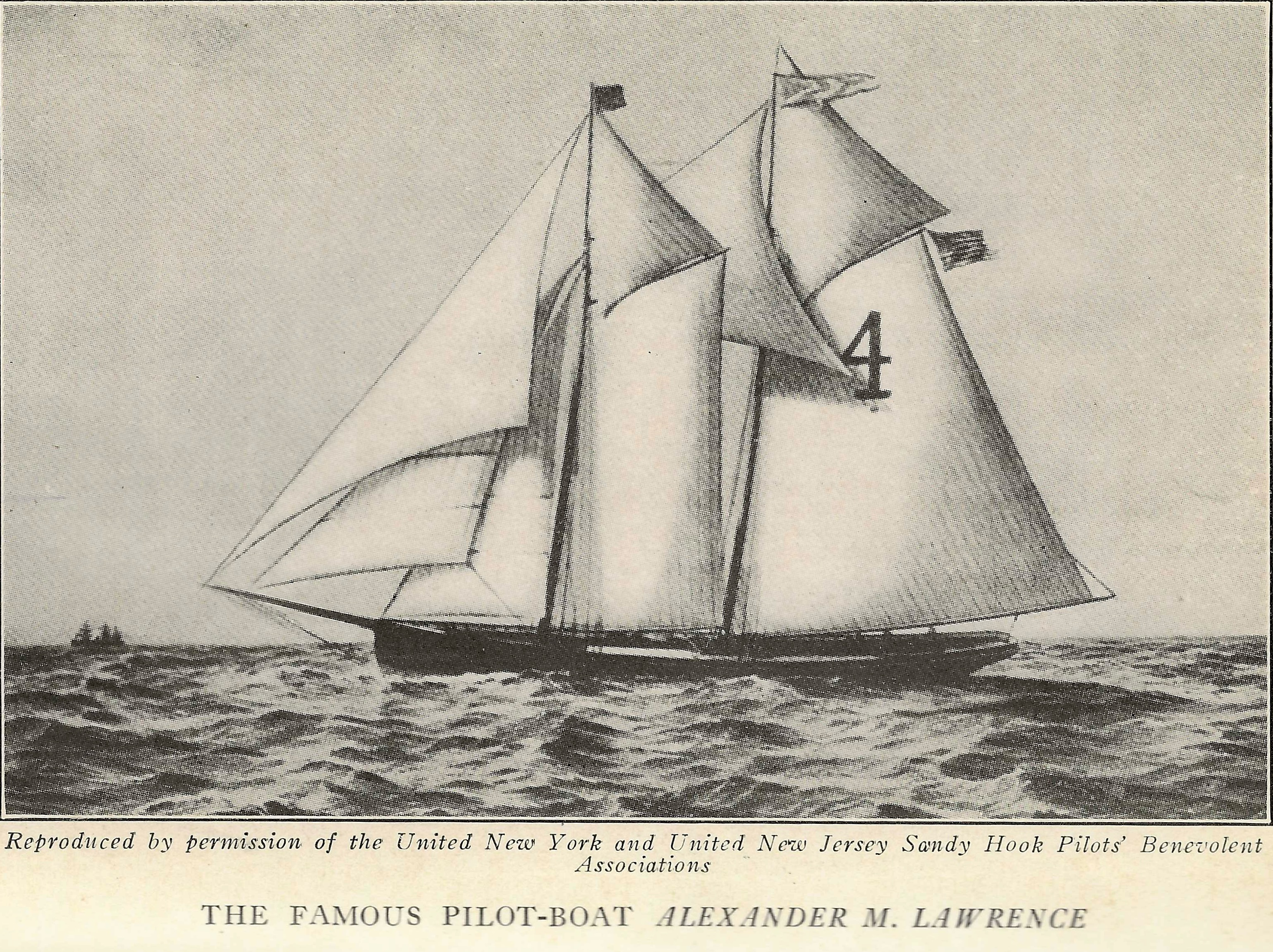
Alexander M. Lawrence pilot boat

On 26 January 1879, the Abraham Leggett, No. 4, was hit by the steamship Naples from Liverpool when the pilot-boat came along the side of the steamer attempting to board her. The damage was so bad that the pilots abandoned the pilot boat and came on board the steamer. Captain Kennedy of the steamer said that he did not take responsibility for the loss of the boat because he was in no need of a pilot and the weather was too bad to board.

In 1879, the pilot boat Alexander M. Lawrence, No. 4, was built to take the place of the Abraham Leggett, No. 4. The Lawrence was launched on May 21, 1879.

== See also ==
- List of Northeastern U.S. pilot boats
