= Christian Bergh =

American shipwright (1763–1843)

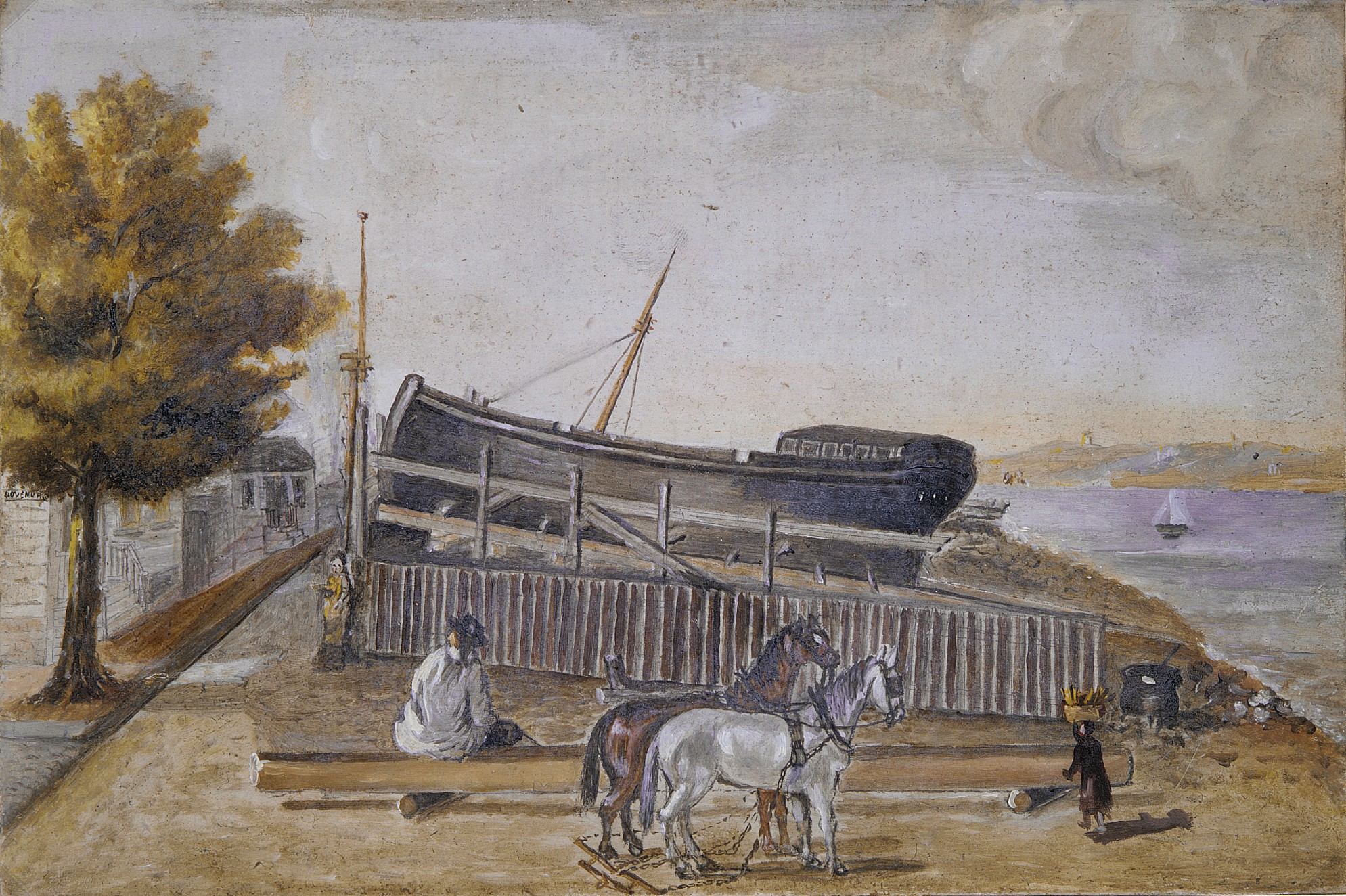
- Christian Bergh's shipyard at Corlears Hook along the East River in 1807.
- Born: April 30, 1763; Rhinebeck, Dutchess County, New York, US
- Died: June 24, 1843 (aged 80); New York City, US
- Occupation: Shipbuilder
- Spouse: Elizabeth Ivers
- Children: 3

Christian Bergh (April 30, 1763 – June 24, 1843) was an American shipwright based in New York. He was known for not allowing drinking and was the first shipbuilder to employ African Americans at his shipyard. He contributed to the advances in the design and speed of 19th century sailing vessels.

== Early life ==
Christian Bergh was born on April 30, 1763, in Rhinebeck, Dutchess County, New York. He married Elizabeth Ivers in 1800 in Stonington, New London, Connecticut. They had three children, Edwin (1802-1876), Jane (1812-1869), and Henry (1813-1888). His ancestors came to America from Germany.

== Career ==
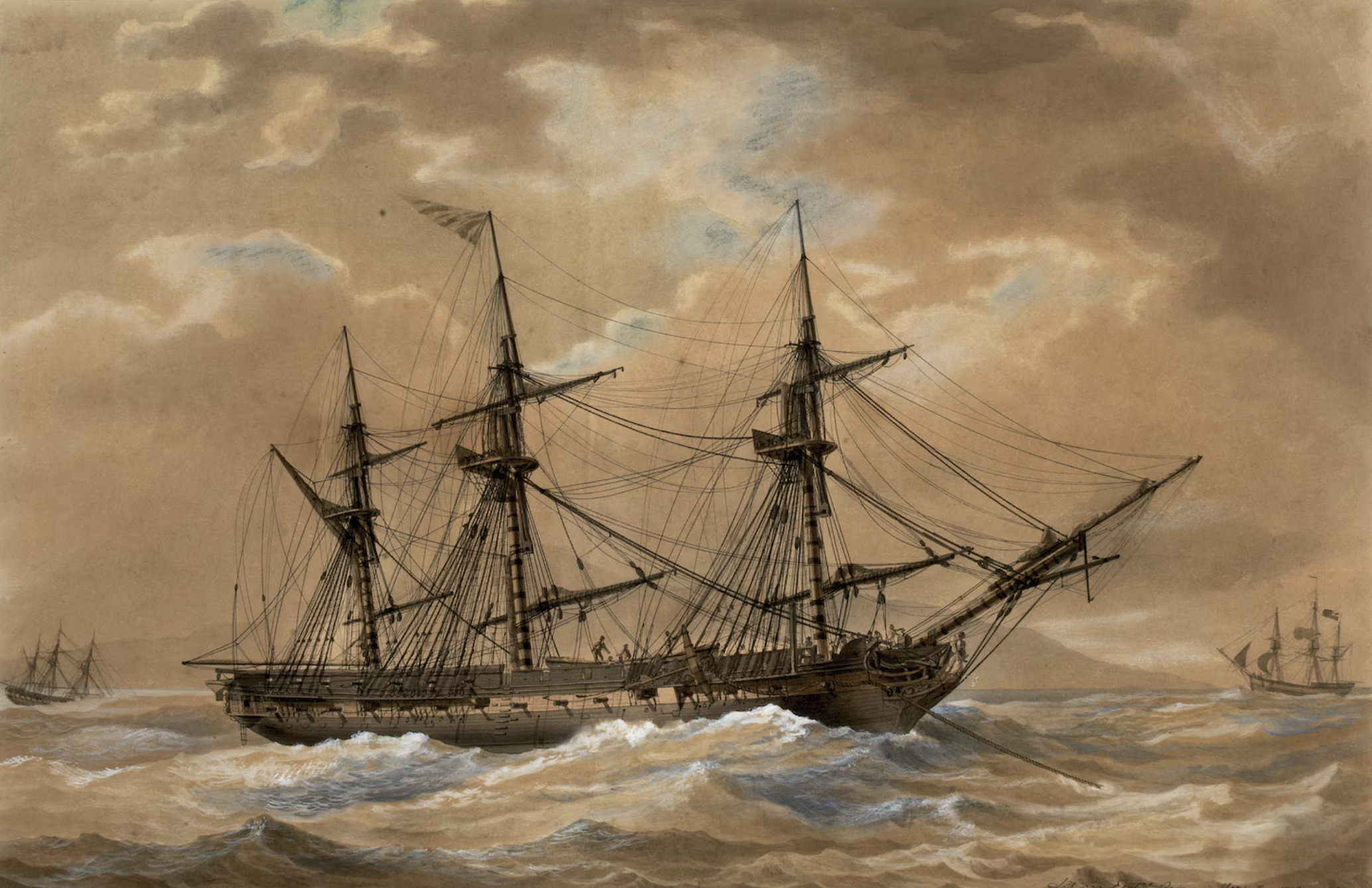
The USS President at anchor in heavy swell.

Bergh began shipbuilding in 1798 before the War of 1812. He was appointed by the US government, with naval constructor William Doughty, to construct the 44-gun frigate President, which was completed in April 1800 at the Brooklyn Navy Yard.

Bergh established a shipyard at Corlears Hook along the East River in the early 1800s. It was called Christian Bergh & Co. He built the following ships: North America (1804), Gypsey (1805), Galloway (1807), Canton (1809), Don Quixotte (1823), Ed Quesnel (1824), Paris (1824), and El Bonaffee (1824).

In July 1808, he and Henry Eckford were sent to Lake Ontario to build ships for the United States Navy. They built the 14-gun US Navy brig USS Oneida at Oswego, New York, on Lake Ontario.

When he returned to New York, he continued with his shipyard at the foot of Scammel Street in the East River. There he built the frigate Hellas and the Antarctic.

Jacob Aaron Westervelt was an apprentice for Christian Bergh in 1817 for five years. In 1822, Westervelt formed a partnership with Robert Carnley and Bergh under the name of C. Bergh & Co. Some of the ships built by Bergh and Westervelt were the Hope (1825), Henry IV (1826), Charlemagne (1828), Albany (1831), Philadelphia (1832), Utica (1833), Distress (1834), Westminster (1835), and Toronto (1835).

Bergh's son, Henry Bergh joined his father in 1835 at the C. Bergh & Co., shipbuilding business. He was later the founder of the American Society for the Prevention of Cruelty to Animals (ASPCA) in April, 1866.

Christian Bergh retired in 1837 having contributed to the advances in the design and speed of ships and a wealthy man. In 1837, Henry and his brother Edwin reorganized the business as Bergh & Co. Edwin continued the business until his father's death in 1843, when the shipyard was closed.

== Death ==
Christian Bergh died on June 24, 1843, at age 81, in New York City. He is buried at the St. Mark's Church in-the-Bowery Churchyard, in New York City. Philip Hone, a New York Mayor and celebrated diarist, wrote the following upon his death:

Died this day Christian Bergh, age 81 years, the oldest ship carpenter in the City, the father of the great system of Naval Architecture, which has rendered the City of New York famous throughout the world. Christian Bergh, was the first to raise the Character of Yankee packet ships to a height which as yet has been unapproached by any foreign nation.

== Legacy ==
The pilot-boat Christian Bergh, was most likely named in honor of Bergh as it was built by Westervelt in 1851.
