= Jacob Aaron Westervelt =

American politician & shipbuilder (1800–1879)

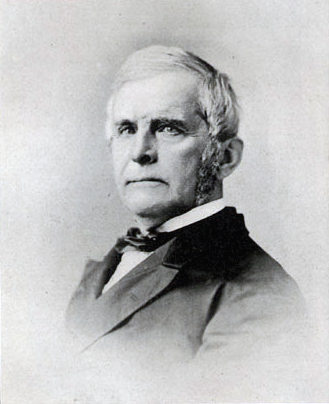
- Westervelt in the 1870s

73rd Mayor of New York City
- In office 1853–1855
- Preceded by: Ambrose Kingsland
- Succeeded by: Fernando Wood

Personal details
- Born: January 20, 1800 Tenafly, New Jersey, United States
- Died: February 21, 1879 (aged 79) New York, New York, United States
- Party: Democratic
- Spouse: Eliza M. Thompson
- Profession: Shipbuilder, dock commissioner
- The Order of Isabella the Catholic was conferred upon him by the Queen of Spain in 1859.; Some ships were named after Jacob A. Westervelt. One of them was built by the Todd Houston Shipbuilding Corporation, Houston TX (hull no. 154).

Jacob Aaron Westervelt (January 20, 1800 – February 21, 1879) was a renowned and prolific shipbuilder who constructed 247 vessels of all descriptions during his career of over 50 years. From 1853 until 1855 he was Mayor of New York City.

Together with his partners (Westervelt & MacKay and Westervelt & Sons) he designed some of the fastest and most successful sailing packets, clippers and steamships ever built, among these the screw sloop USS Brooklyn and the clipper Sweepstakes, as well as many vessels for foreign governments and Royal Houses. Westervelt was awarded the Order of Isabella the Catholic by the Queen of Spain for the preparation of models and plans for three Spanish frigates. For many years he was the president of the Society of Mechanics and Tradesmen, a member of the Chamber of Commerce, the Marine Society, the Port Society and the St. Nicholas Society. He was also President of the Board of Dock Commissioners for several years. After Westervelt's death, the flags at City Hall were lowered to half-mast.

== Early life (1800–1817) ==
Westervelt was the eldest son of Ari and Vrowti Westervelt. Ari Westervelt was a builder by occupation. He built several houses in Franklin Street, New York, and constructed the South Church in Schraalenburgh in today's borough of Bergenfield, New Jersey . Westervelt was born in Tenafly, on January 20, 1800, and was baptized at Schraalenburgh on February 16, being the first child to receive that sacrament after the completion of the new church. The Westervelts then resided at the old family homestead on Tenafly Road midway between Englewood and Tenafly. When Ari Westervelt was working on improving the riverfront, he moved, together with his infant son, to New York in 1804, to be nearer his work. It was to his father that Jacob Aaron owed his good education. His father died when Westervelt was only 14.

The sources differ as to Westervelt's further education and early career. He received additional education under the tutelage of James P. Forrester, then headmaster of the school connected with the Collegiate (Dutch) Church in New York, and was afforded greater educational opportunities under Barron & Brown, in a special course on surveying and navigation. Afterwards he went to sea, serving on ships for more than two years. He left the sea in 1817 and became an apprentice under Christian Bergh, a prosperous shipbuilder on the East River. A differing source reports that he went to sea directly after his father's death, while another states that he was already apprenticed to Christian Bergh in 1814.

== Christian Bergh's shipyard (1817–1836) ==
Westervelt learned the "art, trade and mystery" of his profession in a most independent way—as a teenage sailor and as an apprentice to Christian Bergh, for whom he worked at the very latest from the year 1817. Such was his talent that he was in Bergh's absolute confidence. Before even graduating from his apprenticeship, Westervelt accepted an offer to start business in Charleston, where he undertook the construction of two schooners, with the help of African American slaves from planters in and around Charleston (with his employer's consent). He was so successful during those few months that he continued in business there, but he found the environment too confining for his ambitions and in 1822 he returned to New York, where he formed a partnership with Robert Carnley and his old master under the name of C. Bergh & Co. Some of the ships built by Bergh and Westervelt were Hope (1825), Henry IV (1826), Charlemagne (1828), Albany (1831), Philadelphia (1832), Utica (1833), Westminster (1835), and Toronto (1835). Christian Bergh retired a wealthy man in 1837, and was succeeded by his sons Henry and Edwin Bergh, who continued the business until just after their father's death in 1843.

== Westervelt & Co. shipyard (1836–1864) ==
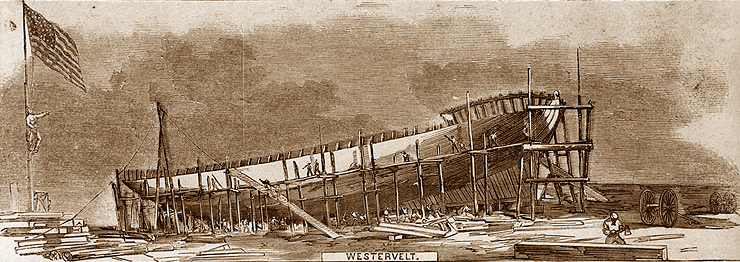
Engraving of the USS Ottawa under construction at the Westervelt shipyard in 1861

In 1836 Westervelt built at least two ships under his own name, the Baltimore and Mediator, in partnership with the 22-year-old ship chandler Marshall Owen Roberts as Westervelt & Roberts. Soon after Christian Bergh's retirement, Westervelt and Robert Carnley made an extensive tour of Europe, visiting the principal shipbuilding points, where Westervelt gathered information that he subsequently put to good use. Westervelt found an inactive life disagreeable and, after a year of travel, returned to the dry docks in 1838 and resumed shipbuilding.

There are differing reports as to the start of this new chapter of Westervelt's life. On one side it is stated that Westervelt bought out his former partners Carnley and the Bergh brothers and took control of the Bergh shipyard, at the foot of Gouverneur Street and extending to Water Street and up to Scammel. Other sources state that Westervelt and William MacKay (not to be confused with Canadian shipbuilder Donald McKay) established one of a few new yards at Corlear's Hook (the block bounded by Third, Goerck and Houston Streets) in 1841 and moved to Lewis and Seventh Street in 1844. Westervelt may also have designed and built ships in connection with Edward Mills.

The shipyard Westervelt & MacKay, later Westervelt & Sons (which Westervelt formed with his sons Aaron J. and Daniel), became prominent and prospered. Together with MacKay and his sons he built 50 steamships, 93 traditional sailing vessels and clippers, 5 barques, 14 schooners, one sloop, two lightships, and 11 pilot boats—a total of 181 vessels of 150,624 tons.

Some of his noteworthy pilot boats are:

- Mary and Catherine (1848)
- Christian Bergh (1851)
- Enchantress (1851)
- George W. Blunt (1856)
- Edwin Forrest (1855)
- Abraham Leggett (1870)

Westervelt built more vessels of medium tonnage than any builder of his time.

Some of his noteworthy sailing packets are:

- The Constellation (1849), built for the Robert Kermit Red Star Line—1,534 tons; 201 feet 10 inches x 41 feet x 28 feet (length x beam x depth of hold); 3 decks; draft 23 feet. This was the largest sailing vessel in the New York–Liverpool packet service at that time. The Constellation carried between 800 and 900 steerage passengers per passage on the lower deck (the 912 steerage passengers she discharged on 29 May 1851 was a record at the time).
- The West Point and the Waterloo were among the fastest on the North Atlantic route. (Under the pressure of competition, packet schedules were tightened and sailings reorganized due to disasters, new launchings, etc. In 1844–1848, several ships made three-month round trips instead of the traditional four months, calculated from one Liverpool departure to the following one.)
- The Margaret Evans, a packet sailing between New York and London on a regular schedule. She was built in 1846 in New York by Westervelt & MacKay and owned by E. E. Morgan. The ship is renowned because of the sea shanty "Clear the track", also called "Clear the track, let the bullgine run" or simply "Margaret Evans".

=== Clipper ships ===
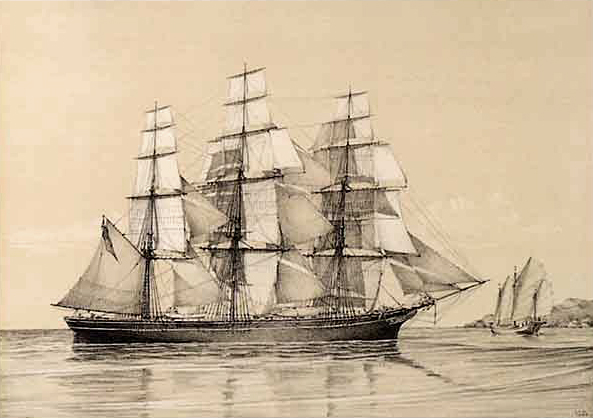
Clipper ship N.B. Palmer, built by Westervelt & MacKey in 1851

Westervelt also built clippers, for example Contest (1852), Hornet (1851), N.B. Palmer (1851), Kathay (1853), and Sweepstakes. Clipper bows were distinctively narrow and heavily raked forward, allowing them to rapidly clip through the waves. The first archetypal clipper, with sharply raked stem, counter stern and square rig, was Ann McKim, built in Baltimore in 1833 by Kennard & Williamson. For some historians, the Rainbow was the first true "Yankee clipper". She was built in 1845 to a new design by the American naval architect John Willis Griffiths who is said to have based his design on the owner's previous ship Ann McKim. This type of vessel had been in demand for the China trade, but they were rather small. From the experience gained in the service of these first clippers, the builder soon found the changes that were necessary in the design for the building of larger and faster ships demanded in 1850 for the California, China and Australia clipper routes.

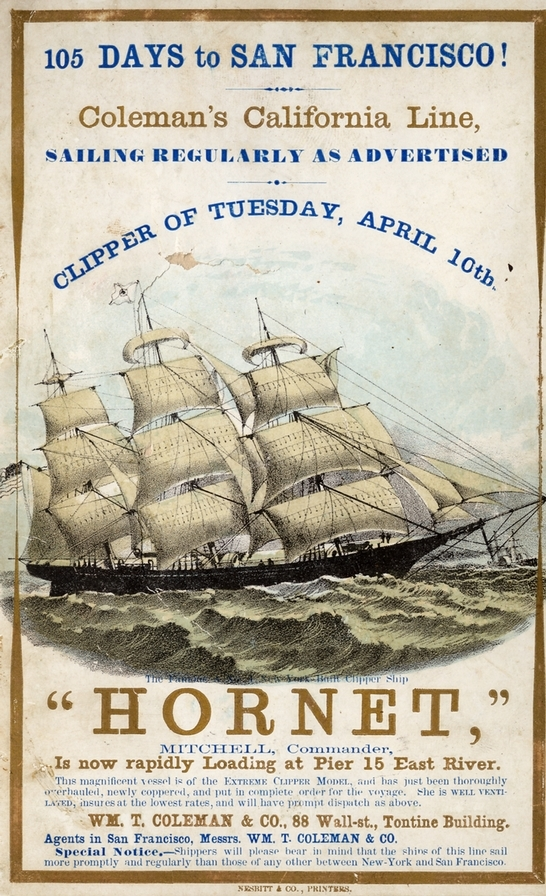
Hornet clipper ship card

==== Westervelt's clippers ====
The greatest New York clippers took shape in the yards of Westervelt and his friend William H. Webb. The N.B. Palmer was perhaps the most famous clipper built in the Westervelt yard, besides the Sweepstakes. In China she was known as "the Yacht", and with her nettings in the tops, brass guns, gold stripe, and her lavish entertainment on the Fourth of July and Washington's Birthday, she well deserved the title. A full-rigged model of the N.B. Palmer was exhibited at The Crystal Palace, London, in 1851, and attracted much attention as a fine example of the American clipper ship. In 1858–1859 the N.B. Palmer with her 28-year-old Captain Hingham had tied the record of 82 days for the Shanghai to New York run. The Sweepstakes, though black-hulled like other clippers, bore a stripe of gold, found on only a few others like the N.B. Palmer, and was praised for her sleek lines and speed. Sweepstakes (which was the last clipper to be built by the Westervelt shipyard) gained celebrity for her record-breaking seventy-four-day run from New York to Bombay in 1857, and for making the trip between New York City and San Francisco in only 106 days.

==== The end of the clipper ship era ====
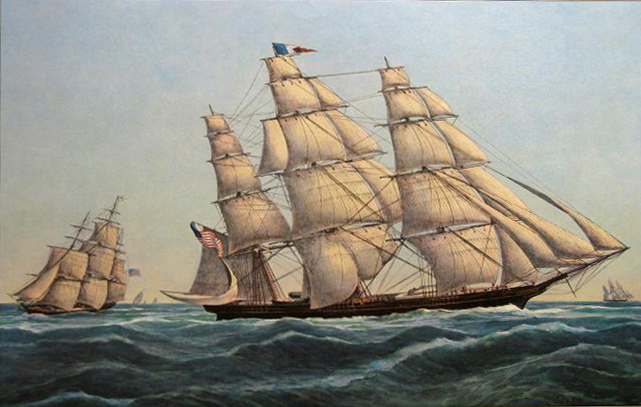
Clipper ship Sweepstakes, built by Westervelt & Sons in 1853

The economic boom spurred on by the California Gold Rush that had brought on the era of the clipper ships had turned to bust. All the secrets of building lofty clippers had been discovered and there were too many of them in existence. The dropping freight rates now gave no incentive to build any more. The San Francisco market was so saturated that many a disgusted ship captain dumped unwanted cargo overboard in the bay before sailing on to other ports. The diary of Robert Underhill, which recorded his 1856 travels on the Sweepstakes, revealed that Westervelt was also traveling on this voyage to San Francisco and the Orient. Underhill's entries made clear that Westervelt recognized the economic situation facing the port of New York and was seeking other possible venues for the family business.

By 1859 most of the extreme clippers had been dismasted more than once after half a decade or more of relentless hard driving. All were in a leaky condition, and most of their owners were by then in dire financial straits and could not afford expensive repairs to clippers that could not find a paying cargo to justify such expenses. Their masts were cut down, their yards shortened and their sails reduced as they were refitted and re-rigged with the new Howes rig to make them easier to handle by smaller crews. Other less fortunate clippers were discarded outright and sold for a pittance.

=== Steamboats and steamships ===
Some historians take the view that Westervelt built the first true American steamship that crossed the Atlantic to Europe. The Marquis Claude de Jouffroy d'Abbans from France invented and constructed the first steamboat, the so-called Palmipède, in 1774, and a second one, the steamboat Pyroscaphe, in 1783. Robert Fulton built the first commercially successful steam paddleship in the US, the North River Steamboat (also known as Clermont) in 1807, using a Boulton and Watt engine.

The Savannah is usually said to be the first steamship to cross the Atlantic (in 1819). She was originally planned as a sailing ship but was changed into a steamer. Because she did not make the entire passage under steam, some dispute the Savannah's claim as the pioneering ocean steamer of the Atlantic. The British steamer City of Kingston and the SS Royal William, a Quebec-built craft, have been suggested as the first true steamers to make the crossing.

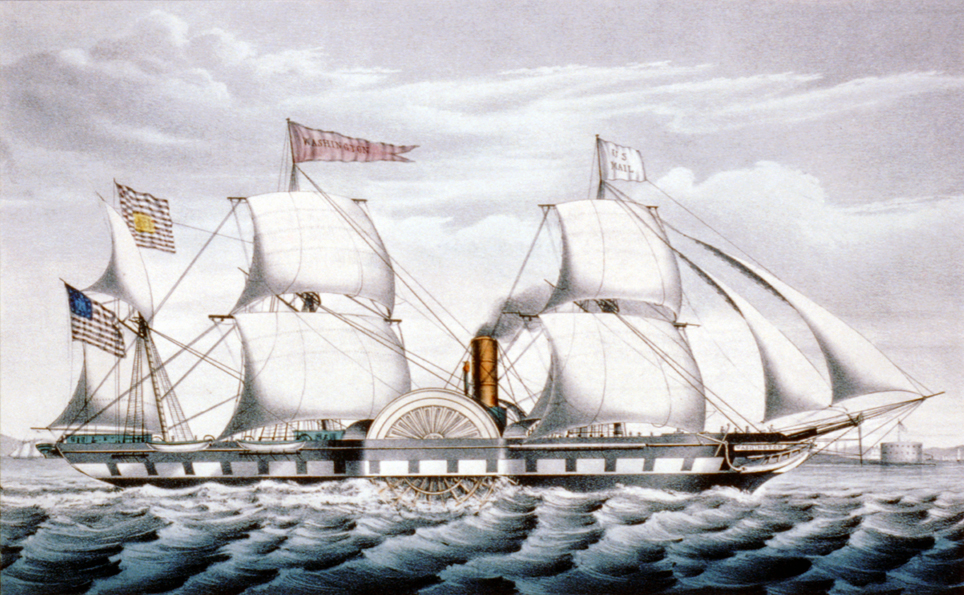
The SS Washington (1847)

Three side-wheel steamers were also built in New York: the Lion and the Eagle (subsequently Regent and Congress), built in 1841 by Jacob Bell for the Spanish navy, and at about the same time the Kamschatka built by William H. Brown for the Russian navy. After the Savannah, there was no steamship owned or run by an American company that navigated the Atlantic Ocean to a port in Europe until 1847.

In 1846 began inquiries regarding the building of steamships for regularly scheduled transatlantic service. Edward Mills, a novice in the shipping business, led a syndicate that received the contract for mail delivery to Le Havre and Bremen for five years. With his associates C. H. Sand, Mortimer Livingston and John L. Stephens, he founded the Ocean Steam Navigation Company in May 1846. The company was unable to attract sufficient capital to carry out its original business plan to build four ships and instead ordered two ships from Westervelt & MacKay, Washington and Hermann (1848). The Westervelt shipyard built the hull, and the engines were made by Stillman, Allen & Co. This was one of the less successful chapters in the history of the Westervelt shipyard. Both paddle steamers were said to be slow and had insufficient cargo space, and the government soon revoked the Le Havre portion of the mail contract because of the line's poor performance.

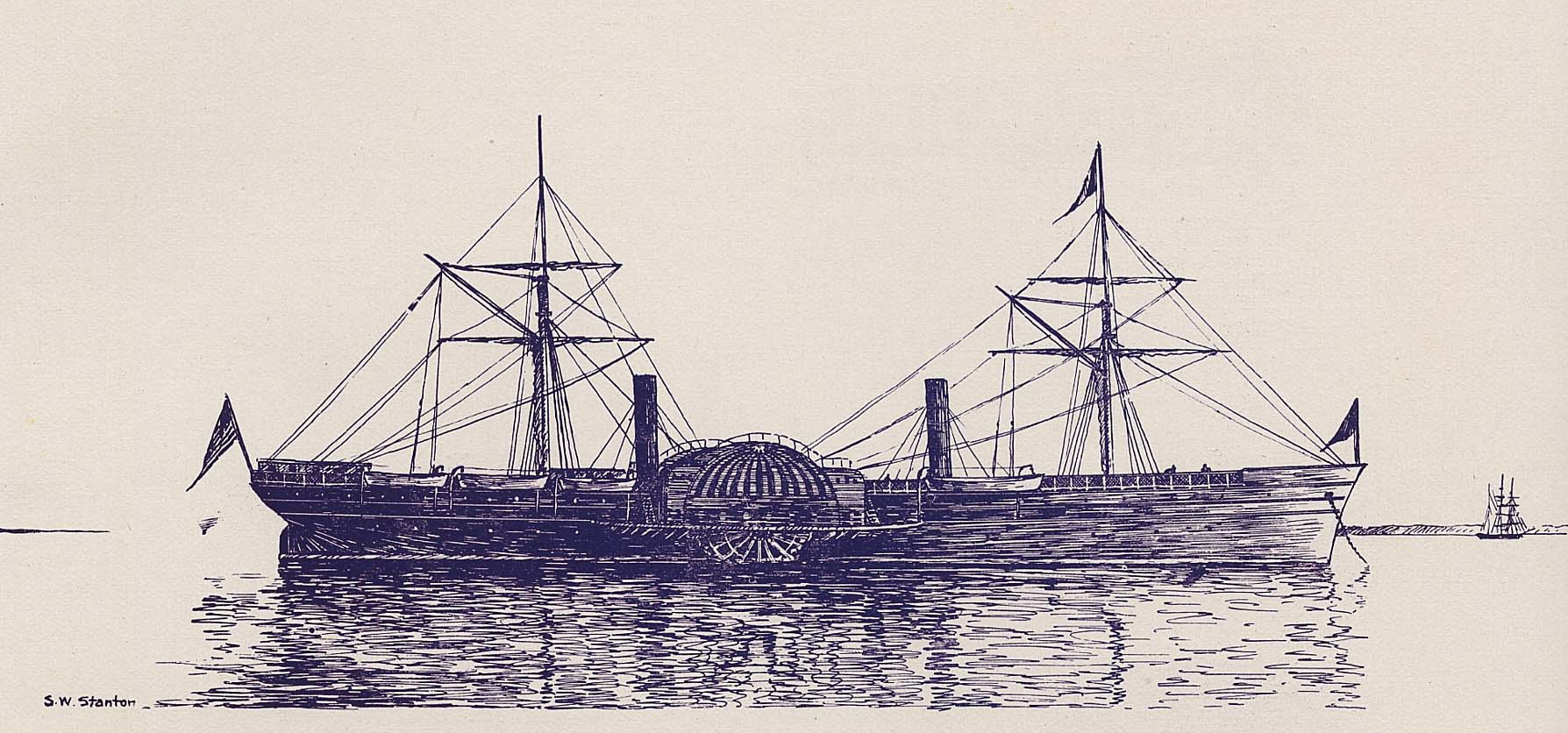
Arago (1855)

Westervelt and his associates later built very successful steamships. Through 1850 they built 8 of the 38 steamships constructed in New York until that year, including the Franklin and Havre (the first steam vessels for the Havre Line), followed by Arago and Rhode Island (for the government) and Eagle and Morro Castle (for Spofford, Tileston & Company). Westervelt & Sons also built Foong Shuey, afterwards named Plymouth Rock, of 287 feet in length, with an engine from the Lake Erie steamer Plymouth Rock. This vessel made the voyage from New York to Singapore in 51 days. (The all-time record for a sailing vessel on that route is 78 days.) The SS Winfield Scott built in 1850 by Westervelt & MacKay, wrecked on Middle Anacapa Island in 1853, and has been the object of numerous salvage operations since; she currently rests underwater as part of the Channel Islands National Park and Marine Sanctuary. The wreck site of the Winfield Scott is listed on the National Register of Historic Places.

=== Warships and ships for governments ===
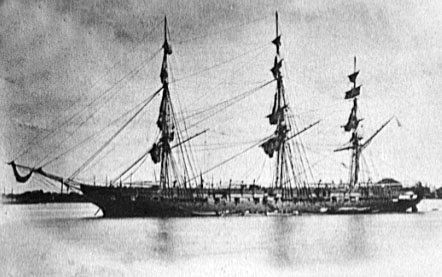
The screw sloop USS Brooklyn

By 1855, the gold rush was over and Westervelt, like other shipbuilders, began looking for new markets to keep his yard busy, as the shipping lines that had carried almost 2.7 million emigrants across the Atlantic by sailing vessels between 1846 and 1855, were ordering fewer ships than before. The declining trend continued because of the outbreak of the Civil War in 1861. Between 1855 and the end of the war in 1865, only 1.4 million emigrants were conveyed from Europe to the United States.

On March 3, 1857, the U.S. Congress authorized five screw sloops of war, one of them the USS Brooklyn (the first ship so named by the U.S. Navy). It was laid down later that year by Westervelt and his sons, launched in 1858, and commissioned on January 26, 1859, with Captain (later Admiral) David G. Farragut in command. USS Brooklyn was active in Caribbean operations until the start of the American Civil War. In 1861 she was an active participant in the Union blockade of the Confederate States of America. She received orders for many different missions: she was one of the ships that attacked the Forts St. Philip and Jackson, and under the command of Captain James Alden, Jr. she was part of the fleet that helped to blockade Mobile Bay. During the battle of Mobile Bay, which lasted a little more than three hours, 54 of Brooklyn's crew were killed and 43 wounded while firing 183 projectiles. After spending the next few weeks helping reduce the Confederate land works guarding the entrance, Brooklyn departed Mobile Bay on September 6, 1864, and headed for Hampton Roads for service in the North Atlantic Blockading Squadron. Soon thereafter, Brooklyn was in the task force that arrived off Fort Fisher on January 13, 1865, and her guns supported the attack until the fort surrendered on January 15. Since this victory completed the last major task of the Union Navy during the Civil War, Brooklyn sailed north and was decommissioned at the New York Navy Yard on January 31, 1865. Admiral Farragut declared Brooklyn to have been the most efficient man-of-war in the American navy.

Besides the Brooklyn, also built at the Westervelt shipyard were the gunboats USS Ottawa, USS Otsego and the revenue cutter USRC Kankakee, all of which performed efficient blockading services during the war. Westervelt also built many vessels for foreign governments, among these the frigate Hope in 1825 for the Greek government, Guadalquiver for Spain, and Eusiyama for Japan. Westervelt was awarded the Order of Isabella the Catholic by the Queen of Spain for the preparation of models and plans for three Spanish frigates.

=== Postwar slump and closure (1861–1868) ===
The most successful year for Westervelts's yard was 1858 when 12 ships were built (aggregating 14,081 tons). At the outbreak of the Civil War, Westervelt was one of the richest shipowners in the country. He was a supporter of the Union cause. President Abraham Lincoln esteemed his judgment highly, and entrusted him with the purchase of many of the river craft which were altered to suit the demands of blockading and transport service. Westervelt accepted nothing for such service, but contented himself with the profits accruing from his shipyard. It was during this period that his fortune shrank very much faster than it had been accumulated. Steamer after steamer was wrecked, burned or captured by Confederate cruisers, until at the close of the war he was almost bankrupt. During one year alone his losses from marine casualties amounted to $500,000.

After the end of the Civil War in 1865, the U.S. government auctioned off the hundreds of ships it had requisitioned during the war at firesale prices, depressing the market and leaving American shipyards with no work. The result was that most American shipyards, along with marine engine specialists, failed. Not only the Westervelt shipyard, but the whole shipbuilding industry in New York was badly affected by the slump, being practically wiped out in the ensuing years. As the demise of shipbuilding after the war afforded him little opportunity to recover from his losses, the firm was dissolved in 1868, with no large surplus of assets. By this time Westervelt had constructed 247 ships with his partners, more than any other American shipbuilder in his day.

== Dock Commissioner (1870–1879) ==
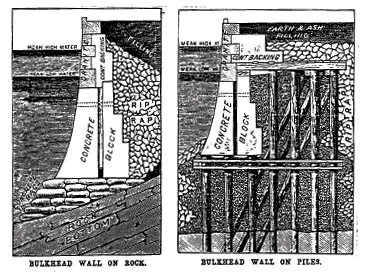
Variations of George S. Greene Jr's bulkhead wall plans for the docks and piers of New York City

When the Dock Department was created in 1870, Wilson G. Hunt prevailed upon Westervelt to accept the duties of Superintendent of the department. His management was characterized by prudence, sagacity and honesty. When William Frederick Havemeyer became mayor in 1873, Westervelt was appointed a Commissioner of Docks and at the same time elected President of the Board of Dock Commissioners (which position he also held at the time of his death), and as such made tremendous improvements in piers and docks. His chief engineer, whom he selected in July 1870, was General George B. McClellan, and his secretary General was Louis Fitzgerald. In 1875 George S. Greene Jr. became the new chief engineer.

As Dock Commissioner, Westervelt followed in the footsteps of his father by continuing to improve the riverfront.

In 1873 the draughtsmen and engineers in the office of the Engineer-in-Chief were engaged in the preparation of maps and drawings to show the grants of land under water, around, and adjoining the island of Manhattan which had been made by either the state or Municipal governments from 1696 till 1873. They were also engaged in the preparation of plans for a proposed exterior bulkhead wall which was planned to be built all around the city.

A new dock system was also proposed of which the main feature was a wide river street encircling the waterfront to afford ample accommodation for the movement of freight and its transportation by rail. The new river and sea wall was to be constructed of granite and a Beton concrete, composed of Portland cement and broken stone. From this wall projecting into the river were a series of piers constructed of wood, iron, and stone. The large concrete blocks used in the construction of the new river wall were manufactured at the yards of the Dock Commission in Gansevoort Street, Manhattan. Two to three blocks, of forty to fifty tons each, were made daily. Westervelt was closely involved in these improvements.

== Political career ==
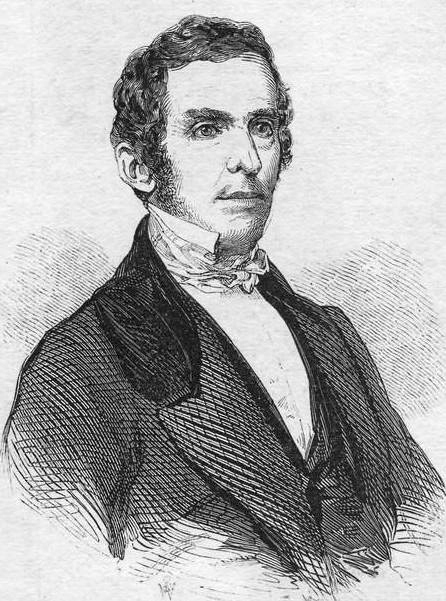
Westervelt in 1845

=== Start in politics (1840–1852) ===
Westervelt was politically an ardent but not very active Democrat. In 1840 he was elected to the Common Council, in which he served for two years as an Alderman from the thirteenth ward. Westervelt stepped back from active political involvement for a couple of years, but remained a shrewd observer of current affairs and recognized nuisances and the needs of the people of "his" town. He witnessed sharply increasing taxes between 1850 and 1852 and the establishment of a reform movement that began to decry excessive government spending. Grand jury revelations of widespread corruption on the common council heightened such concerns. Reformers mobilized and ran the Democratic incumbents out of office, electing in their place a combination of Whigs and reform Democrats committed to "economy" in government. In November 1852 Westervelt was nominated for mayor of the city by reformist representatives of the Democratic party. The mayoralty election was held at the same time as the presidential election, and the Democrats were successful in both.

=== Election as Mayor (1853–1855) and political goals ===
Westervelt was elected by a majority of 10,000, the largest ever received by a candidate up to that time (being nearly as much indebted to Whigs as to Democrats for his seat), against the most popular member of the Whig party, Alderman Morgan Morgans, carrying his own ward by a majority of nearly 1,000, and only a few votes behind the electoral ticket for President Franklin Pierce. The new mayor inherited the bad financial situation of the city, corrupt politicians, and an ailing police system. In his first message to the Community Council he declared the subjects he planned to deal with first, and that according to him, needed the attention of the council:

... The finances of our City, from their magnitude and importance, demand, and should secure your most earnest attention and careful supervision ... I find, from the annual statement of the Controller, submitted in December last, that the expenditures, during the past year, have exceeded the appropriations $742,157 dollars, which amount must be added to the sum to be raised by tax during the present year, and I learn from the same document that the total increase of expenditures for 1853 over those of 1852, amounted to $1,543,296.70 dollars ... Such an excess of expenditures appears to me to be in disregard, not only of the provisions of the charter, but of the authority of the Legislature, as power is granted by that body to levy and collect taxes on specific estimates for the various purposes required, and these estimates should, in my opinion, never be exceeded, except on occasions of unavoidable necessity. A very large amount is required to be raised for school purposes; but the object of the appropriation is so noble and philanthropic, and the benefits resulting from its judicious expenditure are so permanent in their character and so widely diffused, our constituents will doubtless yield an approval of the expenditure for such a purpose, though adding so materially to the amount of tax ... The Police Department is one of the most important of any connected with the City Government, and its present and future condition, may well demand our serious consideration. The object for which it was organized, was the more effectual security of persons and property ... This, however can only be attained, and the efficiency of the Department insured, by maintaining the most rigid disciple, and by inculcating implicit obedience to the rules and regulations adopted for the government of all connected with it ... In this connection I would earnestly commend to your consideration the necessity for lighting the wharves and piers with gas ... There has been no general revision of the ordinances since 1845, and when it is considered that many new ordinances are enacted in each year, the difficulty of referring to them, scattered as they are through so many volumes of proceedings, must me apparent to all, and this difficulty is much enhanced to those not familiar with our municipal affairs. Several of my predecessors have urgently recommended the compilation of the existing ordinances, and their publication in one volume ... I would earnestly renew that recommendation, trusting that the importance of the subject will commend itself to your early and serious attention. The proper cleaning of the streets is so intimately connected with the health, comfort and convenience of our citizens, too much attention cannot be given to it, and my own convictions are, that the community will not object to any reasonable expenditure when judiciously devoted to that purpose ...

=== Mayor Westervelt and the police ===
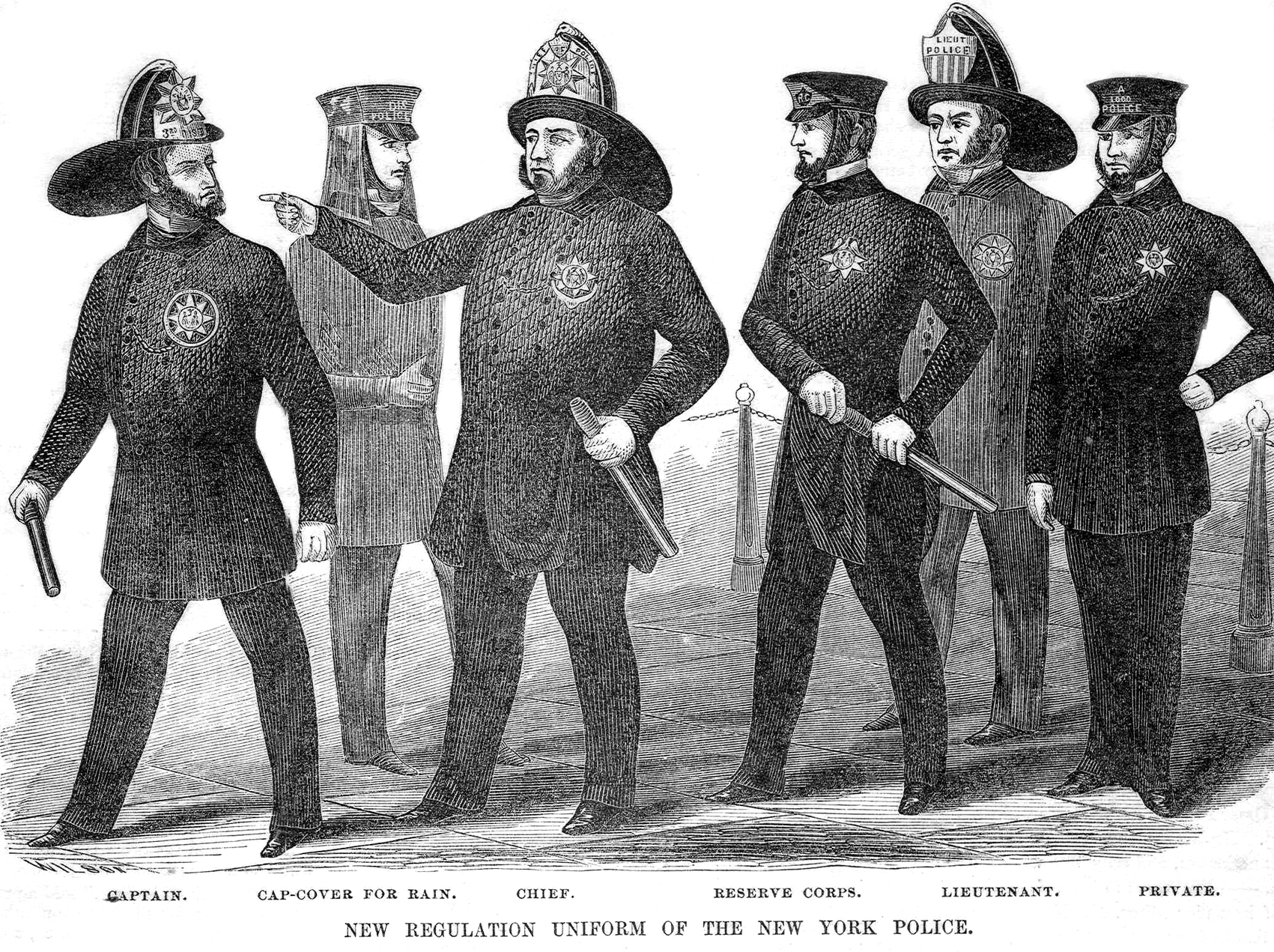
New regulation uniform of the New York Police. Illustration published in the newspaper Gleason's Pictorial Drawing Room, January 7, 1854.

Westervelt's term was marked by many reforms of the city's police. One of the most controversial was his attempt to enforce a police uniform.

In 1844, New York City's population of 320,000 was served by an archaic police force, consisting of one night watch, one hundred city marshals, thirty-one constables, and fifty-one municipal police officers. On 7 May 1844, the state legislature approved a proposal that authorized creation of a city police force, along with abolition of the nightwatch system. Under Mayor William Havemeyer, the NYPD was reorganized on May 13, 1845, with the city divided into three districts, with courts, magistrates, and clerks, and station houses. Within eight years this system showed weaknesses. The New York Times wrote in 1853, "Our police are inefficient. Worse has been said of them." Another publication delineated the situation much more precisely:

The most serious difficulty encountered by the police executive is the attempt to apply the regulations of the department to its own members. The departmental reports indicate a condition of utter lawlessness on the part of the police themselves: assaulting superior officers, refusing to go on patrol, releasing prisoners from the custody of other policemen, drunkenness, extorting money from prisoners — these are offences of daily occurrence, committed often with impunity.

It was Mayor Westervelt's stated aim to sort out the bad seed. In 1853 an administrative body was created, called the Board of Police Commissioners, consisting of Mayor Westervelt, the recorder and the city judge. Apart from the fact that the chief of police was selected by the mayor with the board's approval, the board had full powers of appointment and dismissal of all members of the force and was charged with general administrative duties.

In nothing was the undisciplined attitude of the police more clearly shown than in their refusal to wear uniforms. "Un-American", "undemocratic", "militarism", "King's livery", "a badge of degradation and servitude"—ideas of this kind formed the basis of opposition against Westervelt's wish to put policemen in uniform, mainly from the force itself and an influential number of citizens who deemed it "unrepublican" to put the servants of the city in livery. On June 24, 1854, there was a large, angry meeting of 1,000–1,500 policemen. The objects of the meeting were stated in a notice posted prominently in the streets and published in the morning papers:

A meeting of citizens, and all other who feel aggrieved at the ridiculous and oppressive rules, and regulations of the Commissioners of Police and especially that portion of the late order imposing an expensive and fantastical uniform, will be held in the Park.

Westervelt's position was clear: that a uniform incites a high degree of chivalrous sentiment, that it involves a "pride of cloth", and that the wearer knows that if he disgraces it he disgraces himself and the profession in which he serves. Westervelt earned many party enemies by his determined policy to keep appointments to the police force, which were then a large part of the patronage appertaining to the mayoralty, free from political influence.

=== Mayor Westervelt's influence on tourism ===
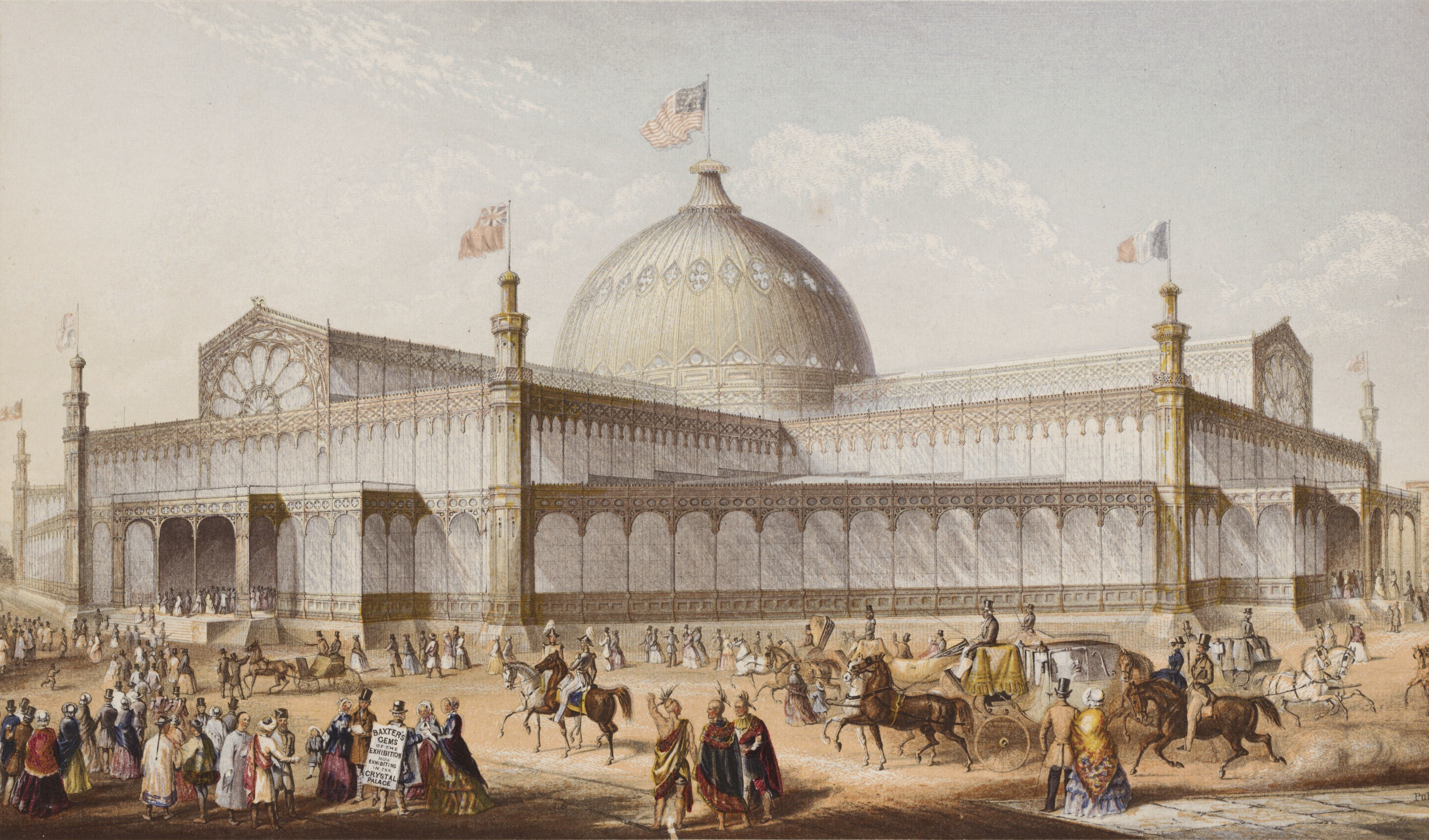
New York Crystal Palace: an 'oil-color' plate by George Baxter (September 1, 1853)

By the early 1850s New York had grown to sufficient size and prominence that the city decided to host a major exhibition of the type that London had pioneered in 1851. Such early exhibitions were forerunners of the later world's fairs. The Exhibition of the Industry of All Nations opened during the term of Mayor Westervelt on July 14, 1853, in a sparsely developed part of the city. Fortieth and Forty-second streets bounded the fair's four-acre site to the immediate west of the Croton Distributing Reservoir—today's Bryant Park. Within New York's Crystal Palace, designed by Karl Gildemeister, four thousand exhibitors displayed the industrial wares, consumer goods, and artworks of the nation. Westervelt was President of the Exhibition, which set off one of the first major tourism booms in New York; many hotels were built to handle the influx of visitors. Over one million people visited the Crystal Palace Exhibition, which closed on November 1, 1854 (in spite of its popularity, the exhibition's sponsors lost $300,000 on the venture). The structure remained standing after the fair, and was leased for a variety of purposes before being destroyed by fire on October 5, 1858.

=== Controversial opinions ===
==== Proposed reduction of Central Park ====
Mayor Westervelt did not shy away from unpopular decisions if he considered them to serve the general good. In 1853 the New York legislature designated a 750-acre (300 ha) area from 59th to 106th Streets for the creation of the planned Central Park, though the land alone cost over $5 million. At the time, the city's finances were declining, and Westervelt was concerned about overspending and the state's regulatory overreach in its decision to designate such a large area. There were several competing proposals to curtail the park, but no decision was made until March 1855, when the city's board of councilmen voted 14-to-3 to trim both the lower thirteen blocks (from 59th to 72nd Streets) and four hundred feet from each side of Central Park. However, on March 23, 1855, the new Democratic mayor, Fernando Wood, vetoed the measure.

==== Riots ====
The New York Draft Riots, the worst riots in United States history with respect to lives lost, took place during the Civil War in 1863, when immigrant factory workers forcibly resisted the federal government's military draft. In the United States, the period from 1820 to 1870 was generally characterized by conflicts on the domestic front, such as the police riots and the riots of the Know-Nothing movement. It was during Westervelt's term as mayor that some of the first Know-Nothing riots occurred. This nativist American political movement was empowered by popular fears that the country was being overwhelmed by Irish Catholic immigrants, who were often regarded as hostile to American values and controlled by the Pope in Rome. This body of thought was often propagated by street preachers. One of the most ambivalent characters was Reverend Mr. Parsons, who had been in the habit of regularly preaching on the wharves, in shipyards and other "obscure" places along the East and North Rivers. On December 11, 1853, he planted himself upon a pile of timber in the Westervelt & MacKay shipyard. His voice traveled far, and in the course of half an hour there was an assemblage of some ten thousand people. As a result of his speech a serious riot occurred and on the orders of Mayor Westervelt the preacher was taken into custody. Some Know-Nothinger hastened to the station house with the intention of liberating him. Finding no redress there, five thousand excited men marched to 308 East Broadway and surrounded the residence of Mayor Westervelt. Finding that he was absent from home, they contented themselves with daubing a large cross on the door.

The feelings of the members of this movement against the participation of foreign-born citizens in municipal affairs had grown very bitter, and Westervelt set himself so sternly against them that his house was mobbed again. Probably due to the paucity of support for his reformist efforts during his term, but also because he applied himself more and more to the business of shipbuilding again, Westervelt declined a renomination, which for him was equivalent to an election, and was succeeded as mayor by Fernando Wood. In 1857 Westervelt became a member of the New York State Assembly for Rockland County.

== Genealogy of the Westervelt family ==
=== Ancestors ===
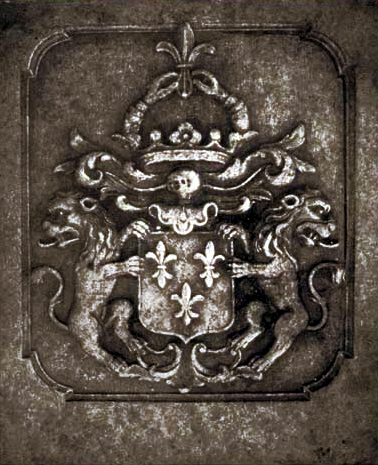
Arms of van Westervelt, as emblazoned on the family tomb, in the nave of the church in Harderwijk, Netherlands

Westervelt, as his name indicates, came from old Dutch stock. The name was known in the Netherlands at a very early period, and although the family members were not of nobility, they had been extensive property owners for many generations. The earliest mention of the Westervelts that has been recorded is of a Dirk van Westervelt and his family who resided in and around the town of Harderwijk for many years. Some individuals sharing that name appear to have been early inhabitants of Zwolle, and their descendants are still to be found there, known by the name Westerveld.

In the middle of the 17th century a few Westervelts lived in Meppel, situated a few miles from the eastern shore of the Zuiderzee, in the province of Drenthe and three miles east of Zwolle. Amongst them were two brothers, Willem and Lubbert Lubbertsen van Westervelt, both farmers and cattle raisers, who with their wives and children decided to move to the New World. They left Amsterdam on board De Hoop ("Hope") on April 8, 1662. On their arrival on May 24, 1662, New Amsterdam (which later became New York City) was suffering from a prolonged drought as no rain had fallen for eighty consecutive days. Lubbert settled near Hackensack, New Jersey and was one of the promoters of the Dutch Church organized there in 1686. Willem was a member of the Reformed Protestant Dutch Church in New Amsterdam (1667), whilst his son lived at New Utrecht on Long Island. This son sold his lands in 1706 and is supposed to have moved to New Jersey, where the family has been numerous and prominent for the past 300 years. William Lubbertsen van Westervelt with his wife and six children, and Lubbert Lubbertsen van Westervelt, with his wife and four children, became the progenitors of the van Westervelt/Westervelt family in America, and were at one time the second largest family in Bergen County, New Jersey. Jacob Aaron Westervelt was a seventh-generation descendant of Lubbert Lubbertsen van Westervelt.

=== Descendants ===
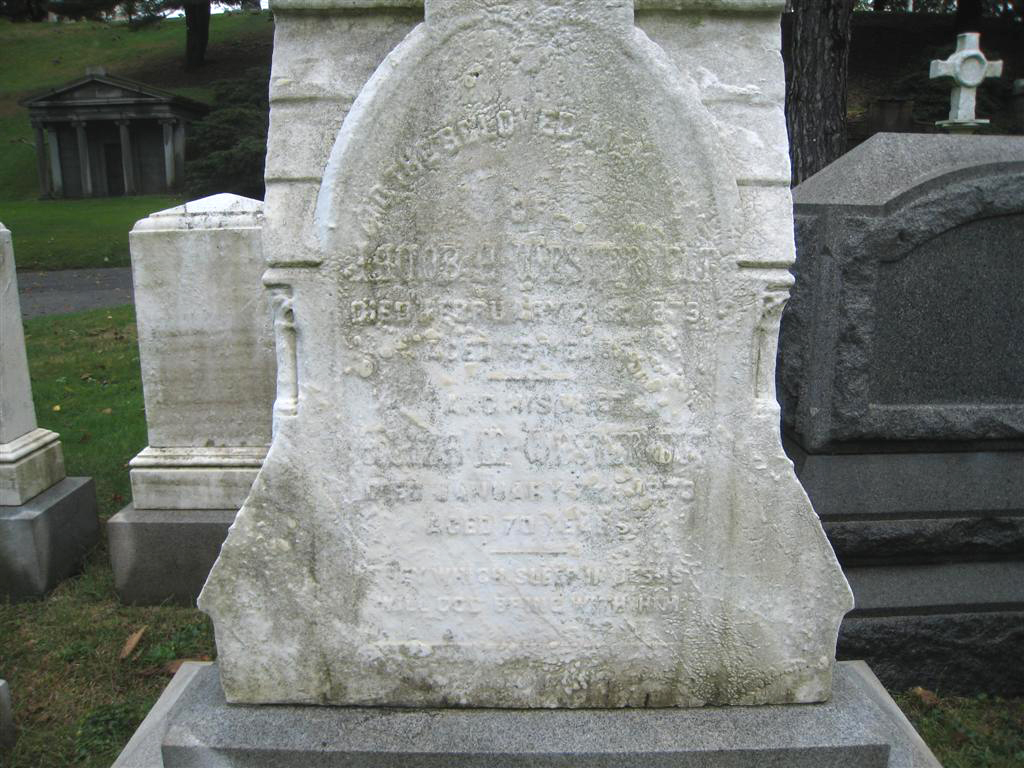
Grave of Jacob Aaron Westervelt at the Greenwood Cemetery, Brooklyn, New York. Plot: Section 100, Lot 9434

Westervelt married Eliza M. Thompson in New York City on April 25, 1825. They had eight children:

- John Albert, b. September 15, 1826
- Daniel Demarest, b. November 5, 1827; d. June 4, 1896
- Aaron Jacob, b. March 14, 1829; d. March 9, 1879
- James Thompson, b. October 5, 1830; d. in infancy
- Annie Halstead, b. May 12, 1832
- Sophronia, b. December 19, 1834
- Robert Carnley, b. November 25, 1837
- Eliza Mariette, b. July 16, 1841; d. April 21, 1891

Political offices
Preceded by Ambrose Kingsland	Mayor of New York City; 1853–1855	Succeeded by Fernando Wood
