= George W. Blunt =

Publisher of nautical charts and books

George William Blunt
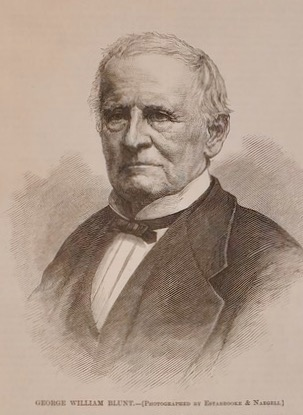
- Born: March 11, 1802; Newburyport, Massachusetts, United States
- Died: April 19, 1878 (aged 76); New York City, New York, United States
- Occupations: publisher, Office of New York Pilot Commissioner
- Spouse: Martha Garsett

George William Blunt (11 Mar 1802 – 19 Apr 1878) was a pioneer publisher of nautical charts and books for the company E & G. W. Blunt. He was Secretary of the Board of Pilot Commissioners for New York Harbor from 1845 to 1877. For over 40 years he served as first assistant in the United States Coast Survey and made surveys of New York Harbor and the Bahama banks. He was instrumental in gaining reforms in the United States Lighthouse Service. His firm published many editions of Bowditch's Navigator and Blunt's American Coast Pilot.

== Personal life ==
He was born on March 14, 1802, in Newburyport, Massachusetts, the son of the author Edmund March Blunt. He married Martha Garsett on December 22, 1821. They had two daughters.

== Nautical publisher ==
He and his brother, Edmund Blunt (1799-1866), went into business with their father, Edmund March Blunt, at E & G. W. Blunt Publishing, a well known publishing house of marine works. He authored many books and charts. He wrote the Memoir of the dangers and ice in the North Atlantic Ocean (1845), The Way to Avoid the Centre of Our Violent Gales (1868), and Pilot Laws, Harbor and Quarantine Regulations of New York (1869). Blunt's books were provided to the United States Hydrographic Office.

The firm closed in 1872 and sold the chart copyrights and plates to the Coast Survey and U.S. Navy Hydrographic Office.

== Board of Pilot Commissioners ==
In 1845, Blunt was appointed to the Board of Pilot Commissioners and became Secretary of the Board. He helped to organized the pilot service for the New York Harbor. He was re-elected by the Chamber of Commerce to the New York Board of Pilot Commissioners from 1868 to 1870. A pilots' license was issued by the Board of Pilot Commissioners. By 1873, Blunt was President of the Board of Pilot Commissioners. Today the board is called the Board of Commissioners of Pilots of the State of New York.

The pilot boat No. 11, George W. Blunt (1856) and its replacement in 1861 was named after him. The pilot boat Moses H. Grinnell was owned by George W. Blunt. It was built in 1850 and designed by George Steers.

On September 25, 1845, Blunt signed a letter to the editor of the Washington Union, to insert a message in the paper, which said he was the true and only owner of the Nettle, of New York, built in 1884 at Boston, Massachusetts. Per enrollment at the port of Boston and on July 19, 1844, he became the owner of the Nettle, and that James Calahan was the master or commander.

== Nautical School for the harbor of New York ==
In May 1869, Blunt became a trustee of the Nautical School for the harbor of New York. Its purpose was to educate boys in seamanship and navigation. He was elected again in 1871 and in 1874. Ellwood Walter was also a trustee during this time and shared the same interest in seamanship and navigation.

== Death ==
He died on April 19, 1878, in Manhattan, New York, New York, and was buried at the Green-Wood Cemetery in Brooklyn, New York.
