= Margaret Evans (1846) =

History

United States
- Name: Margaret Evans
- Owner: E.E. Morgan
- Builder: Westervelt & MacKay, New York
- Laid down: 1846
- Home port: New York City
- Fate: Sank September 1865 in New York on a voyage from Livorno

General characteristics
- Type: Full rigged packet ship
- Tonnage: 899
- Length: 158.2 ft (48.2 m)
- Beam: 35.3 ft (10.8 m)
- Height: 21.3 ft (6.5 m)
- Draft: 19 ft (5.8 m)
- Decks: 3 (originally 2)

The Margaret Evans was a full rigged packet ship laid down by Westervelt & MacKay. She was a regular fixture of the mid-19th century transatlantic packet trade, sailing passengers and cargo to New York from London, Liverpool and other British ports under the command of American Captain Edward Greenfield Tinker. She ferried scores of immigrants to North America, including the future wife of American businessman Warren L. Wheaton and members of the Putnam family. Her notoriety led to her memorialization in literature, visual art and song, and she is the subject of a well-known sea shanty, "Eliza Lee," which has been recorded by English folk singer Johnny Collins and Canadian folk-punk band The Dreadnoughts.

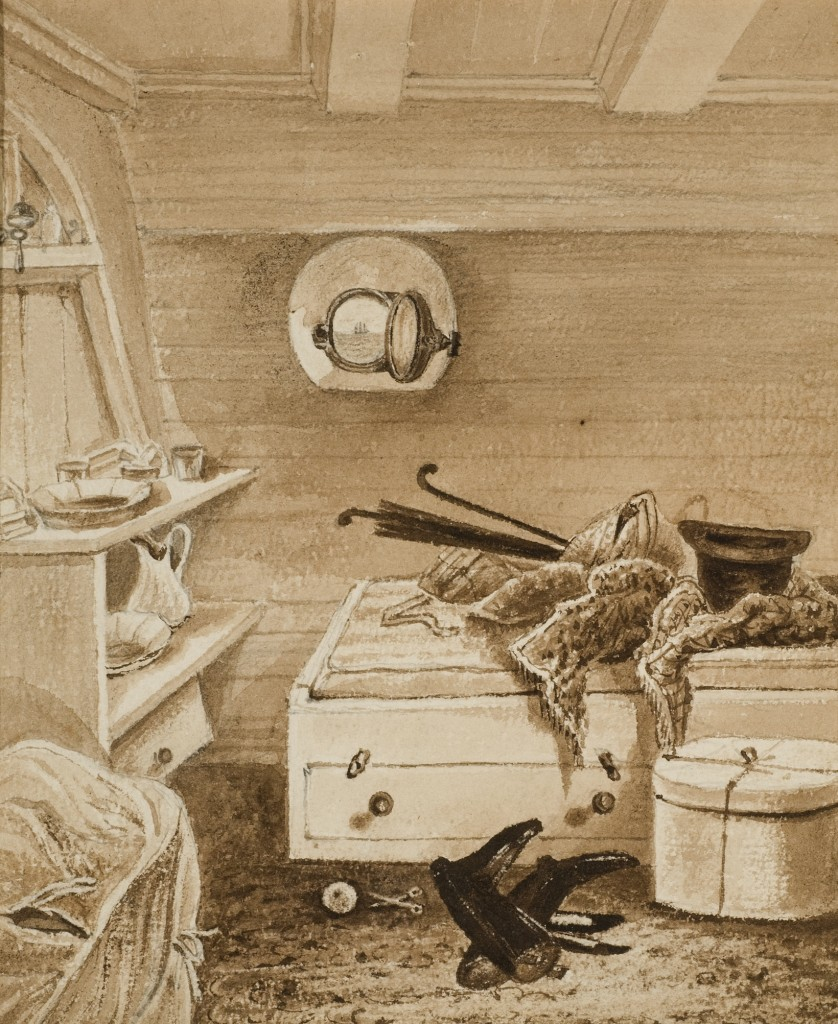
John A. Rolph (1799–1862), Stateroom on Packet Ship Margaret Evans, 1851. Watercolor on paper. Collection of The Paul Foundation
