= Sweepstakes (clipper) =

1853 clipper ship

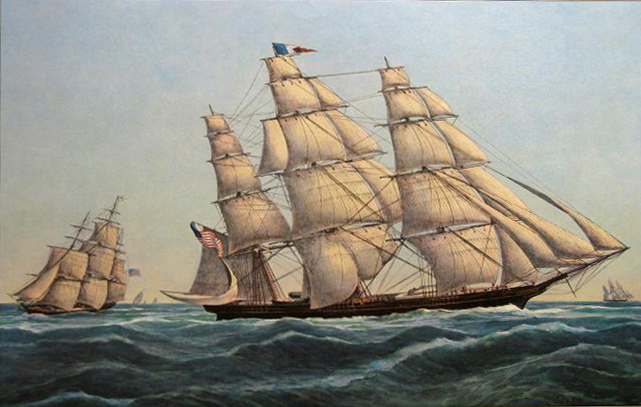
- Lithograph of Sweepstakes by Fannier Palmer and published by Nathaniel Currier in 1853

History

United States
- Name: Sweepstakes
- Owner: Chambers & Heiser, New York
- Builder: Daniel and Aaron Westervelt, New York
- Launched: 1853
- Fate: Ran aground on a reef in the Sunda Strait and damaged; sold for scrap on May 13, 1862

General characteristics
- Type: Clipper
- Length: 216.4 ft (66.0 m)
- Beam: 41.6 ft (12.7 m)
- Draft: 6.2 ft (1.9 m)

Sweepstakes was an 1853 clipper ship in the California trade. She was known for a record passage from New York to Bombay, and for a race around the Horn with three other clippers.

== Record set, New York to Bombay ==
Sweepstakes made a record passage from New York to Bombay in 1857, of 74 days, between May 9 and July 22. At the time, it was "one of the fastest passages on record between the two ports."

== California clipper ==
Sweepstakes was built at the height of the clipper ship boom, in 1853, when there was a high demand for quick transportation to the California Gold Rush. Forty-eight clipper ships were built that year. Sweepstakes was the last clipper ship built by the Westervelt shipyard.

Just the year before, in the autumn of 1852, "four splendid new clipper ships put to sea from New York, bound for California" in "the most celebrated and famous ship-race that has ever been run": Wild Pigeon, John Gilpin, Flying Fish and Trade Wind. "All ran against time; but the John Gilpin and the Flying Fish for the whole course, and the Wild Pigeon for part of it, ran neck and neck, the one against the other, and each against all. It was a sweepstake with these ships around Cape Horn and through both hemispheres."

Sweepstakes, though black-hulled like other clippers, bore a stripe of gold, found on only a few others like the N.B. Palmer, and was praised for her sleek lines and speed. The clipper bow of Sweepstakes was unusual, with an upright, curved stem, a straight keel, and a rockered, arched forefoot.

A rather dramatic mishap occurred during the launch. The ship was sliding down the ways towards the water when the rails gave way and spread out. The ship careened onto its side and remained toppled over for three days, until Tuesday, the 21st. The ship "struck the staging alongside and around the stern" of another clipper ship under construction, Kathay. A "large number" of spectators viewing the launch from Kathay were pitched into the water, but all were recovered without incident.

With the help of steam tugs and two floating derricks, Sweepstakes was brought to Brooklyn Navy Yard for inspection and repairs.

Afterward, the owners proposed a sweepstakes race for the new ship. "Messrs. Chambers & Heiser offer[ed] to sail the Sweepstakes, a clipper ship of 1600 tons, partially launched on June 18 from the ship-yard of Messrs. Westervelt & Sons, in this city, a race of 3000 miles, say 1500 out and return, each ship to pay an entrance of $10,000; the race to be subject to such rules and regulations as shall be prescribed by the New York Yacht Club.

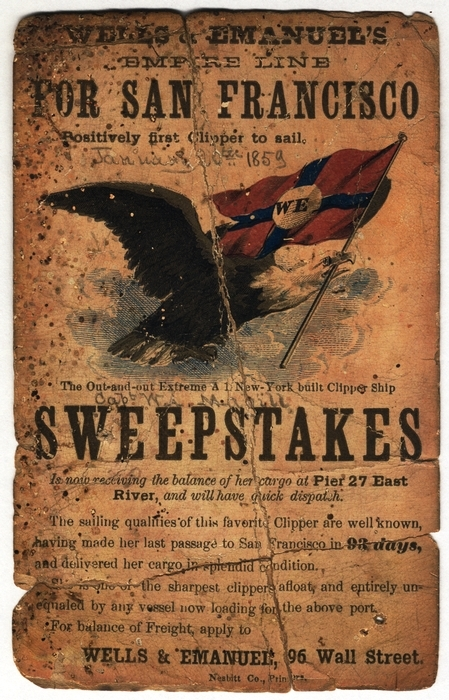
Sailing card

Of the California Clippers, which sailed between 1850 and 1860, Sweepstakes was one of eighteen ships that made passages between New York and San Francisco in less than 100 days. The fastest trip between New York and San Francisco was 89 days; Sweepstakes came in seventh, with a passage of 94 days.

Sweepstakes' ports of call included New York, San Francisco, Shanghai, Manila, Macao, Melbourne, Adelaide, and Bombay.

In the preface to his autobiography, Master of the Show, Augustus Pitou, a Broadway producer who spent fifty years in theater as a manager, playwright, and actor, claimed to have sailed to Australia aboard Sweepstakes as a cabin boy.

== Final voyage ==
Sweepstakes made its final voyage in 1862, from Adelaide to Batavia. The ship went aground on a reef in the Sunda Strait during this passage and was damaged. It was drydocked for inspection, and condemned. The ship was sold for scrap on May 13, 1862, for 15,000 florins.

== See also ==
- Jacob Aaron Westervelt
