= New York Board of Commissioners of Pilots =

Board of Commissioners of Pilots Of The State Of New York

Agency overview
- Formed: 1853
- Headquarters: 17 Battery Place, New York City, 10004
- Employees: Eight
- Agency executive: James E. Mercante, Commissioner and President
- Website: https://www.bdcommpilotsny.org

The Board of Commissioners of Pilots of The State Of New York is the New York state agency responsible for licensing and regulating pilots within one of the largest harbors in the world. It licenses and regulates up to 75 pilots of the Sandy Hook Pilots. They are called "Sandy Hook pilots" because they maneuver ships across a large and dangerous sand bar along the coast of New Jersey at the southern entrance of Lower New York Bay south of New York City.

The Board of Commissioners is a public agency, created in 1853 during the first session of the New York State Legislature, Chapter 467, Laws of 1853, to provide the selection, training, and regulation of New York pilots.

== History ==
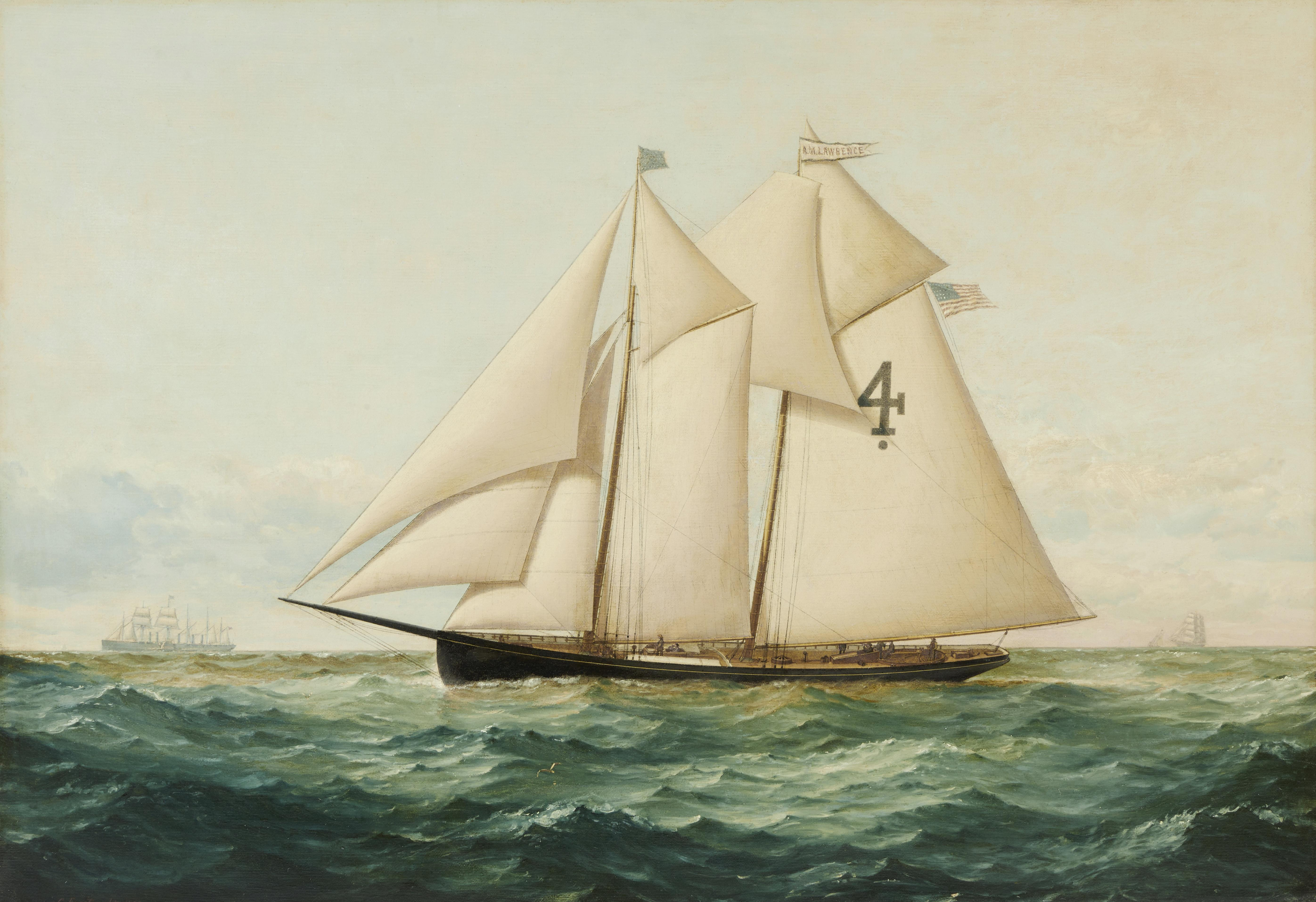
Pilot boat Alexander M. Lawrence, painting by Conrad Freitag.

In 1845, an unofficial Pilot Commission was established with two representatives from the Marine Underwriters and three from the Chamber of Commerce. Pilot boats working under the Underwriters' Commission took on licensed pilots that proved to be more insurable because of their strict rules and regulations. On June 26, 1845, George W. Blunt was appointed to the Board of Pilot Commissioners and became Secretary of the Board. Blunt helped to organized the pilot service for the New York Harbor. He was re-elected by the Chamber of Commerce to the New York Board of Pilot Commissioners from 1868-1870. By 1873, Blunt was President of the Board of Pilot Commissioners.

On June 30, 1853, the New York Legislature passed a Pilot bill that created the Board of Commissioners of Pilots. Today the board is called the Board of Commissioners of Pilots of the State of New York.

In 1893, the model of the pilot-boat Alexander M. Lawrence, No. 4, was exhibited by the Pilot Commissioners of New York at the 1893 Chicago World's Fair along with oil paintings illustrating the perils of the pilot service.

== See also ==
California Board of Pilot Commissioners
