= California Board of Pilot Commissioners =

California state agency

Board of Pilot Commissioners for the Bays of San Francisco, San Pablo, and Suisun
Agency overview
- Formed: February 25, 1850
- Headquarters: 660 Davis Street, San Francisco, CA 94111
- Employees: 4 permanent full-time staff, contractors
- Annual budget: $2.5 million (2017-18)
- Agency executive: Allen Garfinkle, Executive Director; Captain Joe Long, San Francisco Bar Pilot Association, Port Agent
- Website: http://www.bopc.ca.gov/

Board of Pilot Commissioners for the Bays of San Francisco, San Pablo, and Suisun is the California state agency responsible for licensing and regulating pilots within one of the largest harbors in the world and the tributary Sacramento River delta. It licenses and regulates up to 60 pilots of the San Francisco Bar Pilots Association. They are called "bar pilots" because they maneuver ships across a large and dangerous sand bar just outside the Golden Gate at the mouth of San Francisco Bay.

The Board of Commissioners was created in 1850 during the first session of the California State Legislature. Once an independent agency, the Board of Commissioners became a department of the California Business, Transportation and Housing Agency in 2009 and currently is part of the California State Transportation Agency. Surcharges paid by shippers on pilotage fees finance the work of the Commission, making it completely self-supporting.

== Jurisdiction ==
The commission's jurisdiction includes all of the bays and ports in the San Francisco Bay area, and the tributaries up to the ports of Stockton and Sacramento, and Monterey Bay. Pilots on other California waters operate under the authority of their federal (US Coast Guard) pilot’s license. Port of Los Angeles pilots are municipal employees. Port of Long Beach pilots work for a private contractor. Pilots in the ports of Humboldt Bay, San Diego, and Port Hueneme are commissioned or contracted with by their respective port authorities or districts. San Francisco bar pilots are required to hold Coast Guard licenses in order to be licensed by the Board of Pilot Commissioners.

== Commissioners ==
The commission has eight members appointed by the governor of California as follows.

- Secretary of the California State Transportation Agency who serves ex officio
- Three public members who are neither pilots nor work for companies that use pilots
- Two licensed pilots
- Two industry members, one from the tanker and one from the dry cargo shipping industry.

The first President of the Pilot Commission was Commander Cadwalader Ringgold, USN.

== History and significant incidents ==
The Board of Pilot Commissioners does not conduct a pilotage service, nor does it or has it ever owned or operated pilot vessels used by its licensees to board on and off ships. However some of the history of pilot boats used on San Francisco Bay may be of interest to the reader:

Some of the pilot boats used in San Francisco Bay have independent histories. The motorboat USS California was completed in 1910 and served in World War I on harbor patrol duty. The two-masted gaff-rigged schooner California, built as the racing sailboat Zodiac in 1924, was modified for pilot service after being acquired in 1931 by the San Francisco Bar Pilots Association for use as a pilot boat. California served as a pilot vessel until 1972 when the schooner was the last sailing pilot vessel in the United States. The schooner was purchased in 1978 and again named Zodiac. The vessel is one of few surviving sailing pilots still in existence. The two-masted gaff-rigged schooner Adventuress, launched in 1913, also saw service as a pilot boat, and during World War II served with the United States Coast Guard. The Zodiac and Adventuress are both listed with the National Register of Historic Places and are now cruising in Washington state after restorations.

The container ship COSCO Busan struck the fender system of Delta Tower of the San Francisco–Oakland Bay Bridge at 8:30 a.m. on 7 November 2007, causing damage to the ship as well as slight damage to the tower fender system. The ship's hull was breached, with damage to a water ballast tank and two fuel tanks, with approximately 53,653 gallons of fuel oil leaked and environmental contamination from the oil spill. The accident was investigated by the Board of Pilot Commissioners as well as by the US Coast Guard and the National Transportation Safety Board. The investigation by the Pilot Commission found misconduct by the licensed pilot in the form of pilot error in navigating the vessel and moved to revoke the pilot's license. However, the pilot surrendered his license before a hearing was held. The investigations by the Coast Guard and NTSB also found the pilot at fault. Neither investigation faulted the Commission's licensing nor oversight of the pilot in question.

In 2011, the Commission received and accepted a landmark study on pilot fitness, conducted by Dr. Robert Kosnik, B.Sc, M.D., D.I.H. of the University of California, San Francisco. This study formed the basis of new regulations concerning pilot fitness determinations within the jurisdiction of the Board and has the potential to set a new standard worldwide on pilot fitness for duty.

== See also ==
- New York Board of Commissioners of Pilots

== Bibliography ==
- Commandant, United States Coast Guard (March 2, 2009), Report of Investigation into the Allision of the COSCO Busan With the Delta Tower of the San Francisco—Oakland Bay Bridge in San Francisco Bay on November 7, 2007 (PDF), United States Coast Guard
