= Pilot boat =

Type of boat

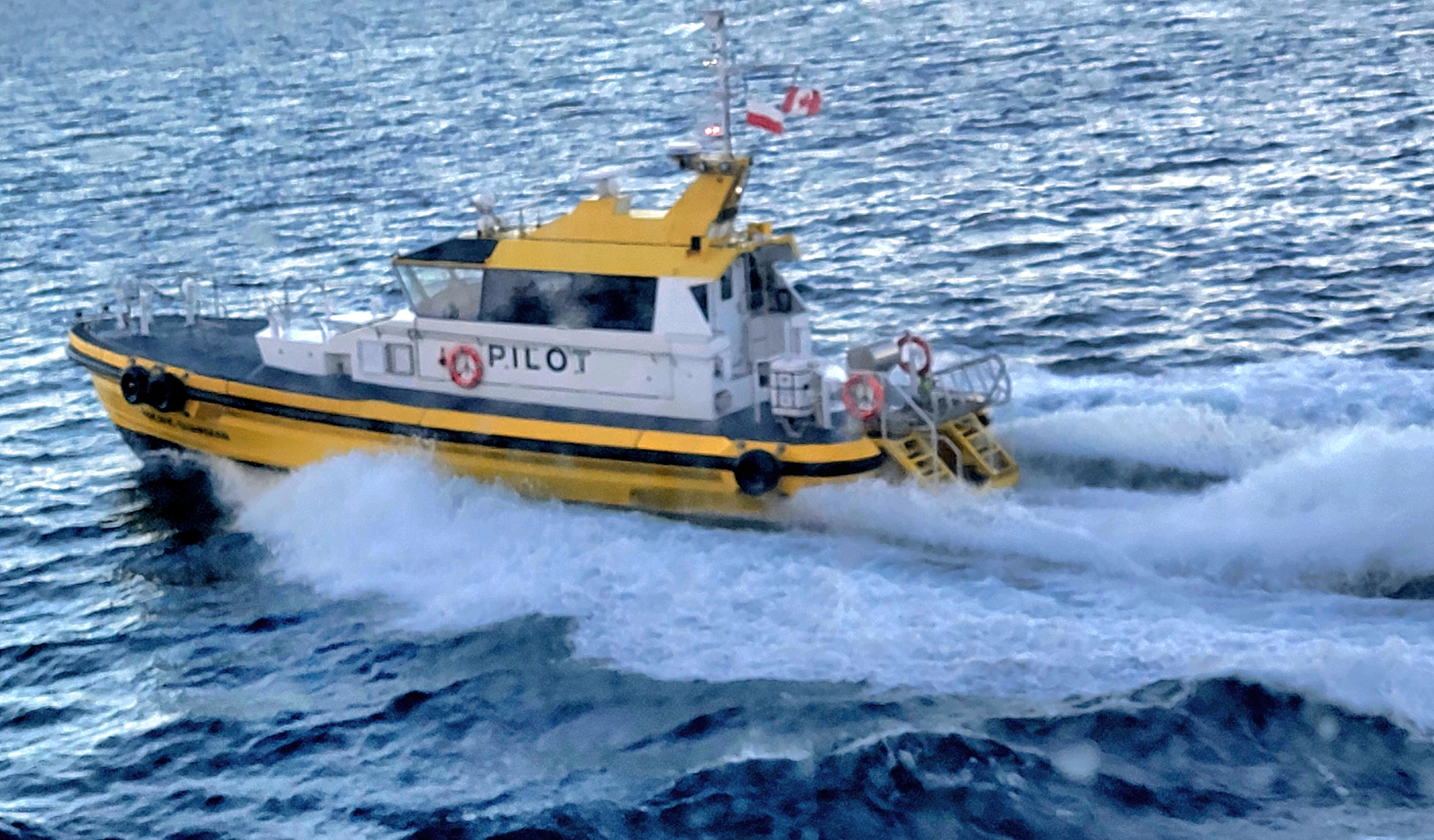
Pilot boat at Victoria, British Columbia

A pilot boat is a type of boat used to transport maritime pilots between land and the inbound or outbound ships that they are piloting. Pilot boats were once sailing boats that had to be fast because the first pilot to reach the incoming ship got the business. Today, pilot boats are scheduled by telephoning the ship agents/representatives prior to arrival.

== History ==
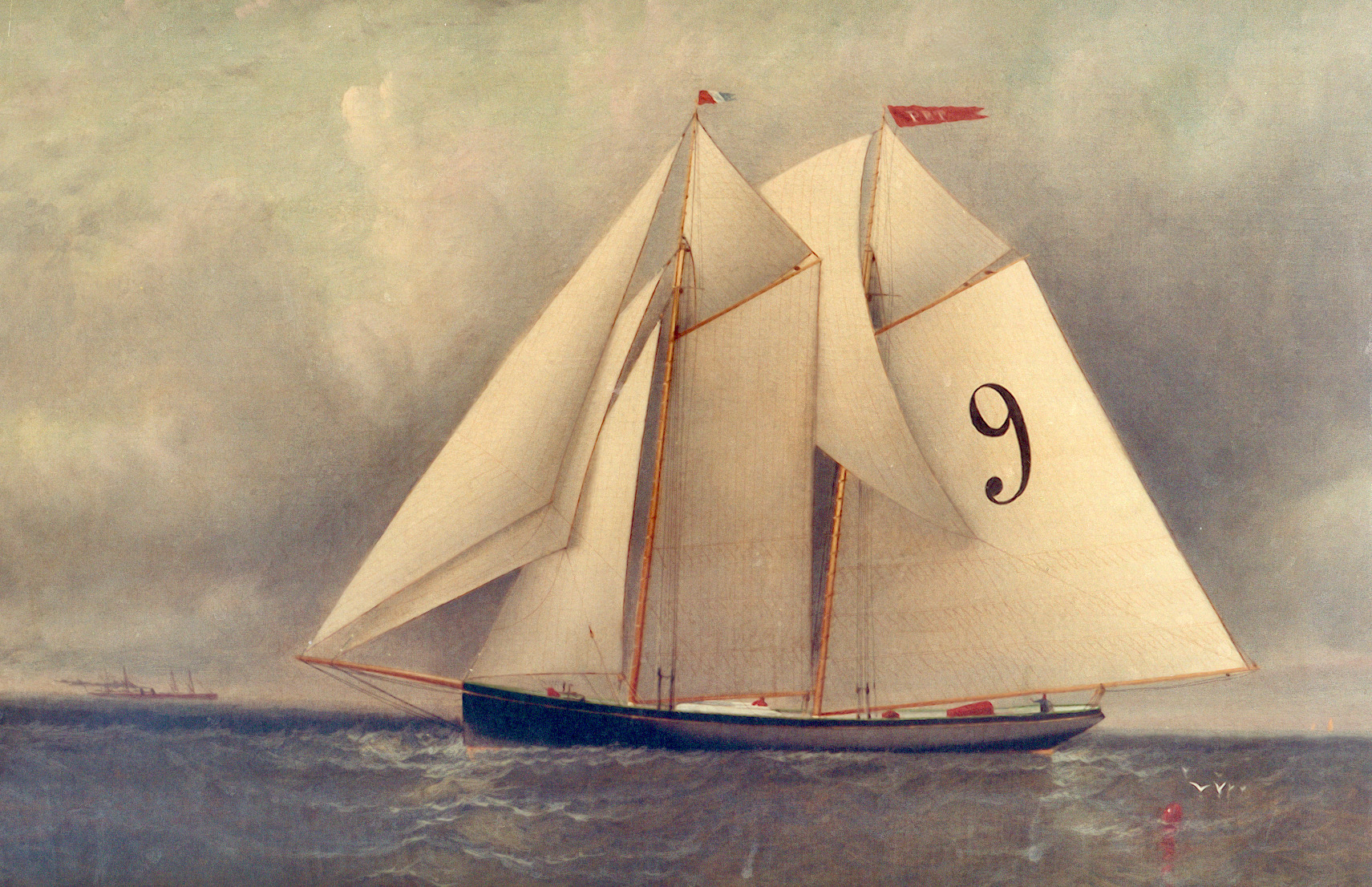
New York Sandy Hook pilot boat Pet, No. 9

Pilots and the work functions of the maritime pilot go back to Ancient Greece and Roman times, when incoming ships' captains employed locally experienced harbour captains, mainly local fishermen, to bring their vessels safely into port. Eventually, in light of the need to regulate the act of pilotage and ensure pilots had adequate insurance, the harbours themselves licensed pilots for each harbour.

Although licensed by the harbour to operate within their jurisdiction, pilots were generally self-employed, meaning that they had to have quick transport to get them from the port to the incoming ships. As pilots were often still dual-employed, they used their own fishing boats to reach the incoming vessels. But fishing boats were heavy working boats, and filled with fishing equipment, and so a new type of boat was required.

Early boats were developed from single masted cutters and twin masted yawls, and latterly into the specialist pilot cutter. These were effectively light-weight and over-powered single-masted boats with large, steeply angled keels, making them deep draft under power and shallow draft in lighter sail.

If legend is to be believed, the first official Bristol Channel pilot was barge master George James Ray, appointed by the Corporation of Bristol in May 1497 to pilot John Cabot's Matthew from Bristol harbour to the open sea beyond the Bristol Channel. In 1837 Pilot George Ray guided Brunel's SS Great Western, and in 1844 William Ray piloted the larger SS Great Britain on her maiden voyage.

In 2026, Artemis Technologies introduced its electric EF-12 Pilot hydrofoil. It uses carbon-fiber hydrofoils with a flight control system. The hydrofoils lifts the hull out of the water, reducing drag and minimizing wakes. It actively stabilizes ride height, roll, and pitch, steadying the deck for safe pilot transfer. It can travel at 32 kn (59 km/h; 37 mph), foil for 45–55 nmi (83–102 km; 52–63 mi), and recharge in under one hour.

== Use by country ==
=== United States ===
In 1840, there were only eight New York pilot boats. They were Phantom, No. 1; Washington, No. 2; New York, No. 3; Jacob Bell, No. 4; Blossom, No. 5; T. H. Smith, No. 6; John E. Davidson, No. 7; and Virginia, No. 8.

In 1860, there were twenty-one New York pilot boats and four under the New Jersey dispensation.

| Number | Ship Name | Tons | Number | Ship Name | Tons |
|---|---|---|---|---|---|
| No. 1 | Moses H. Grinnell | 90 | No. 12 | W. J. Romer | 90 |
| No. 2 | Edmund Blunt | 120 | No. 13 | Mary Ann | 70 |
| No. 3 | Charles H. Marshall | 110 | No. 14 | Edwin Forrest | 100 |
| No. 4 | Washington | 80 | No. 15 | J. D. Jones | 115 |
| No. 5 | David Mitchell | 80 | No. 16 | Christian Bergh | 100 |
| No. 6 | Mary and Catherine | 90 | No. 17 | Fannie | 80 |
| No. 7 | Ellwood Walter | 100 | No. 18 | James Stafford | 70 |
| No. 8 | Isaac Webb | 96 | No. 19 | Mary A. Williams | 90 |
| No. 9 | James Avery | 80 | No. 20 | Nettle | 65 |
| No. 10 | J. M. Waterbury | 80 | No. 21 | W. H. Aspinwall | 90 |
| No. 11 | George W. Blunt | 130 | | | |

In the spring of 1896, the New York and New Jersey pilots discarded pilot-boats and moved them to the Erie Basin in Brooklyn. They were for sale because of the change from wood and sail to steel and steam pilot boats.

=== Great Britain ===
In Great Britain, pilot boats were rigged as schooners in Fleetwood, Swansea and Liverpool. In Liverpool, Pioneer, No. 6 was built in 1852 and was 53-tons. The clipper George Holt, No. 10 was built in 1892.

=== India ===
The Bengal Pilot Service was established by the British East India Company to control piloting. The pilot boats were responsible for guiding East Indiaman, and other vessels, up and down the Hooghly River between Calcutta and the sea.

== Some historic pilot boats still sailing ==
- Eighteen Bristol Channel Pilot Cutters are believed to survive worldwide
- German pilot schooner, Elbe, No. 5 was launched in 1883 and had a long history as pilot boat, as private yacht named Wander Bird and later as home to hippies in San Francisco, before returning to Germany and being restored as a traditional sailing boat
- German pilot schooner Cuxhaven was launched in 1901 and survived as a sailing boat, renamed Atalanta and still active as a traditional sail training ship
- US motorboat USS California was completed in 1910 and served in World War I on harbor patrol duty
- US two-masted gaff-rigged schooner Adventuress launched in 1913, saw service as a pilot boat, and during World War II served with the United States Coast Guard
- US two-masted gaff-rigged schooner Zodiac was built as a racing sailboat in 1924 and named California after being acquired by the San Francisco Bar Pilots Association for use as a pilot boat
- US schooner Roseway, built in 1925, owned by the Boston Pilot Association for thirty years until 1973, now a registered U.S. National Historic Landmark operating in Boston and St. Croix, USVI by World Ocean School, Camden, Maine
- US pilot boat Moses H. Grinnell was built in 1850 and designed by George Steers. It was owned by George W. Blunt. In 1863, the Moses H. Grinnell was hit by the steamer Union on the outer Middle Ground. The Moses H. Grinnell was named after Moses H. Grinnell, a successful New York merchant and shipper.

The Zodiac and Adventuress are both listed with the National Register of Historic Places and are now cruising in Washington state after restorations.

== Modern pilot boats ==
Modern pilot boats can be from 7 metres to over 25 metres (23–82 ft) in length, built to withstand heavy seas and bumping against 100,000-ton tanker and cruise ships. They are high-powered and hence both very quick and durable purpose-built boats. They are normally painted a highly visible colour such as orange, red or yellow.

In terms of design, monohull hullforms are most commonly used, though examples of catamarans, SWATHs and Wave Piercing Hulls also exist. Although some pilot boats are still constructed from steel, the need to travel quickly means lighter weight materials such as aluminium, fibreglass and composites are now commonly used. In some instances, such as the Berkeley Class vessels produced in Australia, a combination of materials is used.

== Signalling ==
Pilots identified pilot boats with a large number on the mainsail and by flying a large pilot flag, bisected vertically into two colours, usually white and blue, which added to the boat's visibility. In distress, they would fire rockets and blue-lights at night. A brass signal gun was carried to be used when there was fog and sometimes on fair days.

Pilot boats are specially marked to indicate their function. During the day they fly the "H" flag and normally the word PILOT (or PILOTS) is written in clearly visible, large, letters on the sides.

At night they have special navigation lights: in addition to the "normal" navigation lights, a pilot boat has a white round light at top and below that a red round light, while a fishing vessel has the red light at top and the white light below.

To remember this, some people use the mnemonic "white cap, red nose" to reflect the idea that pilots consumed a lot of alcohol while waiting for ships, thus the white captain's cap with a red nose below it.

Pilot boats often also use bright colours, like flashy yellow, to make them clearly visible and distinctive in even the worst conditions. This last mainly applies to the so-called pilot tenders: the vessels that go to the ships to bring the pilot on board of arriving ships or pick them up from departing ships. Depending on the local situation the tenders might be launched directly from a nearby harbour or they are coming from the central (large) pilot station: a pilot boat located at a pre-defined location at sea near a pilotage area. In earlier days nearly all pilots came from a "pilot station" at sea, but with the modern very fast tenders it is often more practical not to have a permanently staffed pilot station at sea, but transfer the pilots directly to/from shore.

== Gallery ==
Pilot boats

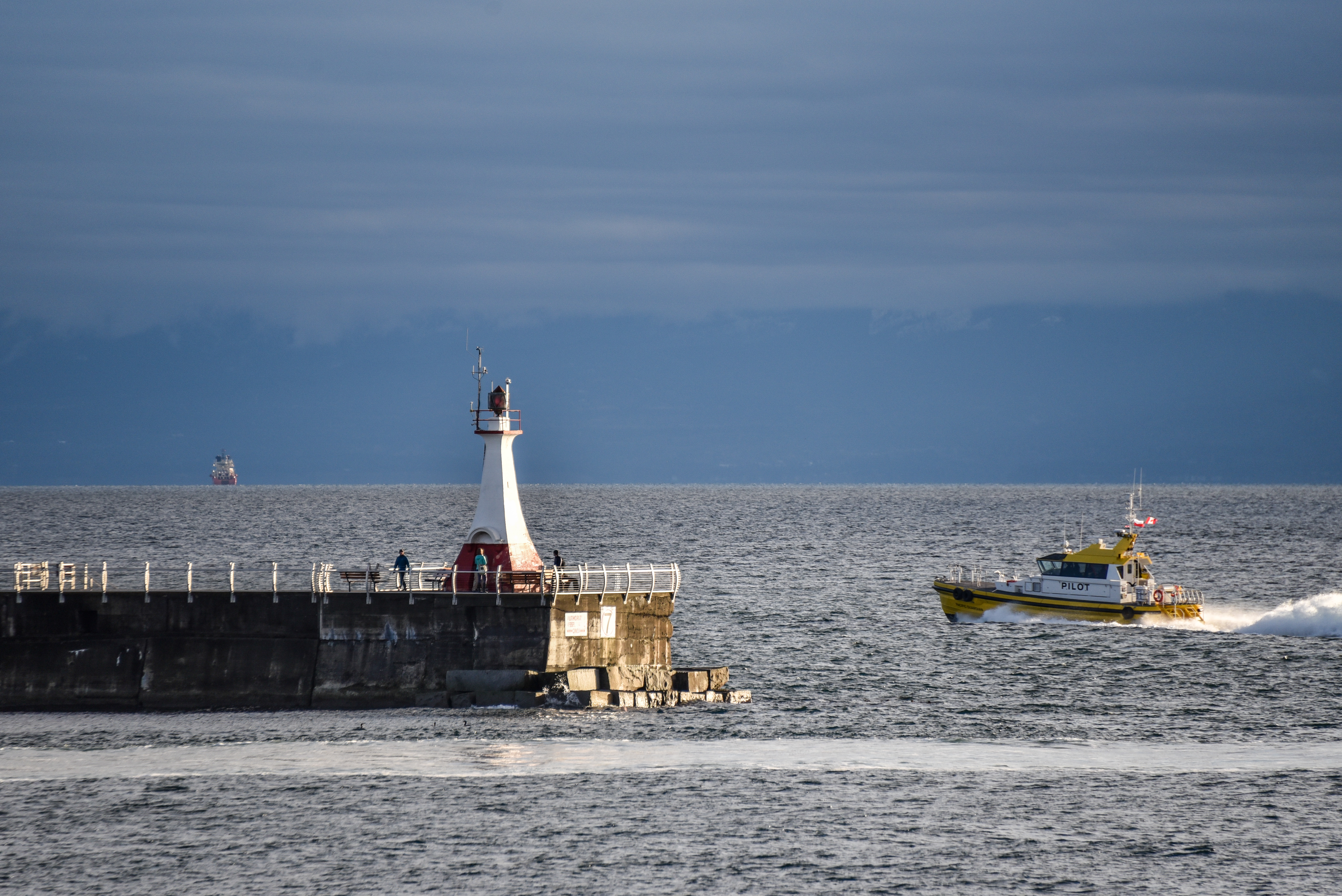
Pilot boat rounding lighthouse at Victoria, Canada and heading out to guide in a ship

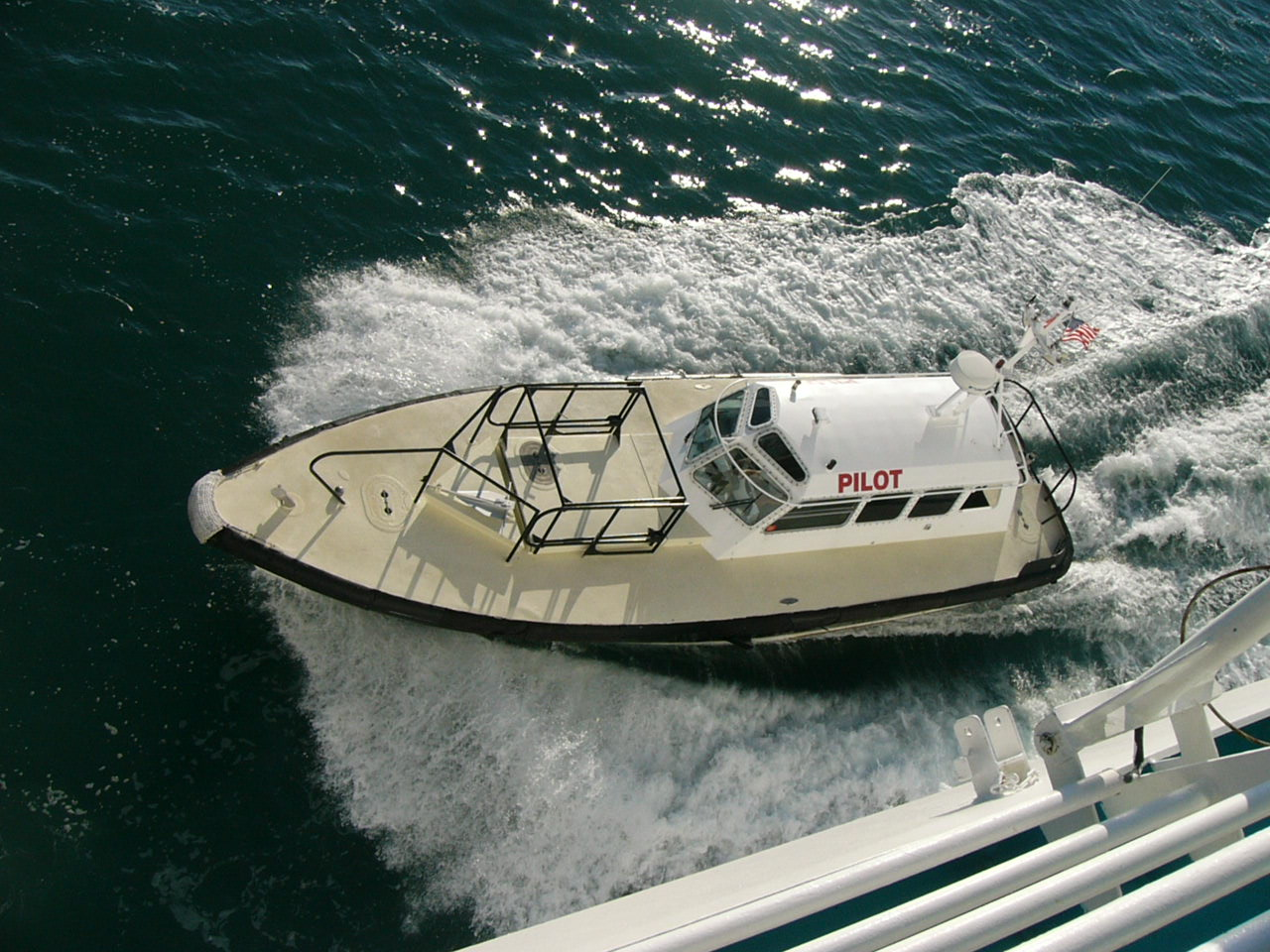
Pilot boat pulls alongside a cruise ship

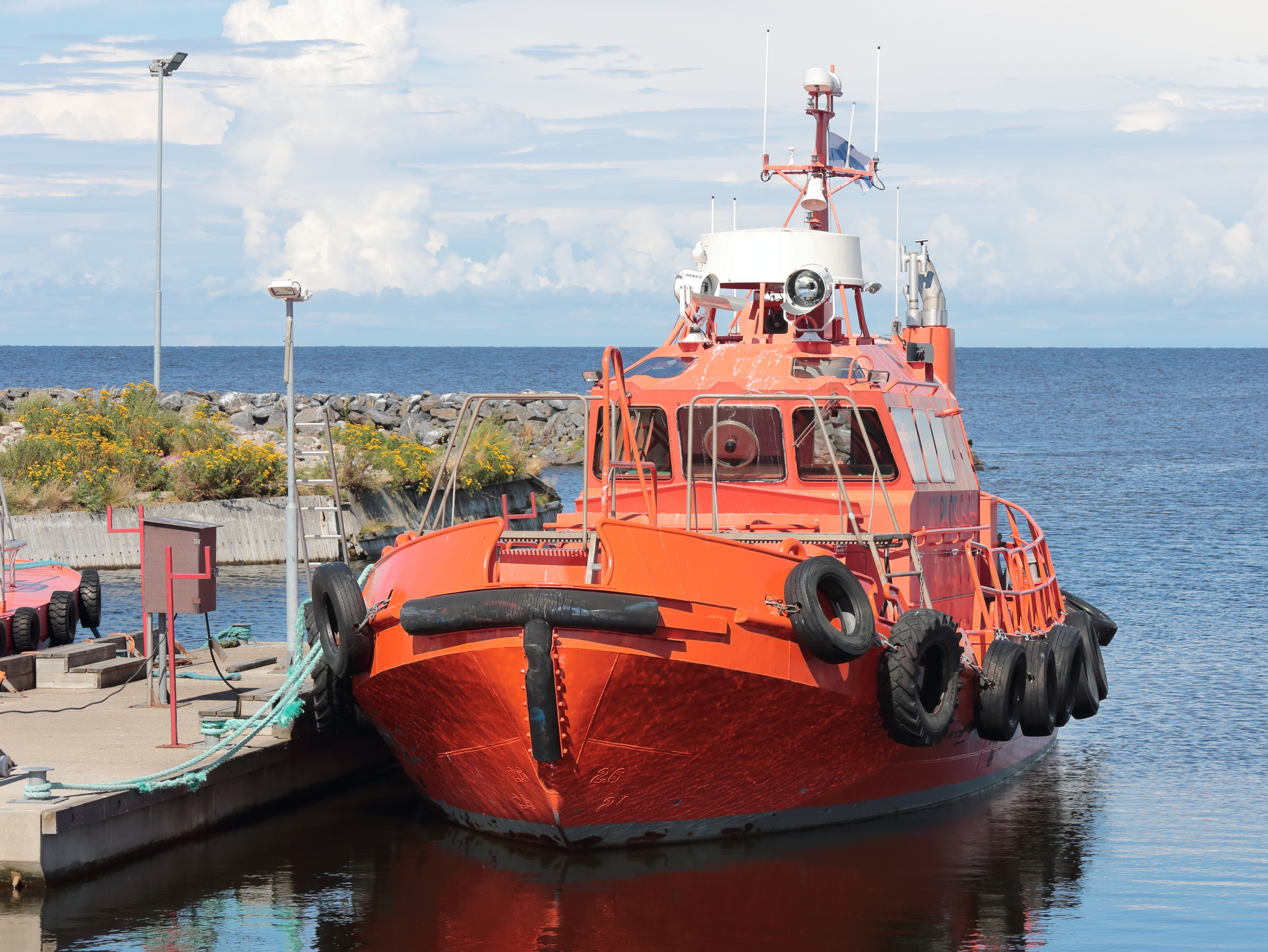
An orange-coloured pilot boat at berth in the Marjaniemí harbour in the Hailuoto Island, Finland

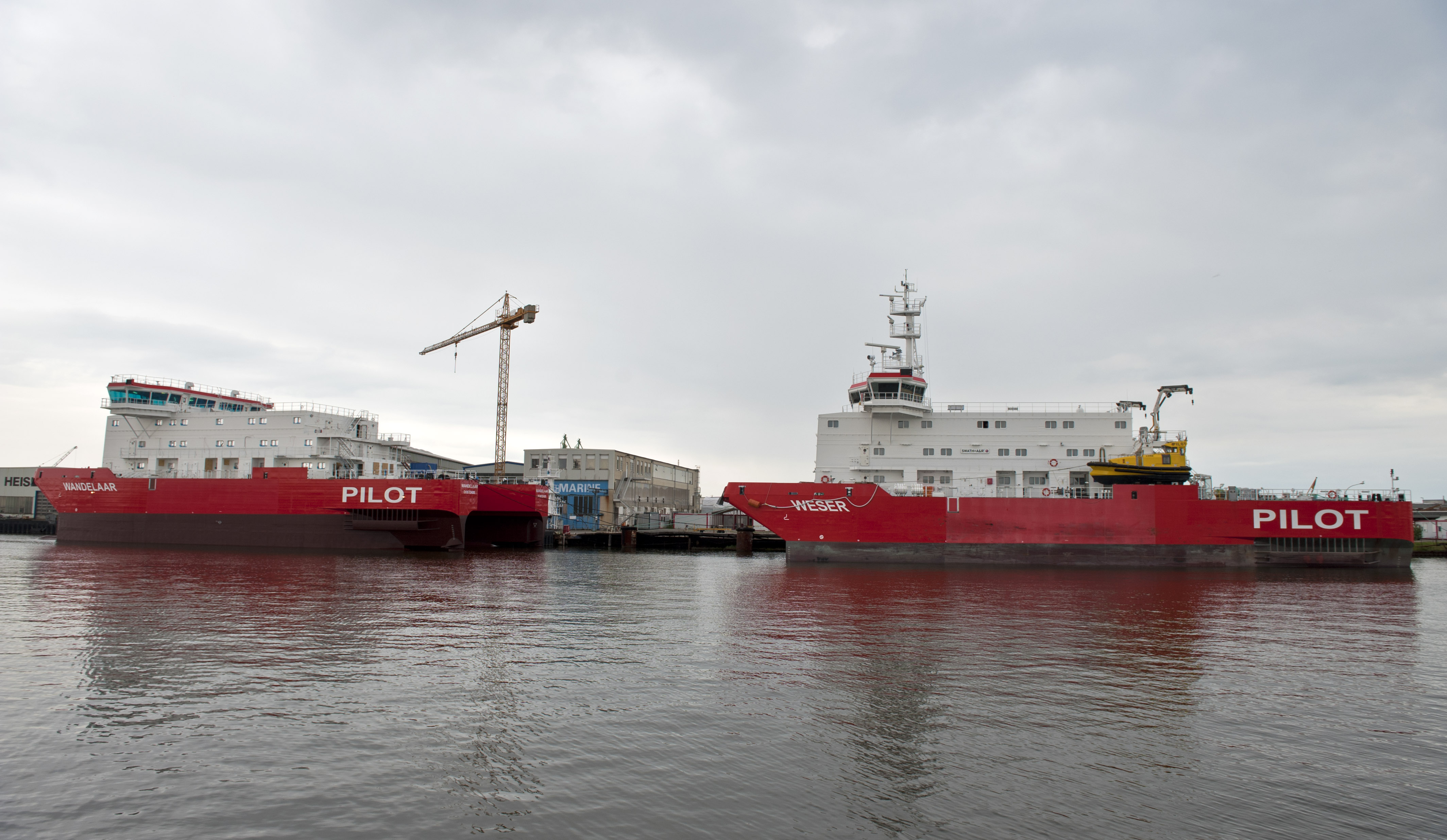
German pilot boats, normally stationed at sea

H(otel) signal flag

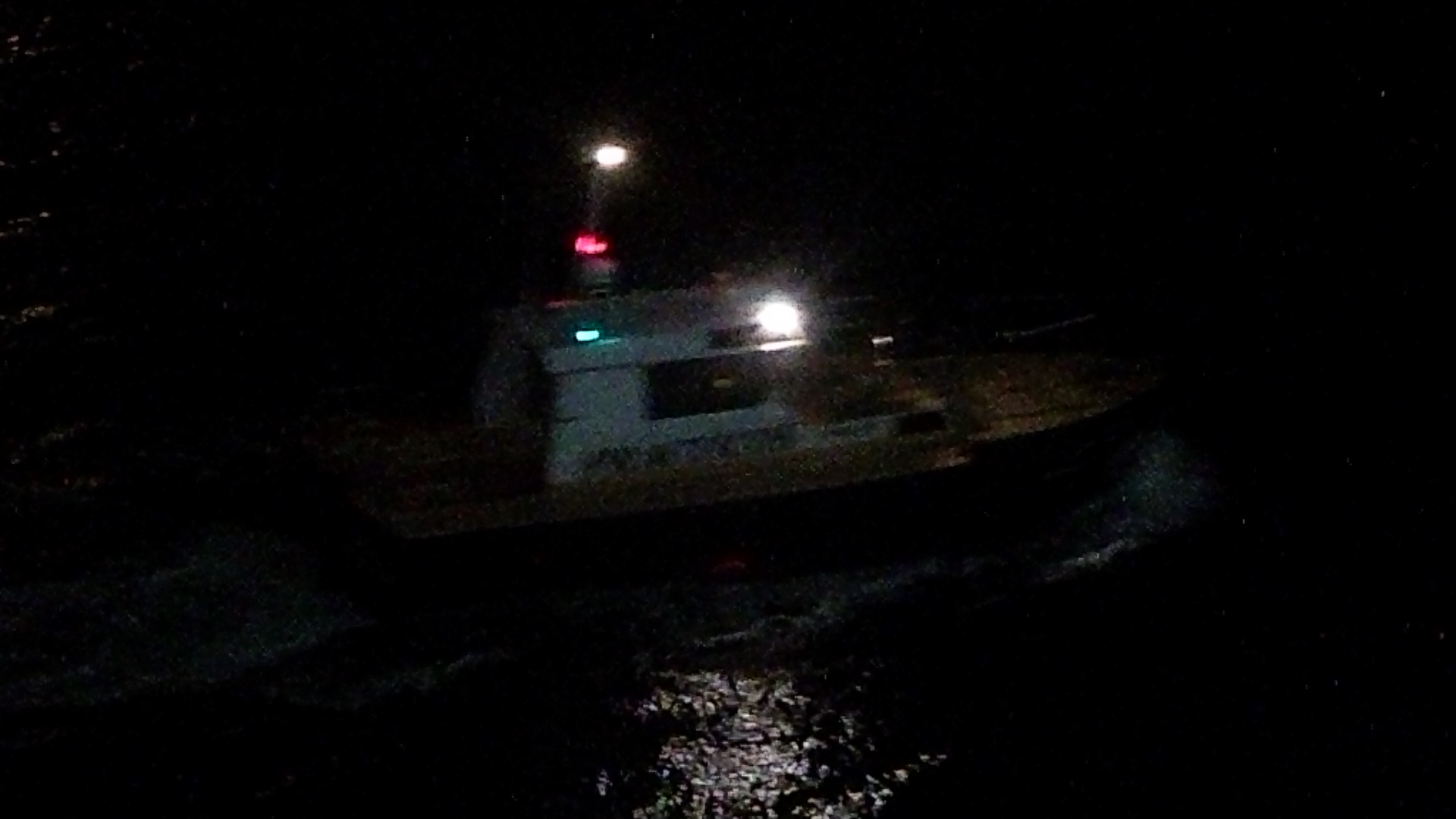
Pilot boat at Almería, Spain, showing the white-over-red night lighting

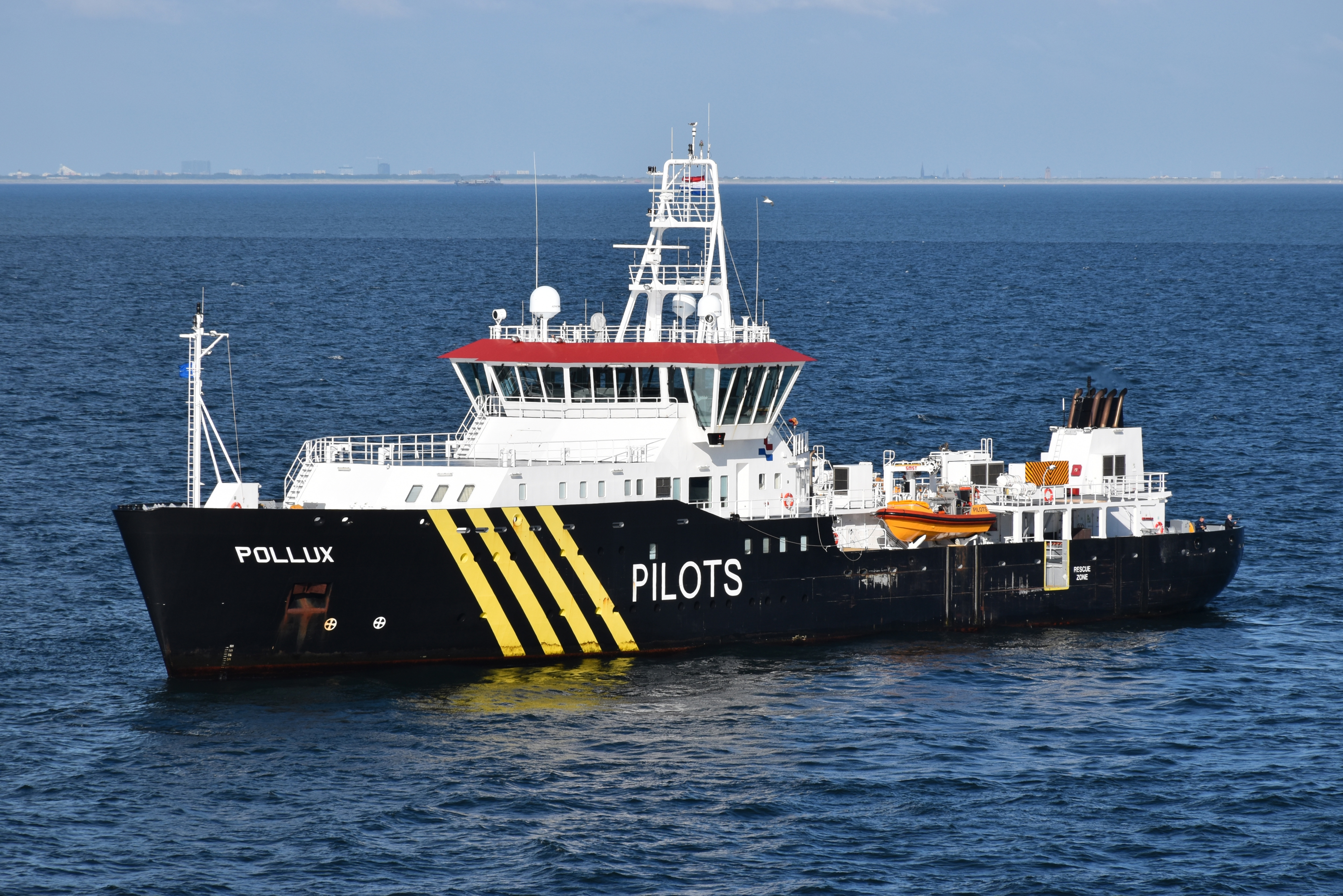
Pilot boat Pollux serving the port of Rotterdam

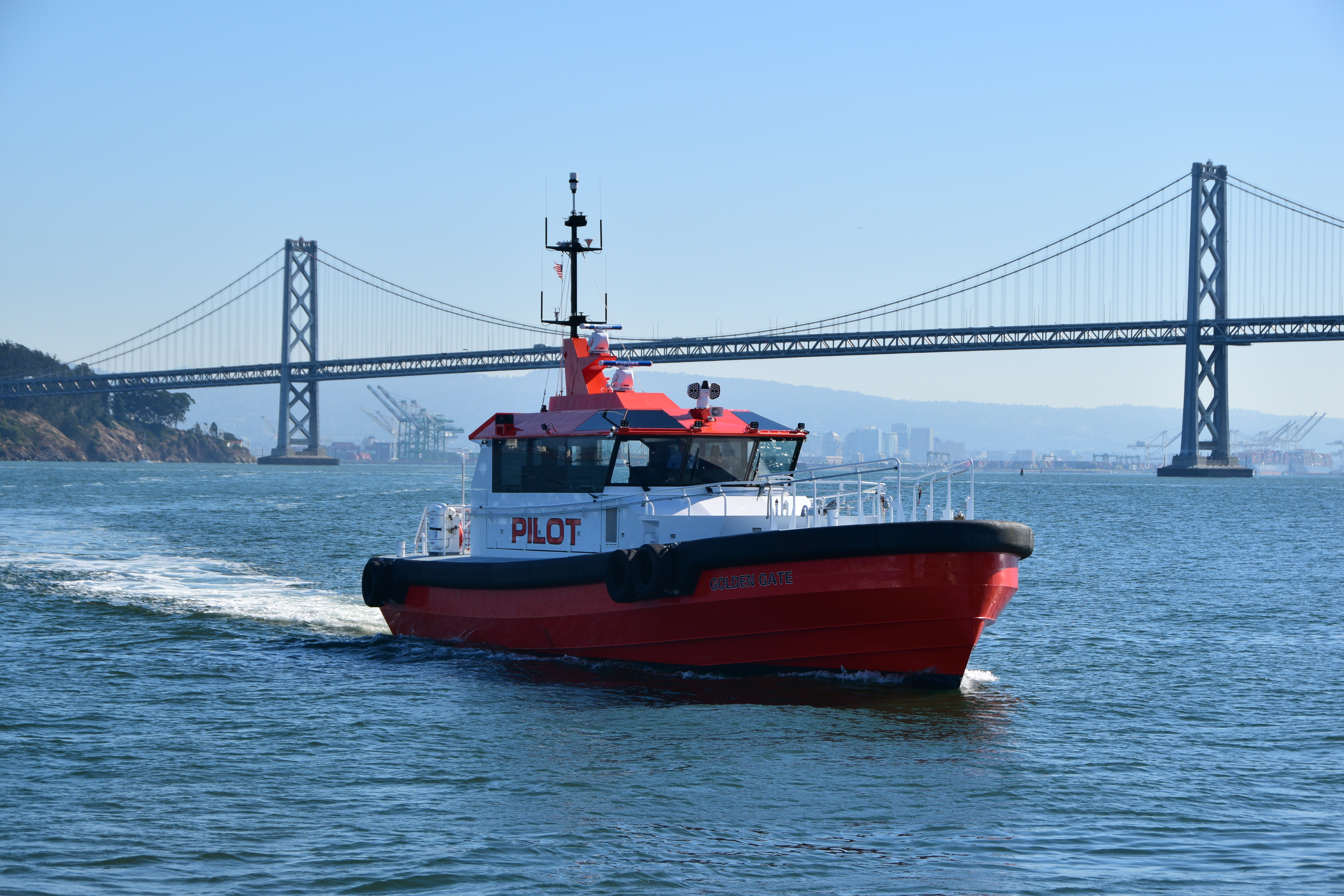
Pilot boat Golden Gate in San Francisco Bay soon after launch

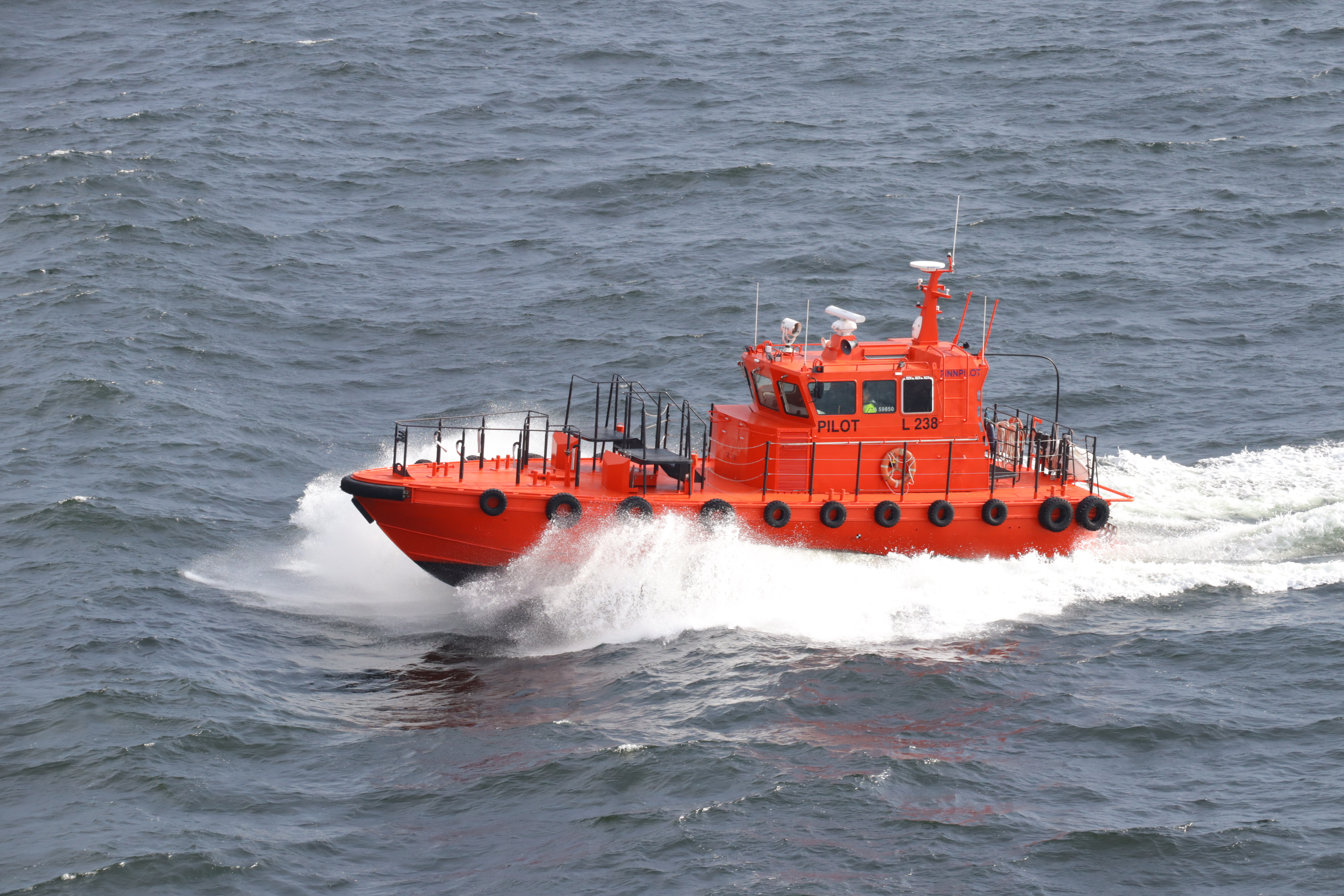
Pilot boat L 238 off the coast of Helsinki.

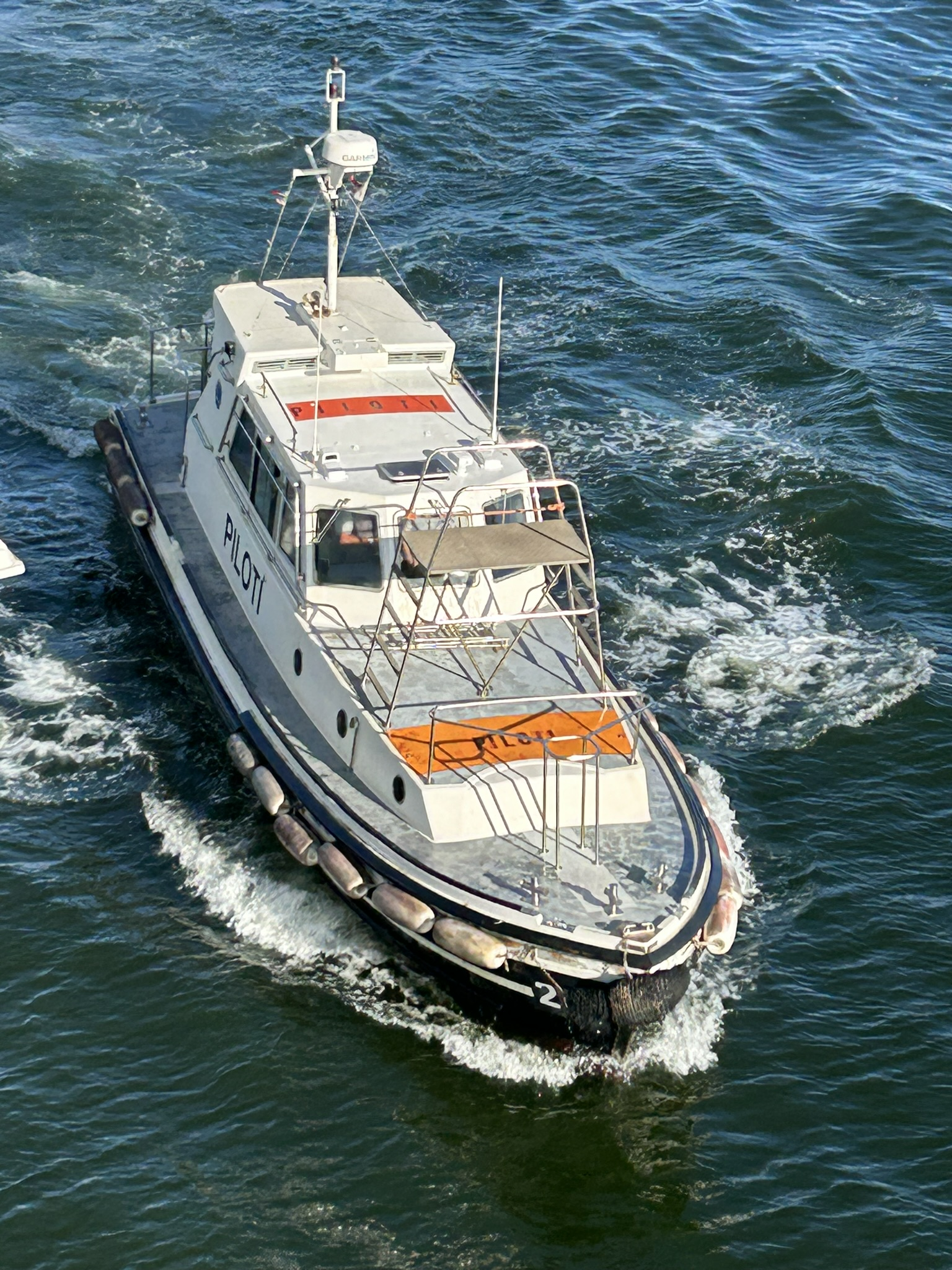
A pilot boat off Sicily, Italy

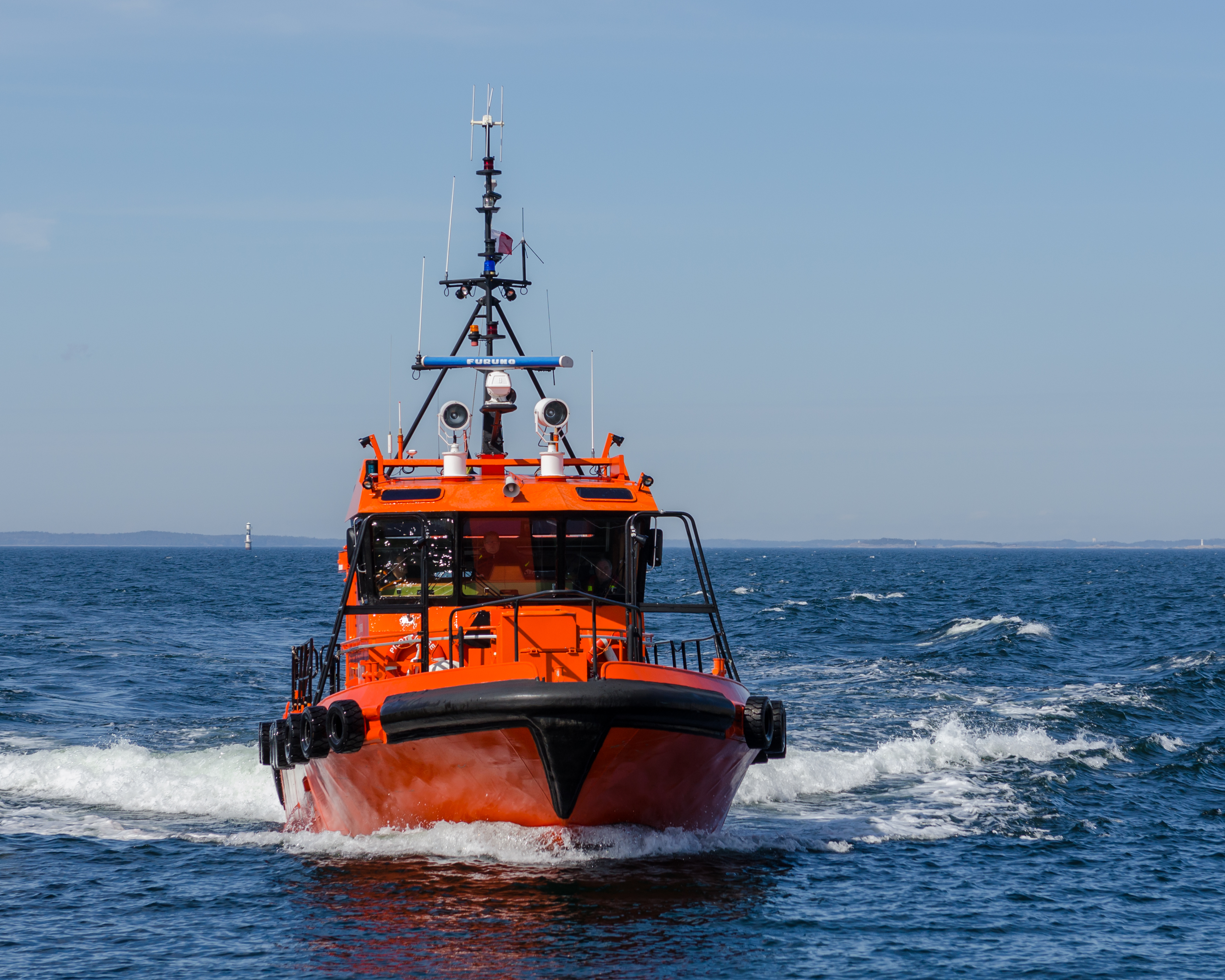
A pilot boat outside Öja island (Landsort), Stockholm archipelago's southernmost point.
