= Adventuress =

Adventuress may refer to:

- A female adventurer
- A gold digger
- Adventuress (schooner)
- The Adventuress, American title of the 1946 British drama film I See a Dark Stranger
- An Adventuress, a 1920 American drama film directed by Fred J. Balshofer
