= Dinghy =

Type of small boat

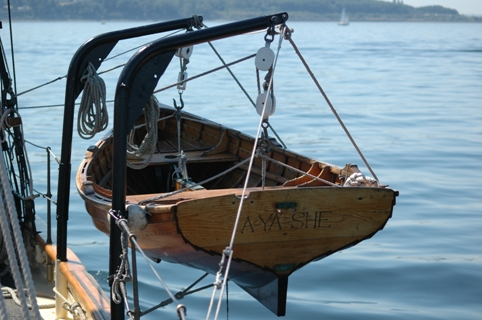
- A-ya’-she, dinghy of the schooner Adventuress

Development
- Designer: Various
- Location: Worldwide
- Year: Various
- No. built: Varies
- Builder: Various
- Role: Small boat

Boat
- Draft: Varies

Hull
- Type: Monohull
- Construction: Wood, fiberglass, aluminum, inflatable
- Beam: Varies

Rig
- Rig type: Varies (e.g., cat rig, sloop)

Racing
- Class association: Dinghy

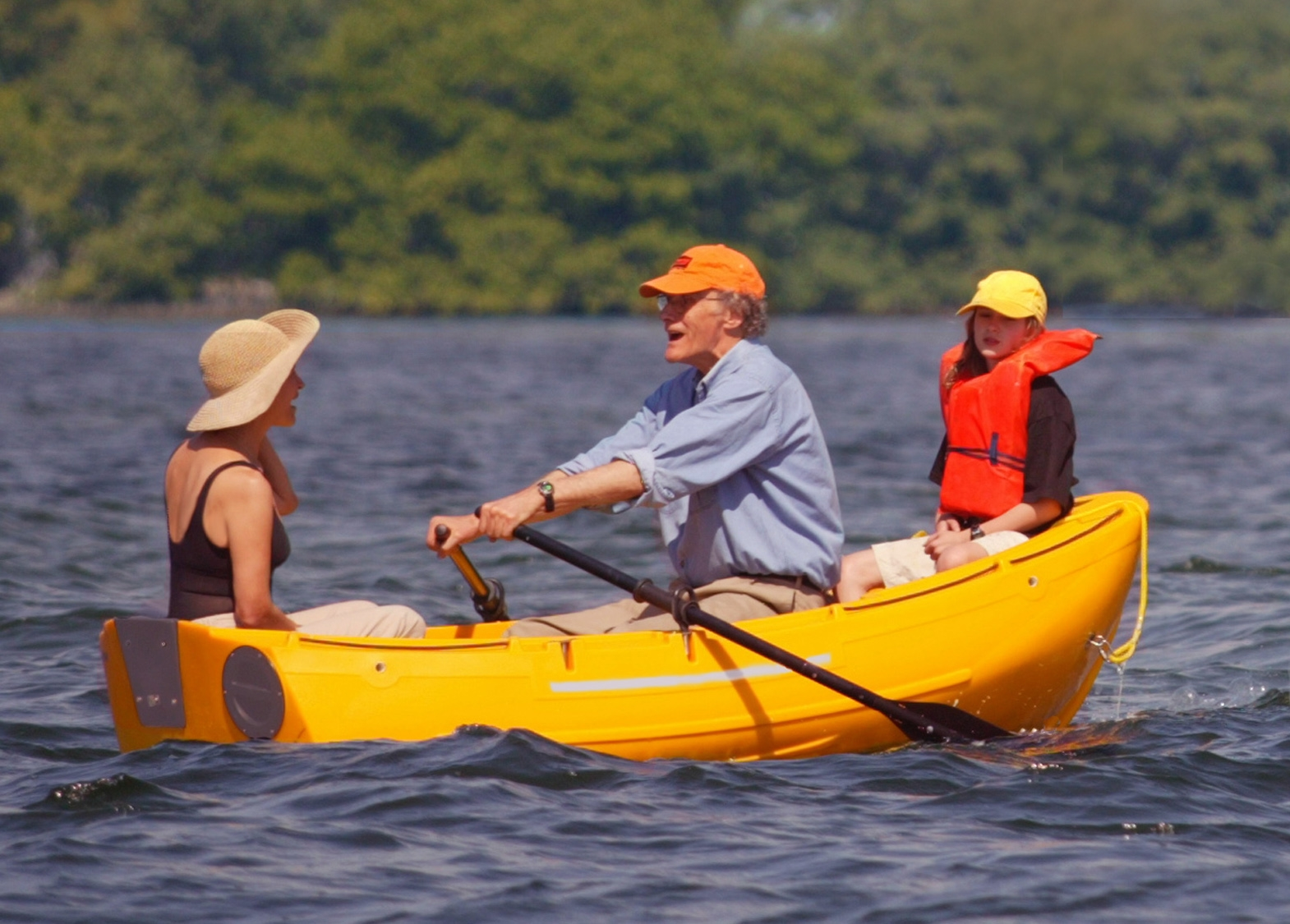
Safety dinghy, yacht tender

A dinghy is a type of small boat, often carried or towed by a larger vessel for use as a tender. Utility dinghies are usually rowboats or have an outboard motor. Some are rigged for sailing but they differ from sailing dinghies, which are designed first and foremost for sailing. A dinghy's main use is for transfers from larger boats, especially when the larger boat cannot dock at a suitably-sized port or marina.

The term "dinghy towing" sometimes is used to refer to the practice of towing a car or other smaller vehicle behind a motorhome, by analogy to towing a dinghy behind a yacht.

== Etymology ==
The term is a loanword from the Bengali ḍiṅgi, Urdu ḍiṅgī, and Hindi ḍiṅgī. (Note: The word ḍiṅgi means small boat, and is a diminutive of the Telugu word ḍiṅgā, meaning boat. The British Royal Navy adopted the word to designate the smallest ship's boat.)

== Definition and basic description ==
The term "dinghy" has some variability in its definition, but is generally a small open boat which may be powered by oars, sail or an outboard motor. Some individual examples have the option of being powered by all three of these methods, some by two, and some by just one means of propulsion. A dinghy does not have a cabin or a fixed hydrodynamic or ballast keel. The upper size limit is often stated as 20 feet (6.1 m) length. Particularly small examples are 6 feet (1.8 m) long. Dinghies used as ship's boats, particularly in naval use, are often stated as having a size range of 12 to 14 feet (3.7 to 4.3 m) or 12 to 16 feet (3.7 to 4.9 m).

Dinghies are designed for a range of uses. Some are intended as a tender for a larger vessel. Others are small utility boats, used where a larger boat is not needed. Many are designed primarily for sailing. These fall into two groups: those intended for racing and those for non-competitive leisure use.

A rigid-hulled dinghy can be made of wood (using either traditional or modern techniques), fibreglass or, more recently, moulded polypropylene. Inflatable dinghies solve some of the storage problems for tenders for yachts, though a fast inflatable boat powered by a powerful outboard motor would not be considered a dinghy. The inflatable life rafts which equipped British military aircraft during World War 2 (and for a period before and after) were called dinghies.

== Types ==
Dinghies usually range in length from about 1.8 to 6.1 m (6 to 20 ft). Larger auxiliary vessels are generally called tenders, pinnaces or lifeboats. Folding and take-down multi-piece (nesting) dinghies are used where space is limited. Some newer dinghies have much greater buoyancy, giving them more carrying capacity than older boats of the same size.

- Prams are usually short with transoms at both bow and stern. They are difficult to tip and carry a lot of cargo or passengers for their length but are slower to row because of their short length and extreme rocker; a skeg or bilge runners can make a difference, and even without they will row better than an inflatable.
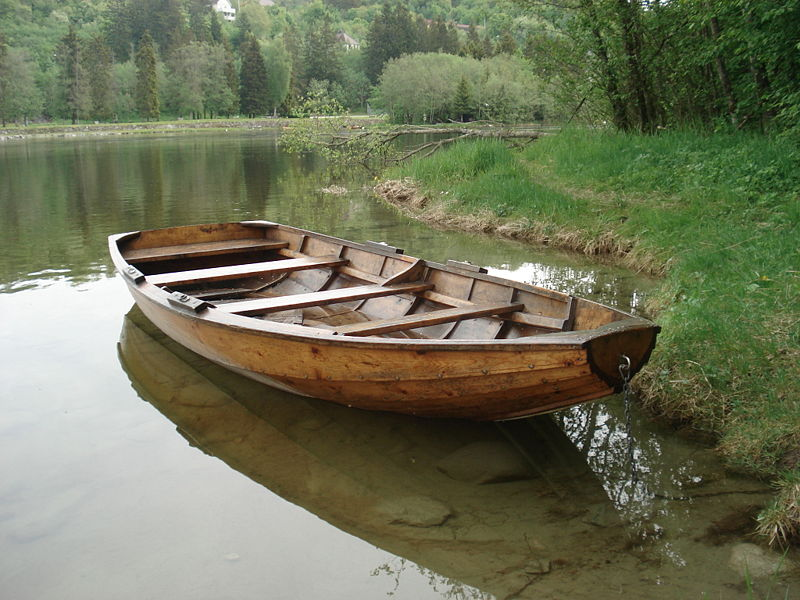
  A Norwegian pram
  Popular as tenders on sail boats with limited deck space.
- Some inflatable boats have a rigid deck and transom which allows an engine to be used for propulsion. They row poorly and do not tow well because of their blunt bows and large wetted surface area, but they are exceptionally buoyant.
- Rigid safety dinghies are designed to row, motor, tow, and sail. In addition to their self-rescue lifeboat functionality, these boats serve as everyday tenders and as recreational boats. They are extremely buoyant or unsinkable and have great carrying capacity relative to length (see photo above).

== Space issues ==
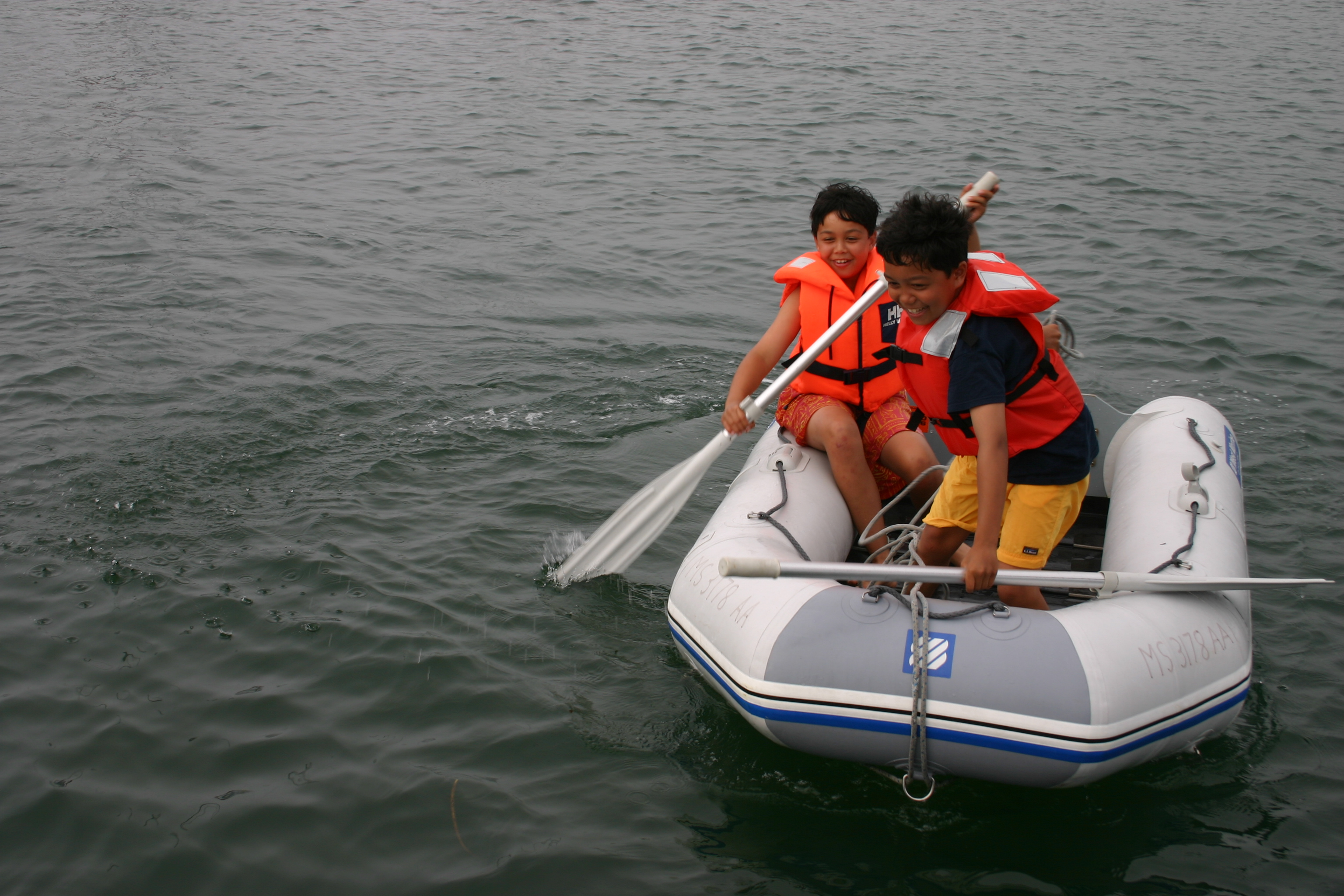
Inflatable dinghy

On yachts shorter than 10 m (32 ft 10 in), there is usually not enough room for a reasonably sized dinghy. A dinghy is useful to avoid the need for expensive dock or slip space, so owners of small yachts compromise by carrying a small rigid dinghy or deflated inflatable, or by towing a larger dinghy. Space can be saved by storing items in containers or bags that are tied to the dinghy. Dinghies are sometimes used as lifeboats. Recently, self-rescue dinghies have returned to use as proactive lifeboats that can be sailed to safety.

Rigid dinghies for small yachts are very small, about 2 m (6 ft 6 3/4 in), usually with a pram (blunt) bow to get more beam (width) in a shorter length. Larger dinghies are towed and should have reserve buoyancy, an automatic bailer, and a cover to prevent them from being lost at sea. Most masters prefer a tow cable long enough to put the dinghy on the back side of the swell to prevent the dinghy from ramming the transom of the yacht.

Inflatables are inconvenient to tow and take extra time to inflate but are very compact and fit easily into place while at sea. Space can also be saved by using a sectional two-piece rigid dinghy that is towed while in harbour and disassembled into two nesting pieces while off-shore; typically the bow section fits inside the stern and is stored upside down on deck. There are several types of collapsible rigid dinghy that dismantle into a series of flat panels for easy stowage.

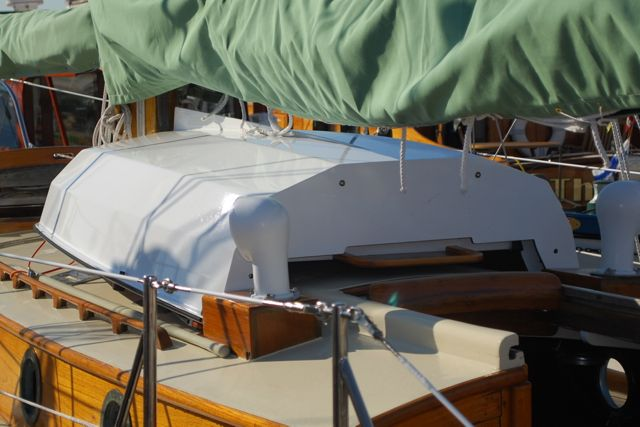
Nestable dinghy on sailboat cabin

Inflatable tubes can be fitted to an existing hard dinghy, increasing buoyancy and stability.

== Hardware and materials ==
A dinghy should have a strong ring on the bow. The ring secures the painter (the line that anchors the boat to a dock), and is used for towing and anchoring. Ideally, the dinghy should also have two other rings (one on each side of the stern transom) which, with the bow ring, are used for lifting and securing the dinghy for stowage.

The only other essential pieces of hardware are rowlocks (also known as oarlocks). Conventionally, a dinghy will have an oar on each side. A single sculling oarlock or notch on the transom is less common, but requires less space; and is used with a single sculling oar moving back and forth, never leaving the water, as used on a sampan.

Many modern dinghies are made of synthetic materials. These require minimal care and do not rot but can suffer from fibre glass pox which is caused by the ingress of saltwater through the gel coat. Inflatable dinghies can be made of fabrics coated with Hypalon, neoprene or PVC. Rigid dinghies can be made of glass-fibre reinforced plastic (GRP) but injection-moulded one-piece hulls are also available. Other materials for modern rigid dinghies include aluminium, marine plywood which tends to be much lighter than most types and, with the advent of sturdy, UV resistant polyurethane varnishes, wood. Some wooden dinghies (especially of classic or historical form) are built using the carvel or clinker methods. Favoured woods, in order of rot-resistance, are white oak, black locust, species of cedar and pine, true as well as African and Asian mahoganies, fir and spruce. Rot resistance depends on paint as well as protection from rainwater. Plastic hardware is sometimes used, but bronze and stainless steel are good corrosion-resistant materials for hardware, although stainless steel can be subject to crevice corrosion after many years especially in a boat using an outboard or other motor and must be inspected. Stainless steel should never be used for fittings permanently in the water. Owners should check that the correct grade of stainless steel is used in a fitting. Working boats may use lower-cost galvanized steel, but the hardware may need to be re-galvanized or replaced eventually.

The dinghy is generally carried inverted amidships on yachts, on top of the coachroof where there is the most space. It is useful for a dinghy carried this way to have handholds built into the bottom, making launching easier and providing handholds on deck.

Most yachts launch their dinghies by hand or with a simple lifting tackle rigged from the main mast. Davits over the transom is convenient and elegant, but sailing in a heavy following sea could cause the loss of a dinghy. If a dinghy is towed, an extra line with a loop in the end (known as a lazy painter) can be attached to a dinghy so that if the towing line breaks, there is a line to grab with a boat hook. This makes retrieval easier at sea, especially if the boat is partially swamped.

In some countries dinghies have names or registration numbers. On hard dinghies these are usually on the bow, on inflatables on the inside of the transom.

== Propulsion ==
=== Oars ===
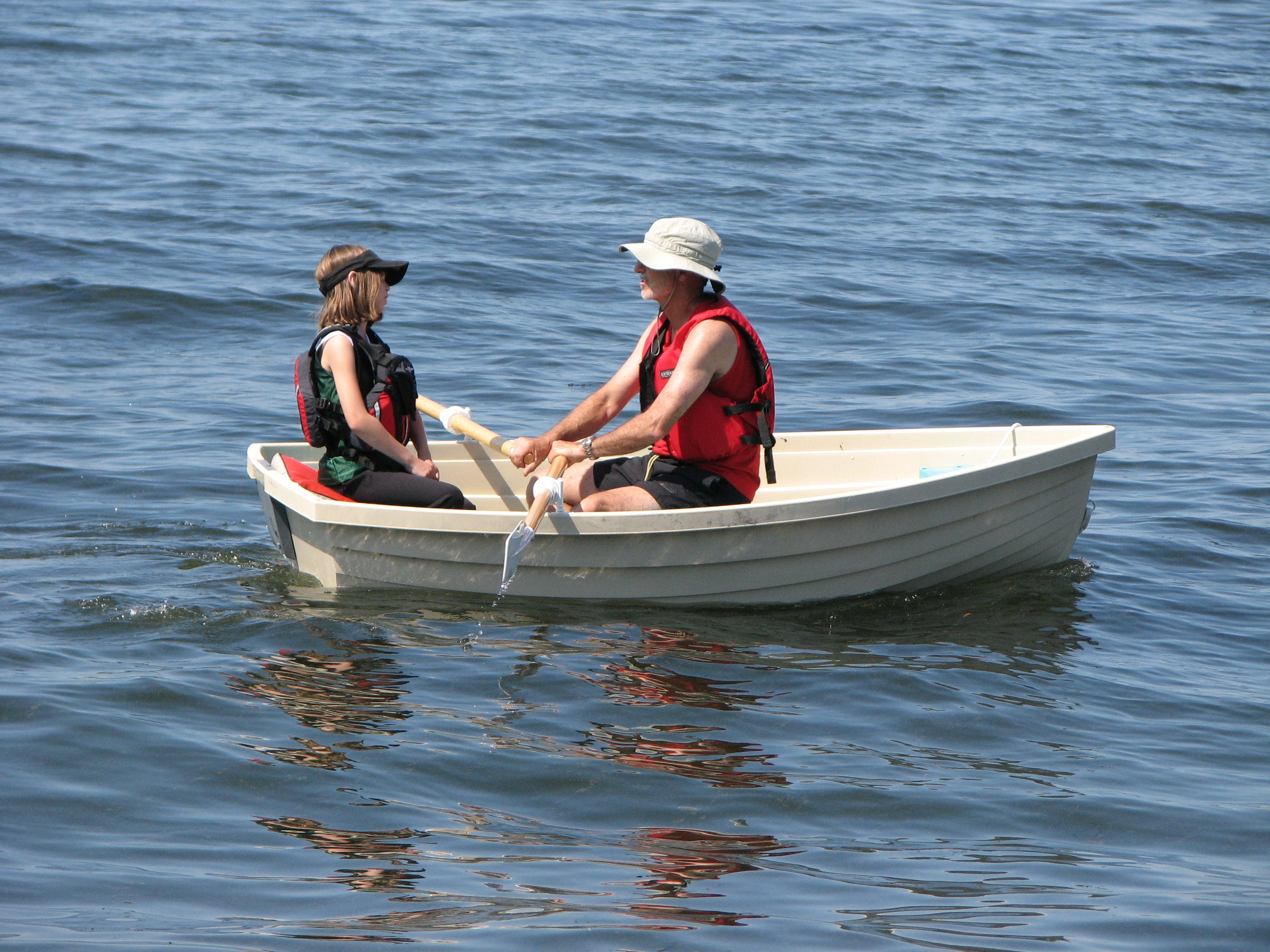
Operating a dinghy with oars

Small dinghies under 3.66 m (12 ft) are usually powered by rowing with one set of oars. Beyond 4.88 m (16 ft) it is feasible to have two or even three rowers, normally using a pair of oars. In some models, sliding thwarts allow far more powerful rowing while in others, a removable thwart can permit standing rowing. Some self-rescue dinghy/yacht tender dinghies have two sets of oarlocks (rowlocks) and an adjustable middle seat to allow for ergonomically efficient rowing positions. A single sculling oar with an oarlock on the rear transom can be a compact emergency oar. Inflatable dinghies without a rigid bottom are difficult to row more than a short distance, and are usually powered with an outboard motor, or, if necessary, paddled.

=== Motor ===
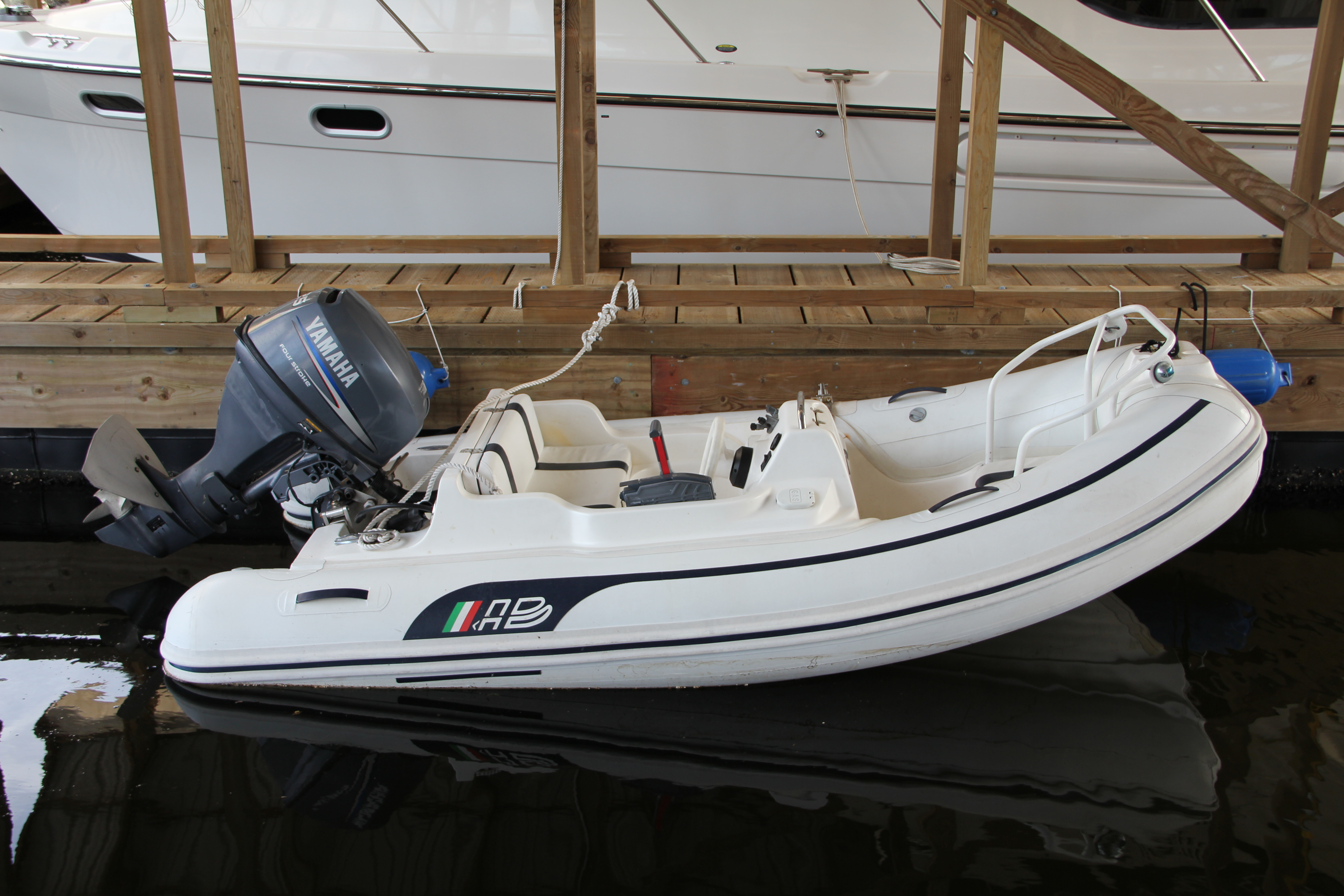
A motorized dinghy with seats and a console

Another option is an outboard motor. Two horsepower per meter can reach hull speed. Ten horsepower per metre (7.5 kW/m) will put a flat-bottomed dinghy on plane. A 3.05-metre (10 ft) dinghy with a hard V-bottom hull and a fifteen-horsepower (11 kW) outboard can reach speeds of 25 mph (40 km/h; 22 kn). The gas tank is usually placed under the rear thwart. Engines always swing up so the dinghy can be grounded without damage. Since the transom may need to be cut down for the engine to fit properly, an engine well should be used to prevent low waves from splashing over the transom and flooding the boat.

=== Sail ===
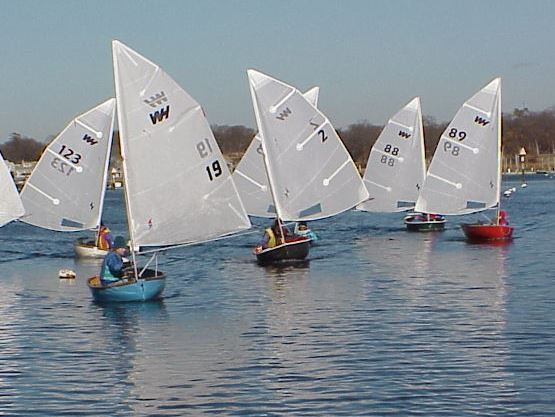
Sailing dinghies racing

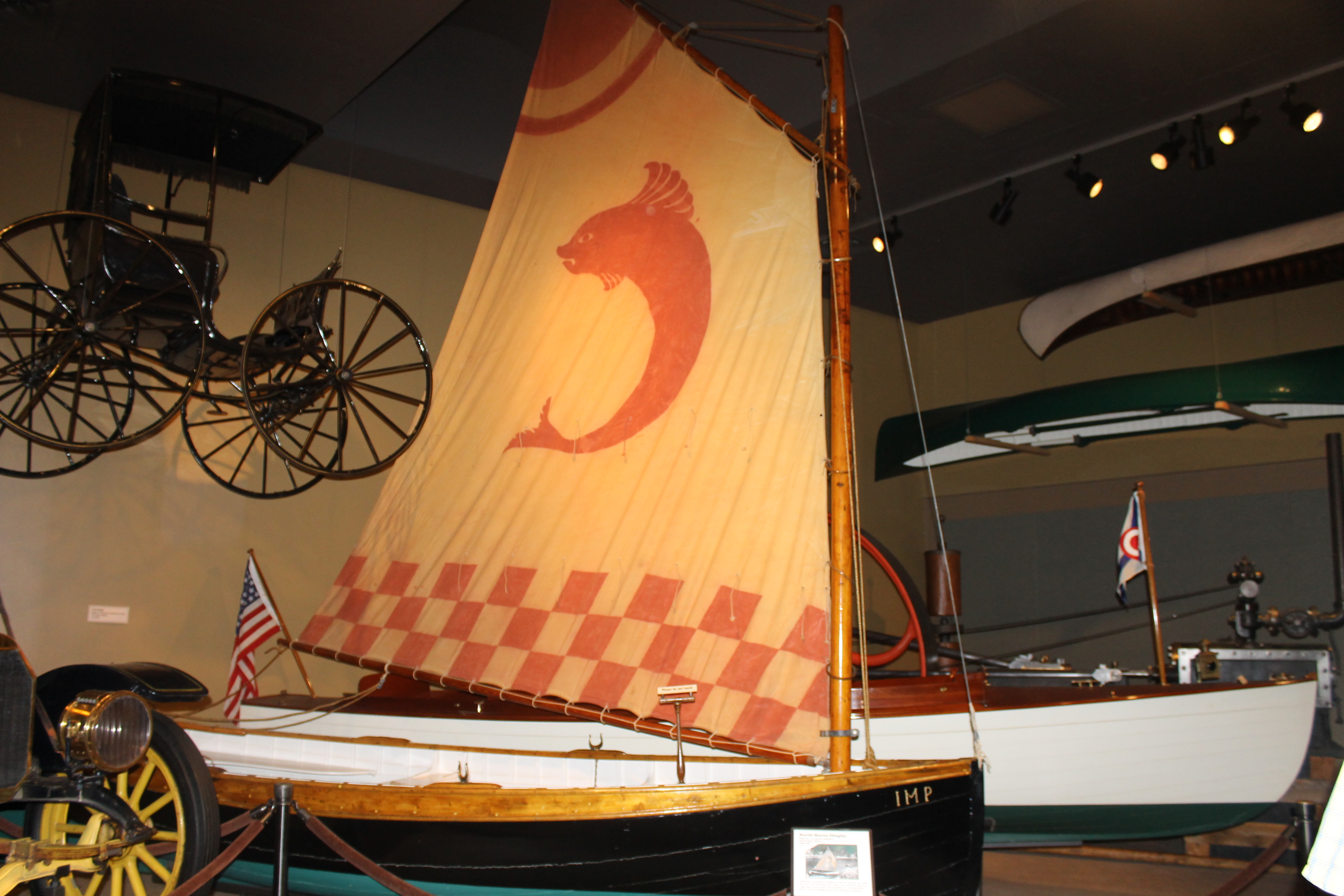
Sailing dinghy built by J. O. Brown Shipyard in North Haven, Maine, displayed at the Maine State Museum in Augusta; used in the 1880s, participated in sailing races

A typical sail choice for a dinghy is gunter rig with a shorter mast that fits within the hull when unstepped. Sprit rigs have no boom, and the advantage that the sail can be brailed up out of the way against the mast when rowing or motoring. Lug rigs are another common single sail type used in small dinghies, both standing and balanced (with some area forward of the mast), and usable with or without a boom.

Traditional working dinghies have a lee board that can be hooked over the side. This does not split the cargo space. A sailing rudder is usually tied or clipped to a simple pair of pintles (hinge pins) on the transom with the bottom pintle being longer so that the rudder can be mounted one pintle at a time. The rope keeps the rudder from floating off in a wave. Both rudders and lee boards have swiveling tips so the dinghy can be landed. Rudders are often arranged so the tiller folds against the rudder to make a compact package.

Racing dinghies usually have a daggerboard or centreboard to better sail upwind. The trunk is in the middle of what would otherwise be cargo area. A self-rescue dinghy intended to be used as a proactive lifeboat has leeboards on either side, to allow for maximum open cockpit area.

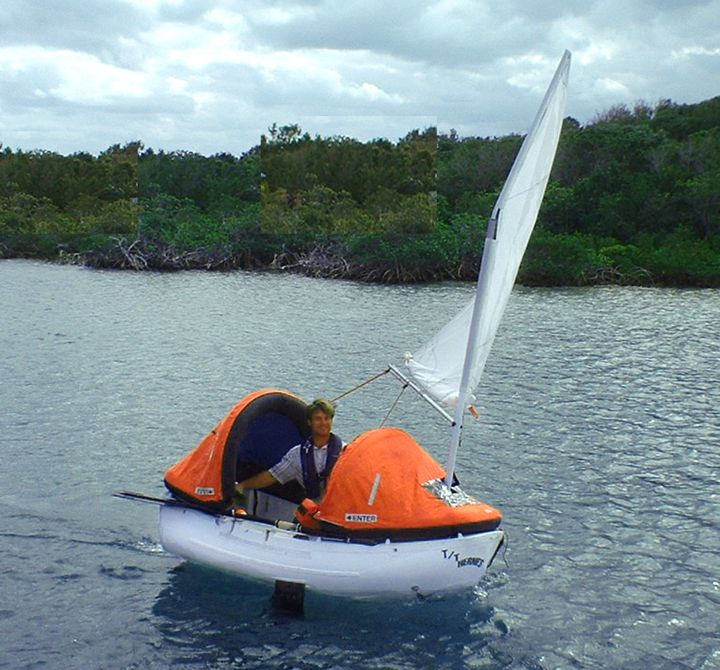
Self-rescue dinghy lifeboat, sailing. Note unzipped middle section of lifeboat canopy and reefed sail.

=== Solar ===
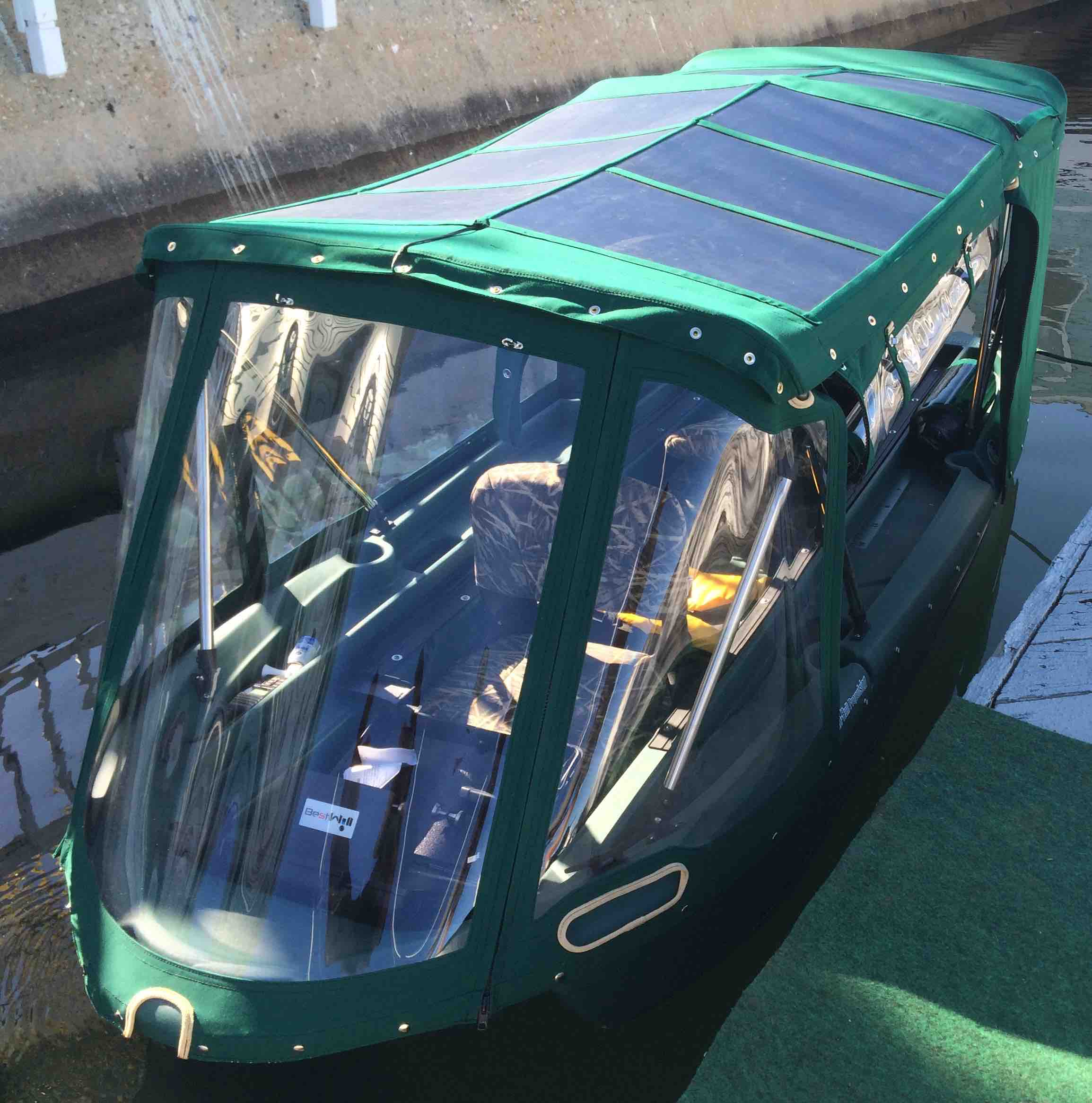
This solar dinghy was created by Leonard Holmberg. Based on Freedom Electric's X10 hull. One of the only tri-power small boats in the world, Solar, Propane, Lithium "SPL"

Solar propulsion uses hybrid flexible solar panels integrated into the bimini top supplying power to a lithium battery bank. Twin in-hull trolling motor produce 72 pounds-force (320 N) of thrust powering the solar dinghy to 3–5 knots (3.5–5.8 mph; 5.6–9.3 km/h) depending on weather conditions. Alternate power is supplied by a propane outboard for increased speed and range.

== See also ==
- Boat building
- Dinghy sailing
- Dinghy racing
- 420 (dinghy)
- Laser (dinghy)
