= The Sea Wolf (1993 film) =

1993 American-Canadian television film

- Genre: Adventure; Drama
- Based on: The Sea-Wolf by Jack London
- Screenplay by: Andrew J. Fenady
- Directed by: Michael Anderson
- Starring: Charles Bronson; Christopher Reeve
- Music by: Charles Bernstein
- Countries of origin: United States; Canada
- Original language: English

Production
- Executive producers: Bob Banner; Andrew J. Fenady
- Producers: Duke Fenady; W. Paterson Ferns
- Production location: Vancouver
- Cinematography: Glen MacPherson
- Editor: Nick Rotundo
- Running time: 90 minutes
- Production company: Turner Entertainment

Original release
- Network: TNT
- Release: April 18, 1993

The Sea Wolf is a 1993 American-Canadian made-for-television adventure drama film directed by Michael Anderson, starring Charles Bronson, Catherine Mary Stewart and Christopher Reeve. It is based on Jack London's 1904 novel The Sea-Wolf.

Writer-producer Andrew J. Fenady modeled the main antagonist, Wolf Larsen, on Charles Bronson, who was uneasy with the heavy dialogue after years of stoic action roles. Filmed in Vancouver on the 1924 schooner Zodiac with sets designed to mimic the sea’s motion, director Michael Anderson praised its focus on character over special effects. Christopher Reeve, playing the protagonist Van Weyden, valued the story’s allegorical themes and avoided past adaptations, instead portraying Van Weyden as a snob transformed by survival, and noted that Bronson’s rigid preparation and discomfort with dialogue shaped the on-set dynamic, where Reeve aimed to stay adaptable and reactive.

Reviews of The Sea Wolf were mixed. Bronson was noted for his commanding portrayal of Wolf Larsen and Reeve for stepping outside his Superman image, while some critics described the acting as flat and the story as dated. The cinematography, score, and set design received consistent praise, though opinions varied on whether the leads were miscast or brought depth to their roles.

== Plot ==
Jack London's brutal antihero Wolf Larson brings a shipwrecked aristocrat and a con woman aboard his doomed ship, the seal-hunter Ghost.

== Cast ==
- Charles Bronson as Captain Wolf Larsen
- Christopher Reeve as Humphrey Van Weyden
- Catherine Mary Stewart as Flaxen Brewster
- Marc Singer as Johnson
- Len Cariou as Dr. Picard
- Clive Revill as Thomas C. "Cookie" Mugridge
- Shane Kelly as Leach
- Garry Chalk as Chandler / First Mate
- Tom McBeath as Latimer
- Stan Barrett as Ofty Ofty
- Dee Jay Jackson as Smoke
- Eli Gabay as Dogbreath, Helmsman
- Russell J. Roberts as French Frank
- Bill Croft as Donovan
- John Novak as Jameson Damisk

== Production ==
According to writer-producer Andrew J. Fenady, when he wrote the screenplay, Charles Bronson was the prototype of the main antagonist Wolf Larsen. Bronson, known as an action film leading man, worked for Fenady prior, acting against type in the television film Yes, Virginia, there is a Santa Claus (1991).

About playing the main villain, Charles Bronson had reservations and said "I was a little worried about all of the dialogue. I don't usually do that much talking in movies. And this is a bad guy. A really bad guy."

Fenady wanted to film the project on a real boat, that looked like something of the period in which the story takes place and could accommodate a film crew. He explained that since the shoot was located in Vancouver, he called every boat broker in the West Coast and eventually they found a 120 foot schooner, named "Zodiac", that was built in 1924 with a 19th century design.

Director Michael Anderson explained that he accepted the opportunity to direct The Sea Wolf immediately after it was offered to him. He said that "in a day when special effects seem to overshadow all of filmmaking, the richness and depth of character and visual excitement of this project is a great joy to undertake. And the fact that we shot everything but a half-day at sea is great for the actors and crew, which is great for the film and its audience."

On a sound stage in a Vancouver port, designer Trevor Williams built five below decks cabins and a water tank, that were engineered on rollers to give the effect of the "sway of the sea."

Christopher Reeve said he chose the film for two reasons. The first one is that the script captured very well "the allegorical battle between Van Weyden and Larsen, which reflects the enlightenment and darkness of men". The second one was that he thought that Vancouver, the filming location, was a great place to be with his family.

Reeve said he chose not to look at previous adaptions of the book, finding it more rewarding to base his interpretation on the current script rather than on previous performances. He said he played Van Weyden "not as a dandy but as a snob who is decent at heart; who goes through a humanizing process to survive, and whose primitive instinct is brought to the fore. I played each scene as if he were accepting his plight as a positive learning experience. That attitude became the litmus test for the character."

Reeve said that Bronson was daunted by the amount of dialogue he had and explained "he's used to playing characters who don't talk much. He came to the set with every move already worked out—not a lot of flexibility. Frankly, I tried to be invisible around him as much as possible. I wanted to be part of the solution and not part of the problem. I took the attitude that I was a reactor cast adrift in the new world. A fish out of water with no controls of the events."

== Reception ==
Ray Loynd of the Los Angeles Times "the production rivals the classic Edward G. Robinson remake (Warner Bros., 1942), generally cited as the strongest of all six prior "Sea Wolf" movies (including three silents). ... Bronson, playing what's probably his first thinking man's heavy, seems right at home as the power-maddened Wolf Larsen butting heads and spouting lines from Milton ("It's better to reign in hell than to serve in heaven"). But it's Reeve's character, compelled to claw his way out of the galley as the spat-upon cabin boy, who does all the changing in this sea-tossed crucible of fire."

Mark Dawidziak, in his review published in the Calgary Herald, said that he found the acting of leads flat. Also that the film was corny but entertaining.

Tony Scott of Variety did not like it saying that it is a "barnacled story suffers from miscasting, loose direction and archaic dialogue; the meller founders." However he praised the cinematography, the score, the editing, the effects, the set, and costume design.

Dave Jewett of The Columbian thought that Bronson did a good job acting but that it was difficult to watch Reeve play a weak character due to the fact his most well known role is Superman. He also explained that the high sea scenery serves the film well.

Ron Miller in his Richmond Times-Dispatch review said it was interesting to watch Reeve and Bronson break out of their usual typecast. He explained he found them to be good as well as the rest of the cast. Furthermore, he liked the photography.

Tom Jicha of the Sun Sentinel praised the actors, especially Bronson, and said that it "is a riveting tale that draws you into both its narrative and setting."

== Accolades ==
Composer Charles Bernstein was nominated for Outstanding Music Composition for a Miniseries, Movie, or a Special at the 45th Primetime Emmy Awards.
