= Zodiac (schooner) =

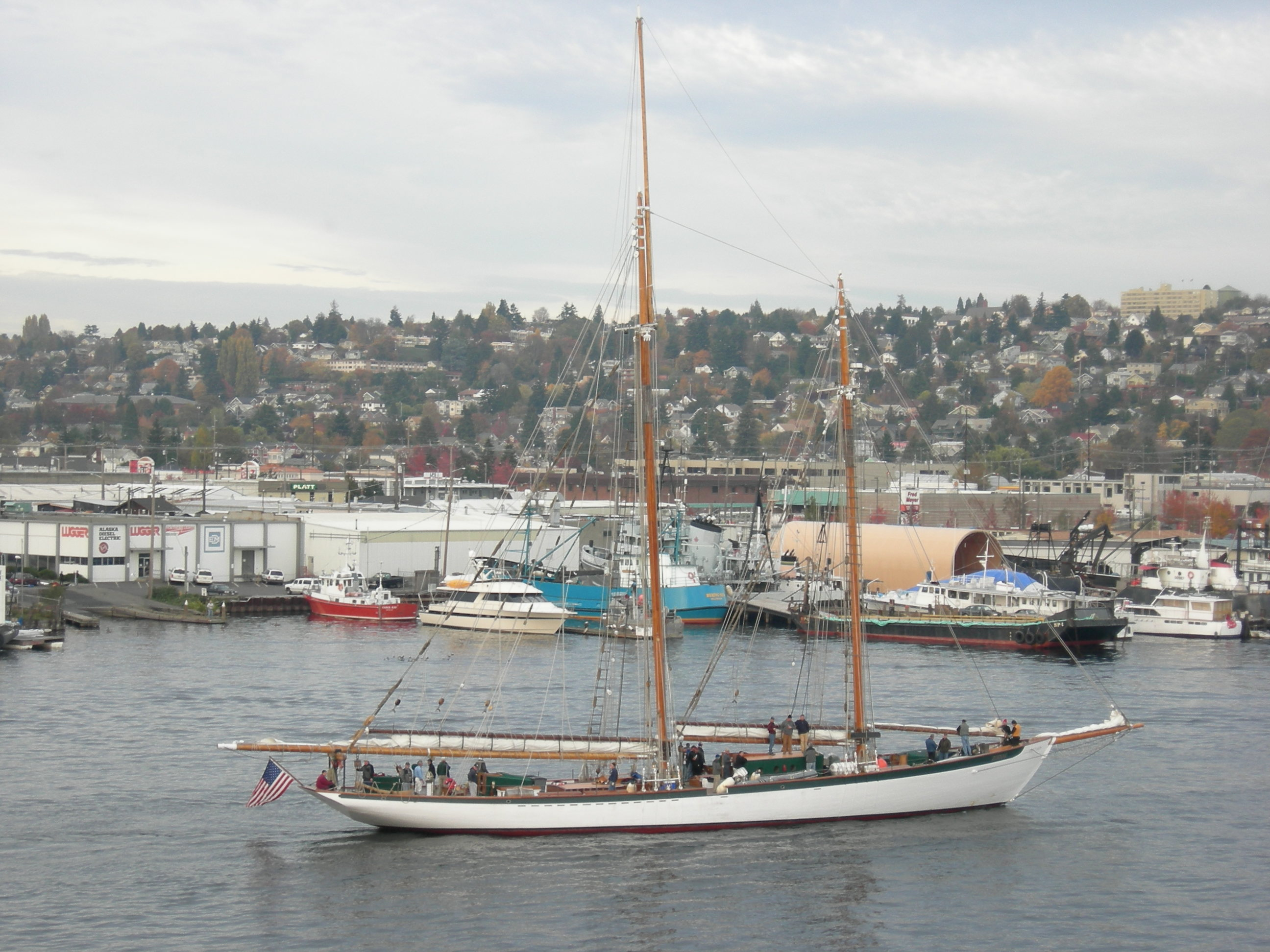
- Zodiac motoring east along the Lake Washington Ship Canal, just east of the Ballard Bridge, Seattle, Washington

History

United States
- Name: Zodiac (1924–1931); California (1931–1973); Airdene; Zodiac
- Owner: RW & JS Johnson; San Francisco Bar Pilots Association (1931–1973)
- Builder: Hodgdon Brothers
- Launched: 1924
- Identification: IMO number: 7937587; MMSI number: 366968070; Callsign: WTH5653
- Status: Historic landmark

General characteristics
- Tonnage: 145 tons (gross) 89 (net)
- Displacement: 220 tons
- Length: 160 ft (49 m) (LOA) 127 ft (39 m) (on deck)
- Beam: 25.2 ft (7.7 m)
- Draft: 15 ft (4.6 m)
- Depth of hold: 11.5 ft (3.5 m)
- Propulsion: Caterpillar 400 hp (300 kW) diesel
- Sail plan: Gaff-rigged topsail schooner 7,000 sq ft (650 m^{2})
- Speed: 13.4 knots (24.8 km/h; 15.4 mph) (max), 9 knots (17 km/h; 10 mph) (powered)
- Zodiac (schooner)
- U.S. National Register of Historic Places
- Location within Washington (state)
- Location: Bellingham, WA
- Coordinates: 48°43′19.4″N 122°30′47.7″W
- Built: 1924
- Architect: William Hand, Jr.
- NRHP reference No.: 82004248
- Added to NRHP: 29 April 1982

Zodiac is a two-masted schooner designed by William H. Hand Jr. for Robert Wood Johnson and J. Seward Johnson, heirs to the Johnson & Johnson pharmaceuticals fortune. Hand intended to epitomize the best features of the American fishing schooner. The 160-foot-long (49 m) (sparred length; 127 feet (39 m) on deck), 145-ton vessel competed in transatlantic races. In 1931 the vessel was purchased by the San Francisco Bar Pilots Association, brought from the Atlantic, modified and placed in service as the pilot vessel California serving as such until retired in 1972.

== Design and construction ==
The schooner was the largest vessel designed by William H. Hand Jr., a renowned naval architect, who was a primary developer of the V-bottomed hull motorsailers. Zodiac was built in 1924 at the Hodgdon Brothers Shipyard, East Boothbay, Maine.

As built the vessel was 126 feet 10 inches (38.7 m) length overall, 25 feet 2 inches (7.7 m) beam, design draft of 13 feet 11 inches (4.2 m) and a waterline length of 98 feet 6 inches (30.0 m) on design draft. Propulsion was by an Atlas 140 horsepower (100 kW), six-cylinder, four-cycle engine driving a 54 inches (1.4 m), two-bladed propeller for a speed of about 7.5 knots (13.9 km/h; 8.6 mph) under power.

== Yacht ==
Robert Wood and J. Seward Johnson sailed the yacht as far north as Nachvak, Labrador and in 1928 entered Zodiac in a race from New York to Spain with the yacht finishing fourth among the large yachts.

== Pilot vessel California ==
The San Francisco Bar Pilots Association bought the schooner in 1931 on the Atlantic Coast and brought the vessel to San Francisco for modification and operation as the pilot vessel California bearing the name of an earlier vessel of the Association. The vessel was the largest schooner operated by the San Francisco Bar Pilots who operated her in peacetime and through wars until 1972 as the last sailing vessel in the United States to serve as a pilot vessel.

=== Modification ===
As a pilot boat is required to be on station during all weather and, in the case of the San Francisco Bar Pilots of the time, remain on station for about five days supporting a crew of seven hosting up to ten pilots, modification was required. The Association had the vessel modified by The Moore Dry Dock Company of Oakland, after consultation with the original designer, increased power with a 275-horsepower (205 kW) Atlas-Imperial diesel engine to replace the original Atlas 140 hp (100 kW) diesel engine that in turn required modifications to the stern to accommodate a larger shaft and 65-inch (1.7 m) diameter propeller with 59-inch (1,500 mm) pitch replacing the original 54-inch (1.4 m) diameter, 2-bladed propeller. (Note: The National Register of Historic Places Inventory—Nomination Form notes a different propulsion plant and may reflect a later modification.) The propulsion change increased speed from approximately 7.5 to 9.73 knots (13.89 to 18.02 km/h; 8.63 to 11.20 mph). Deck houses and accommodations were renovated to fit the needs of pilots serving long waits on station with a pilot house added that was unusual for a yacht and resembling that of a commercial vessel. The galley had a single oil burner range and accommodations were heated by a steam heat system based on an Areola boiler. Modifications resulted in an increase in draft from the original designed 13 feet 11 inches (4.2 m) to 14 feet 11 inches (4.5 m) with a new waterline length of 103 feet (31.4 m) and displacement increasing from 210 to 245 tons.

=== Pilot service ===
California was delivered and on station in early 1932 serving as one of the pilot boats, rotating duty on the bar at five-day intervals. The other active pilot vessel was Gracie S. with Adventuress serving as backup vessel. The offshore pilot vessel station was approximately nine miles off the Golden Gate. Operating in close proximity with large ships had its risks with California losing her bow three times and once being grounded in San Francisco Bay.

California was retired in 1972 to be replaced by pure motorized vessels, including a more modern vessel built in 2000. This made her one of the last three sail-powered pilot vessels in the United States, along with the Boston-based schooner Roseway, which was retired sometime between 1971 and 1973, and Adventuress, also once a San Francisco pilot boat, which was retired in 1952, and is also a registered National Historic Landmark.

== Sale and return to Zodiac ==
California was sold in 1973 returning to the name Zodiac and, in the late 1970s, the private Vessel Zodiac Corporation was formed to operate and maintain her. She was professionally restored, and her rig, which had been altered during her time as a pilot boat, was returned to its original configuration. Zodiac now operates charters and cruises in Washington state's San Juan Islands and British Columbia's Gulf Islands. The not-for-profit Northwest Schooner Society partners with the corporation to provide sail training programs for youth and adults.

== Use in film ==
The Zodiac was used as the main location for Michael Anderson's made-for-television adventure drama film The Sea Wolf (1993), starring Charles Bronson, and Christopher Reeve. It is based on Jack London's novel The Sea-Wolf.

== See also ==
- Historic preservation
- National Register of Historic Places
- List of schooners
