= San Francisco Bar Pilots Association =

San Francisco Bar Pilots Association is the official maritime pilot group for the San Francisco harbor and associated waterways. The pilots in the group are licensed and regulated by California Board of Pilot Commissioners. The Association was created in 1850 and is a member of the American Pilots Association. The association is the oldest purely maritime organization on the Pacific coast of the United States predating the oldest lighthouse in California erected on Alcatraz Island in 1854. The "bar" referred to in their name is a large sandbar in the Pacific Ocean just outside of the Golden Gate which poses a significant hazard to arriving ships. The pilots were required by law to maintain a constant round the clock watch with enough pilots aboard a pilot boat on the bar to pilot any arriving ship safely into port.

In 1910 the 58 feet 2 inches (17.7 m) motor boat California was built for the pilots. In 1935 three schooner pilot vessels were maintained to provide rotating five-day watches on the bar near the lightship with two, the large schooner California and Gracie S. being regulars with Adventuress as reserve. At that time the pilot vessels were crewed by seven men hosting up to ten pilots awaiting ships with a rule that at sunset enough should be aboard to pilot all vessels expected before noon of the next day.

Today the Bar Pilots are responsible for piloting ships into nine ports within San Francisco Bay as far as the Ports of Stockton and Sacramento and the Port of Monterey outside the bay.

== See also ==
- Zodiac (schooner)
- Adventuress (schooner)
- USS California (SP-647)
