= USS California (SP-647) =

Patrol vessel of the United States Navy

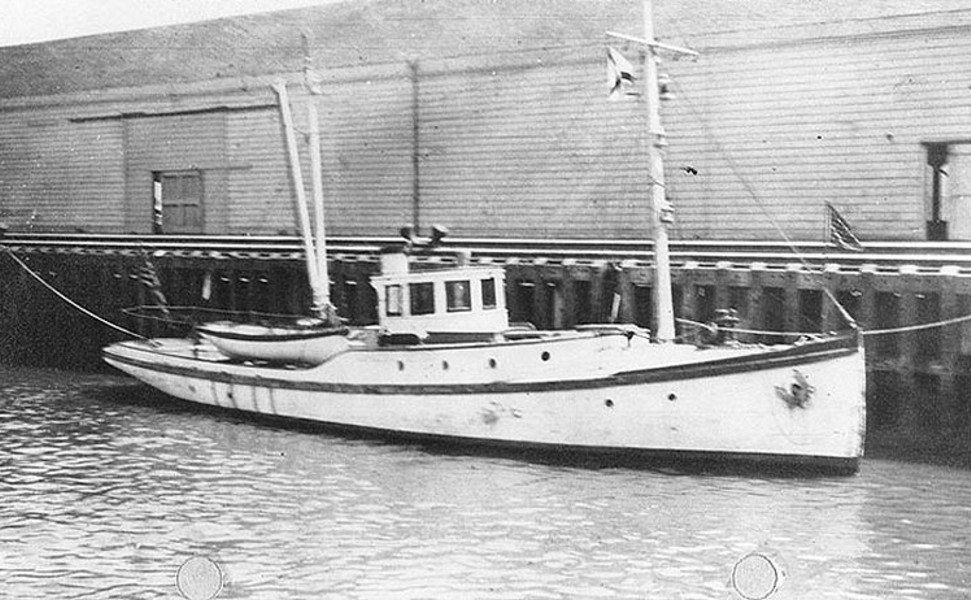
- California (American Motor Boat, 1910) in port, probably at San Francisco, California, prior to her World War I era Naval service.

History

United States
- Name: USS California
- Namesake: California, which was admitted to the Union 8 September 1850 as the 31st State
- Owner: the San Francisco Bar Pilots Association
- Laid down: date unknown
- Completed: in 1910 at San Francisco, California
- Acquired: leased by the Navy in the spring of 1917
- Commissioned: 28 April 1917
- Decommissioned: 23 November 1918
- Renamed: USS SP-647
- Stricken: 23 November 1918 (est.)
- Home port: San Francisco, California
- Fate: Returned to the San Francisco Bar Pilots Association in November 1918

General characteristics
- Type: Motorboat
- Displacement: not known
- Length: 58 ft 2 in (17.73 m)
- Beam: not known
- Draft: not known
- Propulsion: not known
- Complement: not known
- Armament: not known

USS California (SP-647) – later known as USS SP-647 – was originally a motorboat used by the San Francisco Bar Pilots Association as a pilot boat. She was leased by the Navy, and outfitted as an armed section patrol craft, assigned to patrol and protect San Francisco harbor. At war's end, she was returned to the pilot's association.

== A California pilot boat ==
California, a 58' 2" motorboat, was built in 1910 at San Francisco, California, for local employment as a pilot boat. She was leased from the San Francisco Bar Pilot's Association and commissioned in the Navy as USS California (SP-647) on 28 April 1917.

== World War I service ==
The fourth ship to be so named by the U.S. Navy, California (No. 647), served Section Patrol duties during the war. Later renamed USS SP-647, the motor boat performed harbor patrol duties and acted as guard boat for Pier 29 at San Francisco until 23 November 1918

== Decommissioning ==
California (No. 647) was returned to the San Francisco Bar Pilot's Association on 23 November 1918.

== Additional photos ==
The San Francisco Maritime Museum, located in the San Francisco Maritime National Historical Park, holds additional photographs of the pilot boat California in its Livingston Collection.

== See also ==
- California (schooner) (San Francisco Bar Pilots Association pilot boat 1931–1972)
