= Roseway =

1925 schooner

Coordinates: 42°21′18″N 71°02′38″W

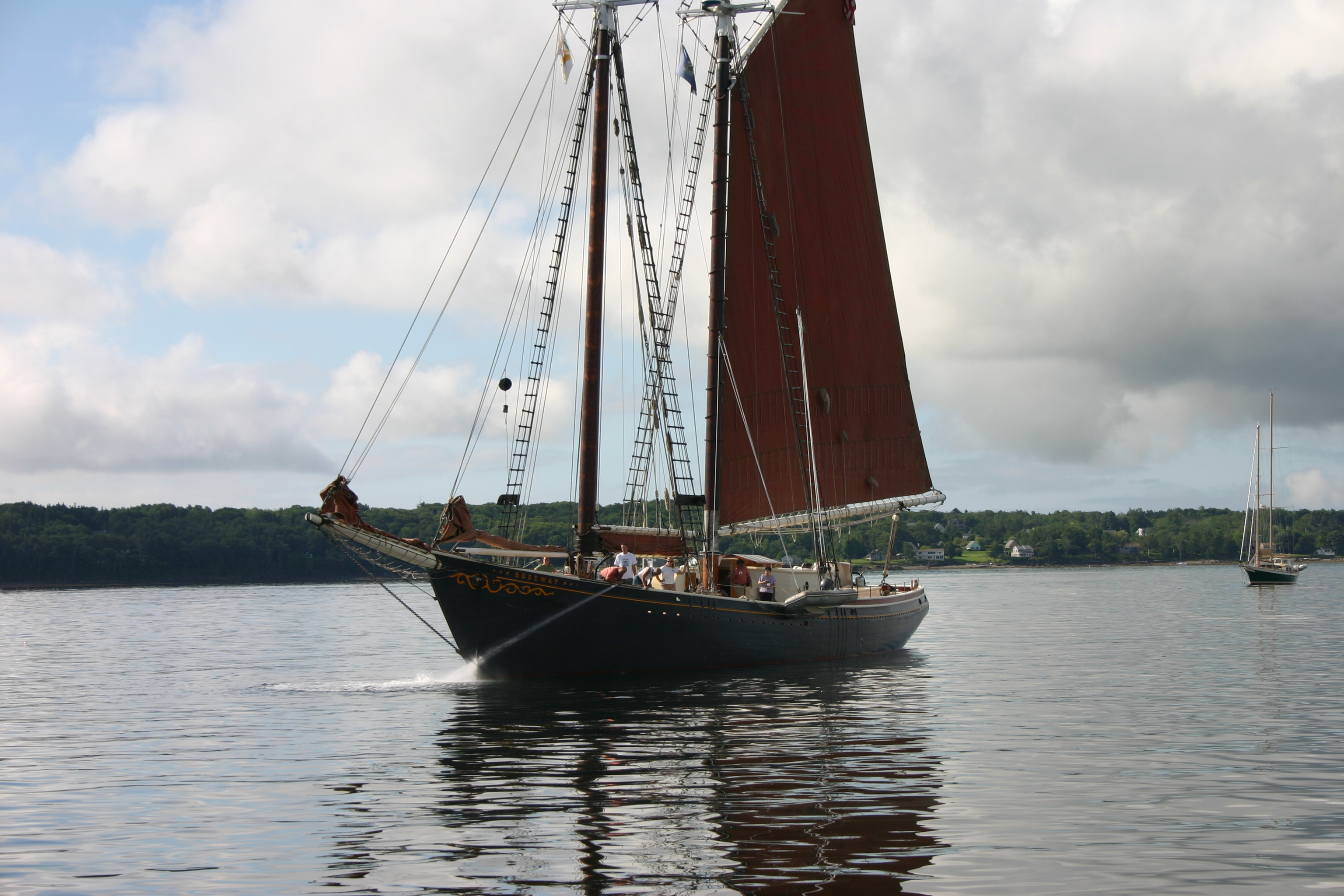
- Roseway under partial sail

History
- Name: Roseway
- Owner: Harold Hathaway (1925–1941); Boston Pilots (1941–1942); Coast Guard Reserve (1942–1945); Boston Pilots (1945–1972); A Boston syndicate (1972–1974); Jim Sharp, Orvil Young (1974–1987); World Ocean School (2002–2026); Life Systems Family Foundation (2026–Present)
- Operator: Life Systems Family Foundation
- Builder: John F. James & Son
- Launched: 24 November 1925
- Home port: Boston, MA and Christiansted, St Croix, USVI
- Identification: MMSI number: 366866000; Callsign: WDB8858
- Name: CGR-812
- Acquired: May 1942
- Fate: Returned to Boston Pilots November 1945

General characteristics
- Length: 137 ft (42 m) LOA; 112 ft (34 m) on deck; 90 ft (27 m) LWL
- Beam: 25 ft (7.6 m)
- Draft: 13 ft (4.0 m)
- Propulsion: Sail, 400 hp (300 kW) diesel engine
- Sail plan: Gaff-rigged schooner, 5,600 sq ft (520 m^{2}) total sail
- Notes: Hull material: Wood (white oak, native pine, Douglas fir)
- Roseway
- U.S. National Register of Historic Places
- U.S. National Historic Landmark
- Location: Seasonally Boston, Massachusetts or St. Croix, USVI
- Built: 1925
- Architect: John F. James & Son
- Architectural style: Gaff-rigged wooden schooner
- NRHP reference No.: 97001278

Significant dates
- Added to NRHP: 25 September 1997
- Designated NHL: 25 September 1997

Roseway is a wooden gaff-rigged schooner launched on 24 November 1925 in Essex, Massachusetts. She is currently operated by Life Systems Family Foundation, a Canadian foundation focusing on whale research. She was designated a National Historic Landmark in 1997 as the only known surviving example of a fishing schooner built specifically with racing competition as an objective. In 1941, Roseway was purchased by the Boston Pilot's Association to serve as a pilot boat for Boston Harbor, as a replacement for the pilot-boat Northern Light, which was sold to the United States Army for war service.

== History ==
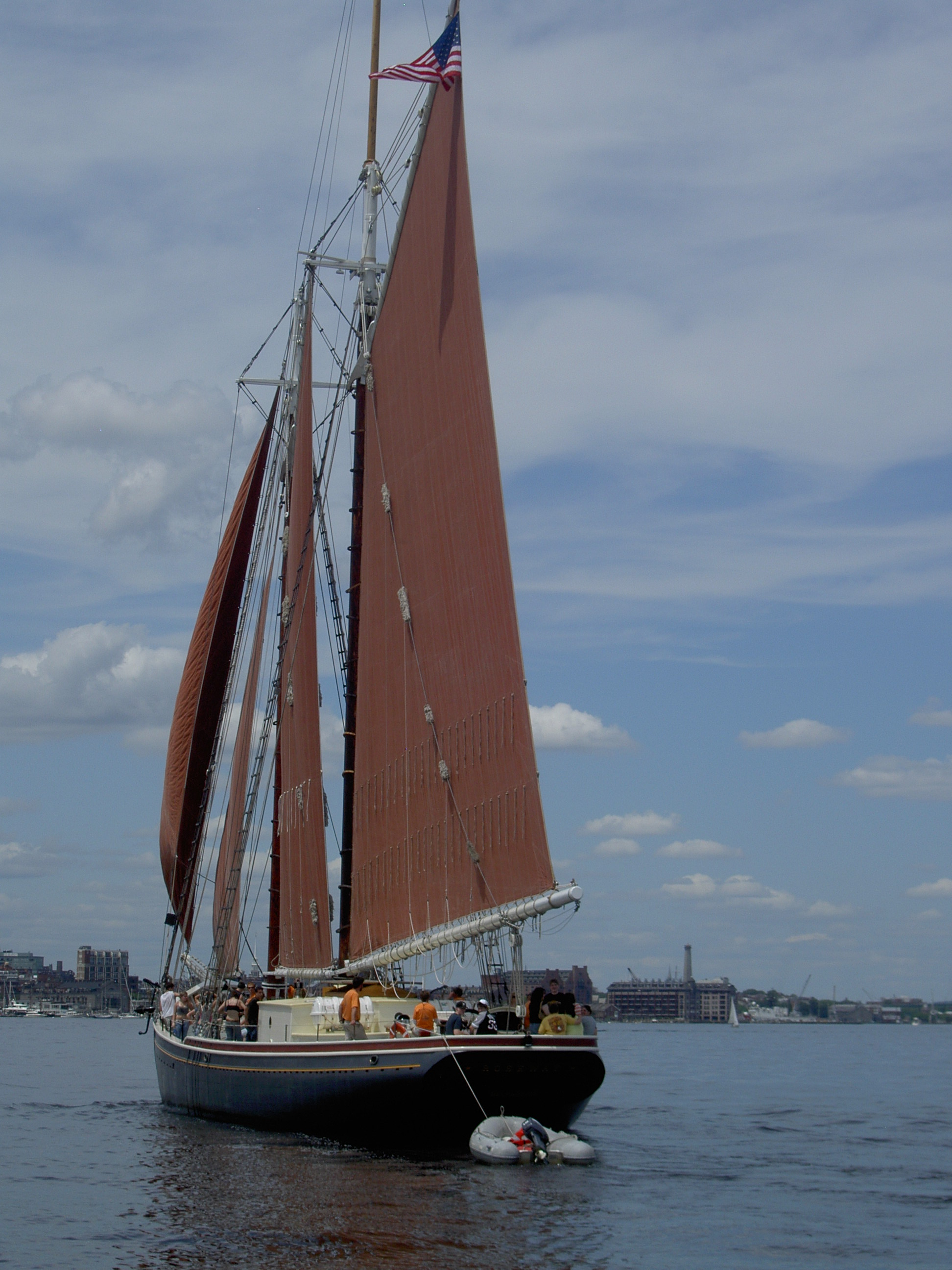
Roseway in Boston Harbor, 2006

Roseway was built in 1925 for Harold Hathaway of Taunton, Massachusetts at the John F. James & Son shipyard in Essex. Hathaway's intention was to build a boat that might beat the Canadians in the international fisherman's races popular at that time; to that end, Roseway was impeccably maintained and used only occasionally as a fishing boat.

Roseway sank at Wolfville, Nova Scotia, Canada, on 14 September 1926, but she was raised and repaired.

In 1941, Roseway was purchased by the Boston Pilot's Association to serve as a pilot boat for Boston Harbor, as a replacement for the pilot-boat Northern Light, No. 3, which was sold to the United States Army for war service. Following the attack on Pearl Harbor later that year, mines and anti-submarine netting were installed to protect the Port of Boston, and all lighted navigational aids were extinguished. Roseway was fitted with a .50 caliber machine gun for service with the Coast Guard Reserve as patrol vessel as CGR-812. She continued her piloting duties in this challenging environment, for which service her pilots were awarded a bronze plaque from the Coast Guard at the end of the war.

Roseway continued to serve as a pilot vessel until the early 1970s, at which point she and San Francisco's Zodiac were the only pilot schooners still in service in the United States. She was then sold and converted into a passenger vessel for the tourist trade. Roseway changed hands several times in the ensuing decades, operating primarily out of Camden, Maine and the US Virgin Islands. In 1997, she was listed as a National Historic Landmark. Roseway, at that time, retained between eighty and ninety percent of her original hull fabric and was badly in need of repairs. In 1998 she took one group of Hurricane Island Outward Bound School students aboard, and sailed from Hurricane Island, ME to Gloucester, MA and back, as a trial for potentially becoming part of the sailing program, which never came to fruition, and then she remained docked in Rockland, Maine until she was repossessed by the First National Bank of Damariscotta, which in 2002 donated the vessel to the newly founded World Ocean School.

Following two years of restoration in Boothbay Harbor, Roseway again set sail in 2005. She served as the flagship for the World Ocean School, which offers various educational programs in St. Croix and the northeastern United States until 2022. In 2026, World Ocean School transferred ownership to Life Systems Family Foundation, a Canadian foundation that plans to use Roseway for whale research.

== See also ==
- List of National Historic Landmarks in Boston
- National Register of Historic Places listings in northern Boston, Massachusetts
- History of Full Rigged Ships
- List of schooners
