= Adventuress (schooner) =

1913 schooner

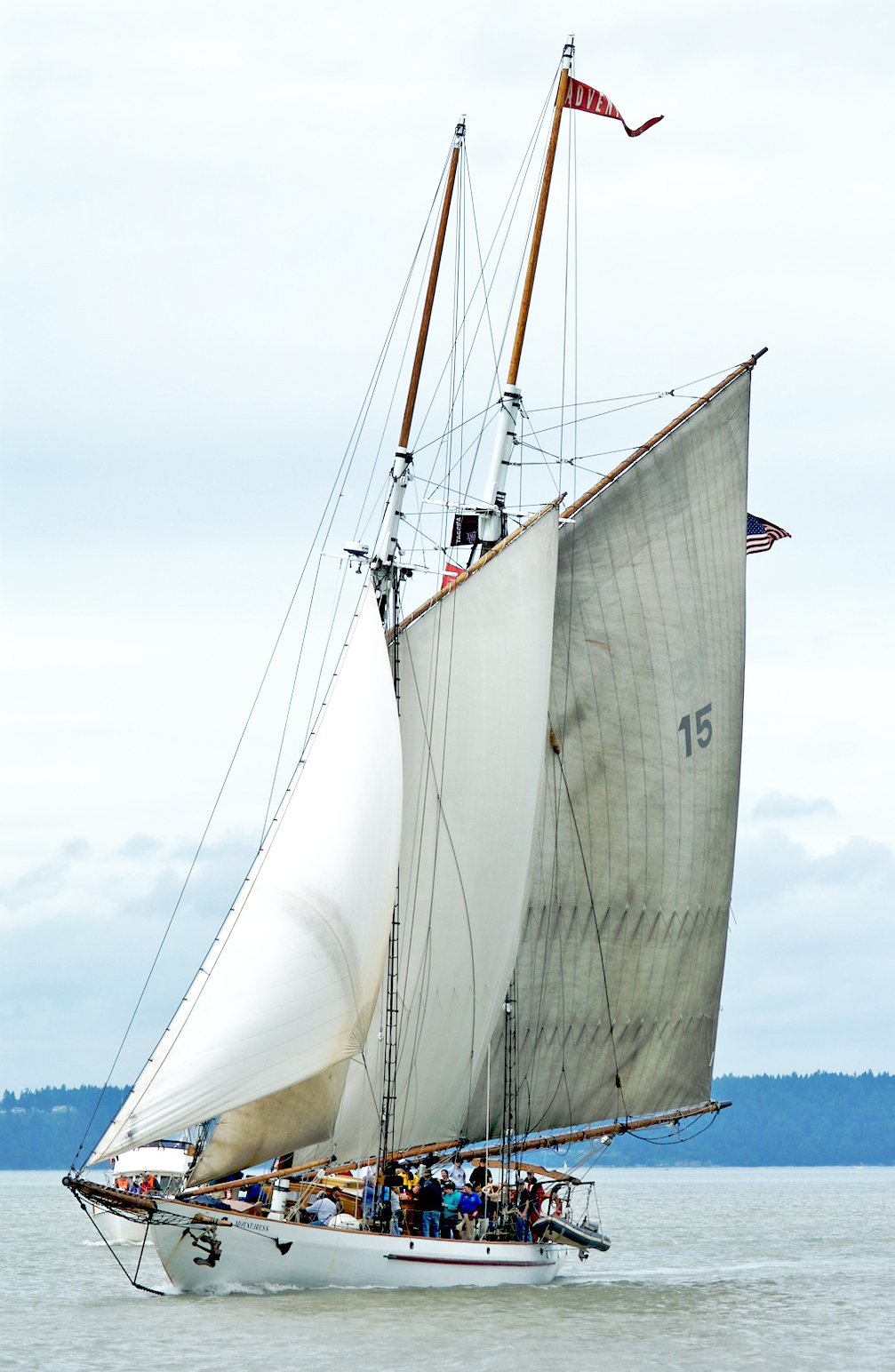
- Adventuress Participating in the 2008 Tacoma Tall Ships Festival.

History

United States
- Name: Adventuress
- Builder: Rice Brothers
- Launched: 1913
- Home port: Port Townsend, WA
- Identification: MMSI number: 367323180; Callsign: WCX8691
- Nickname(s): "The A"

General characteristics
- Type: Schooner
- Displacement: 115 tons
- Length: 133 ft (41 m)
- Beam: 21 ft (6.4 m)
- Height: 110 ft (34 m)
- Draft: 12 ft (3.7 m)
- Propulsion: 5,478 sq ft (508.9 m^{2}) of Sail & auxiliary diesel engine
- Sail plan: Gaff–rigged
- Boats & landing craft carried: A-ya’-she (Sid Skiff) , W’ha-lé ( Achilles inflatable, 20 hp Yamaha) Hobbes (former inflatable), Jefé (former inflatable
- Adventuress (Schooner)
- U.S. National Register of Historic Places
- U.S. National Historic Landmark
- Location: Seattle, Washington
- Built: 1913
- Architects: Bowdoin B. Crowninshield; Rice Brothers
- NRHP reference No.: 89001067

Significant dates
- Added to NRHP: April 11, 1989
- Designated NHL: April 11, 1989

Adventuress is a 133-foot (41 m) gaff-rigged schooner launched in 1913 in East Boothbay, Maine. She has since been restored, and is listed as a National Historic Landmark. She is one of two surviving San Francisco bar pilot schooners.

Adventuress is currently operated by Sound Experience, a non-profit organization based in Port Townsend, Washington.

== Smallboats ==
Adventuress carries two smallboats in davits aft of her main shrouds.

Her current rescue boat/ pushboat is an Achilles hypalon inflatable named W’ha-lé, equipped with an 20hp Yamaha outboard named Porpoise. She is carried in the port davits. W’ha-lé was stolen from Adventuress in her first months of service in 2022 but was quickly recovered.

In her starboard davits Adventuress carries a 1979 Sid Skiff built by Ray Speck in Sausalito. Her name is A-ya’-she. A-ya’-she was the 2023 Port Townsend Wooden Boat Festival Short Course-Fixed Seat Rowing race champion. Her name means “Little One” in Chippewa/Ojibwe. The boat also participated in the 2024 Port Townsend Wooden Boat Festival “Row Row Row My Boat” event.

Adventuress’ former rescue boats were named Hobbes (outboard: Calvin) and Jefé (outboard: Fast Eddie).

== History ==
Adventuress was built for John Borden at the Rice Brothers' yard in East Boothbay, Maine, and was designed by B.B. Crowninshield. Borden intended to sail to Alaska to go hunting for sport with his friends. After Adventuress sailed to Bermuda, the voyage’s mission expanded to take a bowhead whale for the American Museum of Natural History in New York. Aboard this maiden voyage sailed the naturalist Roy Chapman Andrews. During the voyage, Chapman stopped on the Pribilof Islands and captured film of fur seals, which led to efforts to protect their colonies. Borden's efforts to catch a whale failed and he sold Adventuress to the San Francisco Bar Pilots Association, which marked the beginning of her career as a workboat. For 35 years, she transferred pilots to and from vessels near the San Francisco Bar. During World War II, she was a United States Coast Guard vessel, performing pilotage duties in San Francisco Bay.

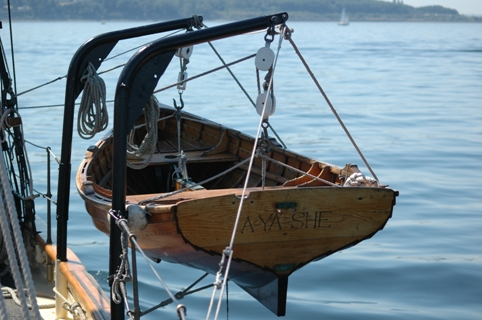
Adventuress' dinghy A-ya’-she

Around 1952, Adventuress was brought to Seattle where she went through several owners. In 1959 A.W. (Monty) Morton bought the ship. Through his non-profit, Youth Adventure, Inc, Monty Morton and Co-Captain Karl Mehrer began a sail training program for teen girls and boys. During this period Captain Mehrer, his son Tim Mehrer, and a crew of volunteers began a complete renovation including the installation of four watertight bulkheads that led to the ship’s 1975 Coast Guard Certification. In 1974 Ernestine Bennett became President of the Youth Adventure, Inc. Ernestine Bennett and Captain Mehrer continued the sail training program for an additional 15 years. In 1988, Sound Experience began conducting educational programs on the vessel, and the following year she was listed as a National Historic Landmark.

== Sound Experience ==
Today Adventuress is operated by the non-profit organization Sound Experience, as a platform for environmental education about Puget Sound. She sails from March into October, on trips ranging from 3 hours to 7 days. Paid employees and volunteers perform office, crew, and maintenance work.

== See also ==
- Historic preservation
- National Historic Landmark
- List of schooners
