= Steers (surname) =

Steers is a surname. Notable people with the surname include:

- Alfred E. Steers (1860–1948), American city magistrate and politician
- Barry Steers (1927–2011), Canadian diplomat
- Burr Steers (born 1965), American actor
- Edward Steers, Jr., American historian
- Edwin K. Steers (1915-1992), American politician
- George Steers (1815–1856), American yacht designer
- Henry Steers, American shipbuilder
- Henry Steers (1832) (1832–1903), American shipbuilder
- Hugh Auchincloss Steers (1963–1995), American painter
- James Alfred Steers (1899–1987), British geographer and author
- James Rich Steers (1808–1896), American yacht builder
- Larry Steers (1888–1951), American actor
- Newton Steers (1917–1993), American Republican politician
- Thomas S. Steers (1804–1884), American police officer
- Thomas Steers (1672–1750), English civil engineer
- William D. Steers (born 1955), American urologist

== See also ==
- Steers (disambiguation)
