= Steer (surname) =

Steer is a surname. Notable people with the surname include:

- Bartholomew Steer (bap. 1568–1597), English rebel
- Bill Steer (born 1969), British guitarist
- Dugald Steer (born 1965), English writer
- Frank Steer (1901–2006), American First World War veteran
- Gary Steer (born 1970), English cricketer
- George Steer (1909–1944), British journalist and soldier
- Jed Steer (born 1992), English footballer
- John Steer (1824–1918), English merchant
- Irene Steer (1889–1947), Welsh swimmer
- Michael Steer (born 1956), Australian academic
- Philip Wilson Steer (1860–1942), British painter
- Rene Steer (born 1990), English footballer
- Ricardo Steer (born 1982), Colombian footballer
- Serafina Steer (born 1982), English harpist
- Spencer Steer (born 1997), American baseball player
- Stanley Steer (1900–1997), Anglican bishop
- Teri Steer (born 1975), American shot putter
- Trevor Steer (born 1938), Australian rules footballer
- Vincent Steer, typographer
- William Steer (1888–1969), English footballer
- Kieran Steer (born 1995), Scottish Boccia Paralympian and Powerchair Footballer.

== See also ==
- Steer (disambiguation)
- Steers (disambiguation)
