= Edward Hayden =

Edward Hayden may refer to:

- Edward D. Hayden (1833–1908), U.S. Representative from Massachusetts
- Edward Everett Hayden (1858–1932), American naval officer, inventor and meteorologist
