= Charles H. Marshall (pilot boat) =

Sandy Hook Pilot boat

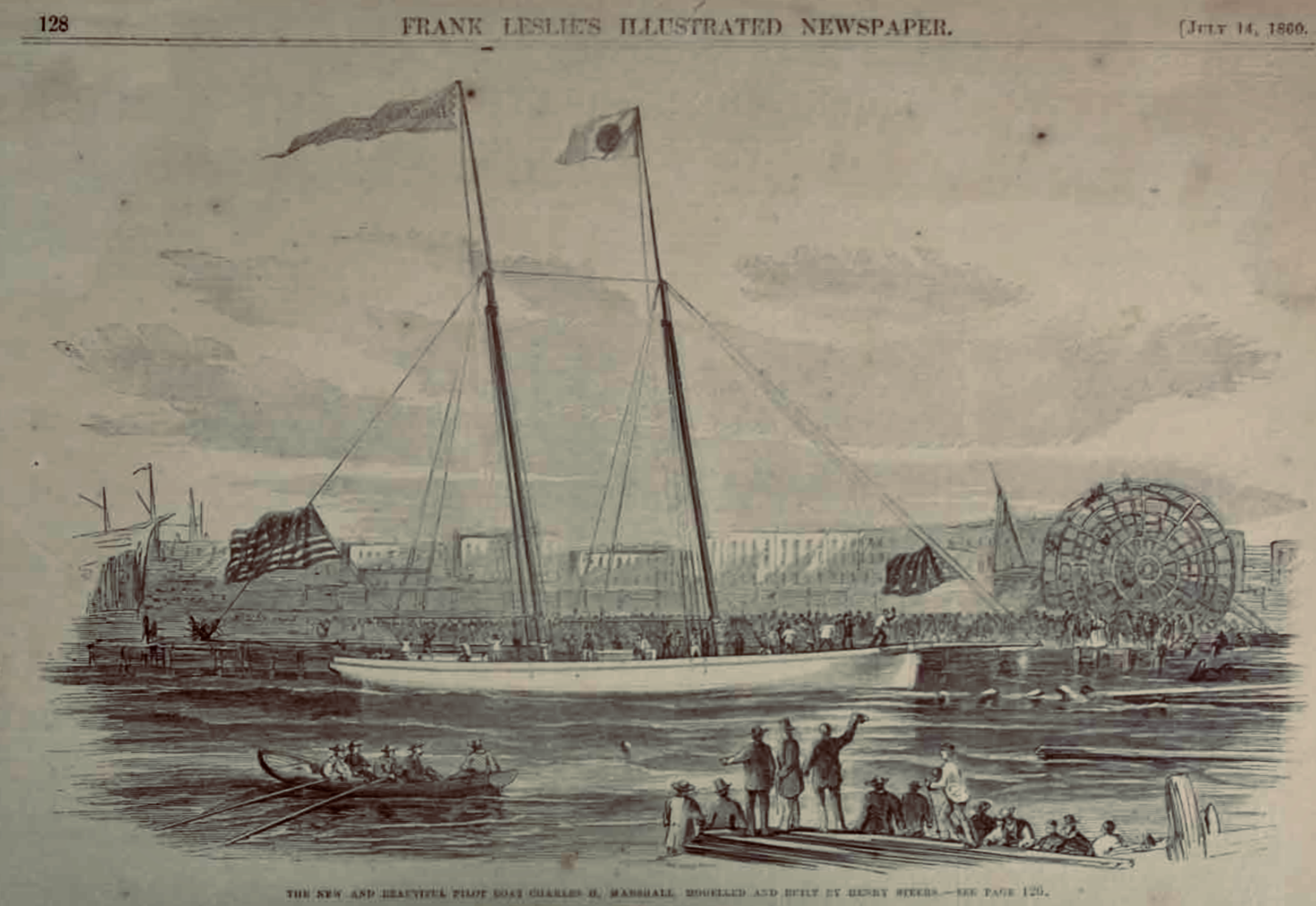
- Pilot boat Charles H. Marshall.

History

United States
- Name: Charles H. Marshall
- Namesake: Charles Henry Marshall, American businessman, art collector and philanthropist
- Owner: Josiah Johnson Sr., Frederick Nelson, Jonathan Wright
- Operator: Josiah Johnson Sr., Frederick Nelson, Jonathan Wright, John J. Canvin, Sr.
- Launched: June 20, 1860
- Out of service: 1 February 1896
- Fate: Sold

General characteristics
- Class & type: schooner
- Tonnage: 45-tons TM
- Length: 78 ft 0 in (23.77 m)
- Beam: 20 ft 0 in (6.10 m)
- Depth: 7 ft 0 in (2.13 m)
- Propulsion: Sail

The Charles H. Marshall was a 19th-century Sandy Hook pilot boat built by Henry Steers in 1860 for a group of New York pilots. She was in the Great Blizzard of 1888, the same year the National Geographic came out with an article about the successful struggle made by the crew of the Marshall. The boat was named in honor of the American businessman Charles Henry Marshall. In the age of steam she was sold in 1896.

== Construction and service ==
The new pilot-boat Charles H. Marshall was built by Henry Steers for Captain Josiah Johnson Sr., Frederick Nelson, Jonathan Wright and other New York and Sandy Hook pilots. On June 20, 1860, she was launched from the foot of Twelfth street, East River.

On 9 July 1860, the Charles H. Marshall made a trail trip to the Sandy Hook Lightship and back. Charles Henry Marshall of the Black Ball line, Moses H. Grinnell, Joseph Hoxle, George W. Blunt a Pilot Commissioner and others were on board as friends of Captain Johnson. A dinner was served on board with toasts and speeches made by the quests. The boat was named in honor of Charles Henry Marshall, an American businessman, art collector and philanthropist, who presented a silver pitcher, inscribed "Josiah Johnson, from his friend C. H. Marshall," as a testimonial to his long and faithful service.

The Charles H. Marshall, No. 3 was one of twenty-one New York pilot boats in 1860 that was in regular service.

On 17 June 1863, during the American Civil War, Captain Frederick Nelson, of the pilot-boat Charles H. Marshall, No. 3 spoke to the captain on the fishing schooner Rose, who reported that a three-masted, three gun, schooner privateer Nantucket took two barrels of mackerel and all their pork, but did not hurt anyone. He was looking for rich men and square-rigged vessels.

The Charles H. Marshall was listed in the Record of American and Foreign Shipping from 1876 to 1900. From 1876 through 1898, she was listed as owned by the New York Pilots and her Master was Jonathan Wright. From 1899 to 1900, G. Amsinck was the owner and Jonathan Wright was still master of the boat. She was listed as 45-tons, built in 1860, 78 feet in length, 20 feet in breadth, and 7 feet in depth.

On 9 October 1873, the C. H. Marshall was one of the boats that registered in the Ocean Regatta, which was a race from Owl's Head Point around to Cape May Lighthouse in New Jersey, and back to the Sandy hook Lightship, but did not appear.

William Canvin, son of John Joseph Canvin, died in 1878 by falling from the masthead of the Charles H. Marshall. Canvin Sr., was a pilot and one of the owners of the pilot-boat Charles H. Marshall. He was a pilot on the Marshall from 1860 to 1890.

== Blizzard of 1888 ==
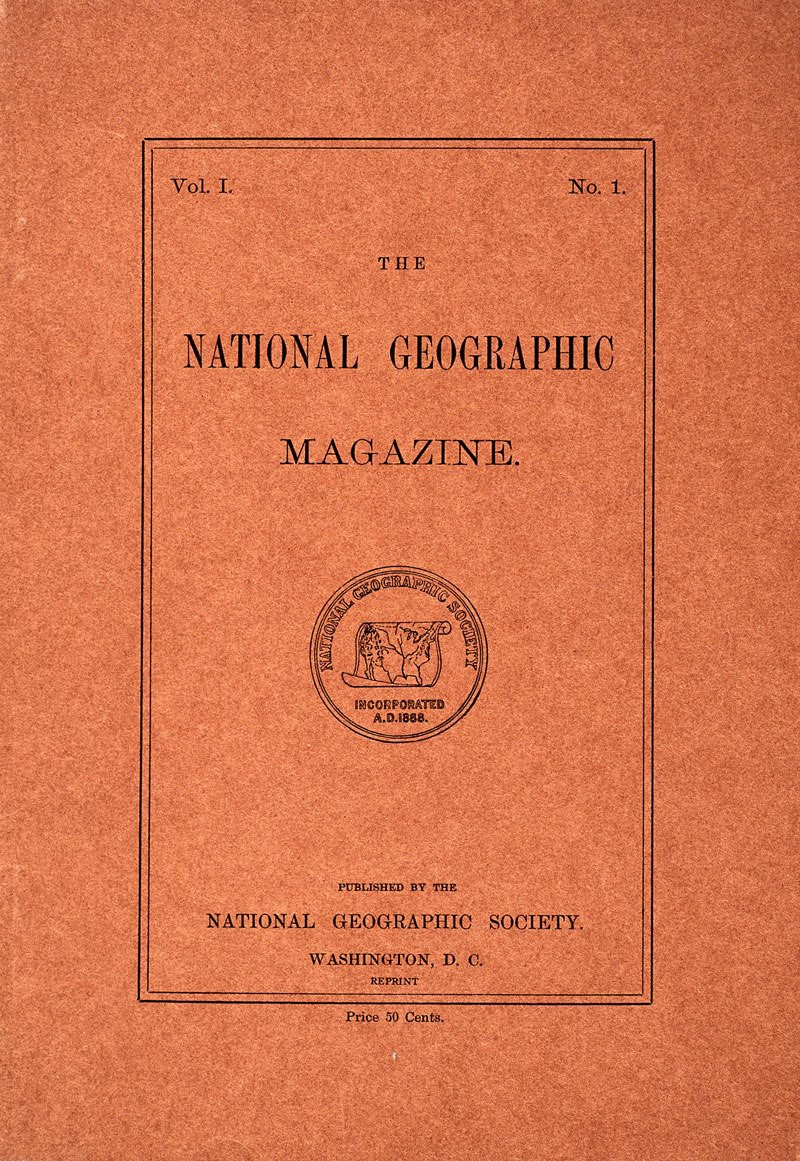
National Geographic first issue cover with article on the Great Blizzard of 1888 and the pilot-boat Charles H. Marshall.

There was an article about the Great Blizzard of 1888, by Edward Everett Hayden, that appeared in the National Geographic Society's first magazine issue on 1 October 1888.

In the Great Blizzard of 1888, boat-keeper Robert Robinson, of the Charles H. Marshall, No. 3, provided a day-by-day report. On March 10, 1888, the Marshall, left Staten Island on a cruise. When she was 18 miles from the Sandy Hook Lightship, she ran into a dense fog with snow and rain. The captain placed three oil bags hung over the side, which saved her because the oil prevented the seas from breaking. Iron bolts were put in the oil bags to keep them in the water. By March 15, the storm had passed and she was able to return to port.

When the Charles H. Marshall was about 18 miles S.E. from the lightship, a dense fog shut in, and it was decided to remain outside and ride out the storm. The wind hauled to the eastward toward midnight, and at 3 A.M. it looked so threatening in the N.W. that a fourth reef was taken in the mainsail and the foresail was treble-reefed. In half an hour the wind died out completely, and the vessel lay in the trough of a heavy S.E. sea, that was threatening every moment to engulf her. She was then about 12 miles E.S.E. from Sandy Hook lightship, and in twenty minutes the gale struck her with such force from N.W. that she was thrown on her beam ends; she instantly righted again, however, but in two hours was so covered with ice that she looked like a small iceberg.

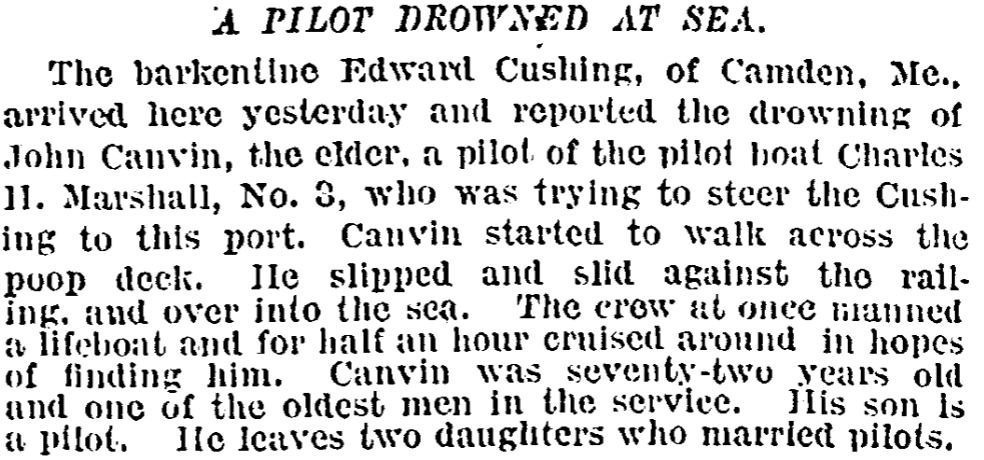
John Canvin Sr. (1824–1890) death in the New York Tribune on January 29, 1890.

On 28 January 1890, John J. Canvin Sr., boarded the barquentine Edward Cushing of Camden, Maine, from the pilot-boat Charles H. Marshall, No. 3. He drowned when he was trying to steer the barkentine off Highland Light into port. He slipped over the railing into the sea. Efforts to find him showed that he had drowned. He was 68 years old and one of the oldest pilots in the service.

== End of service ==
On 1 February 1896, the New York Pilots discarded sixteen sailboats and moved them to the Erie Basin in Brooklyn. They were replaced with steam pilot boats. The Charles H. Marshall was sold for $4,000. From 1899 to 1900, she was listed with owner G. Amsinck & Co. as owner and Jonathan Wright as Master.

== See also ==
- List of Northeastern U. S. Pilot Boats
