= Steer =

Steer(s) or steering may refer to:

== Animals ==
- Steer or bullock, castrated male cattle
- Ox, a bovine (usually a steer) used as a draft animal

== People ==
- Steer (surname)
- Steers (surname)

== Places ==
- Steer Creek (West Virginia), a tributary of the Little Kanawha River in central West Virginia in the United States
- Steer Island, a former bar island in Summers County, West Virginia
- Steer Stadium, a baseball park located in Graham, Texas

== Other uses ==
- Steering, mechanism used to turn a vehicle
- "Steer" (song), a 2007 song by Missy Higgins
- Steers, South African fast food chain
- STEER, part of the Energy policy of the European Union
- STEER, a variant of PEST analysis, a technique used in business analysis

== See also ==
- Steers (disambiguation)
- Steerage (disambiguation)
