= Great Blizzard of 1888 =

Severe snowstorm in the northeastern United States and Canada

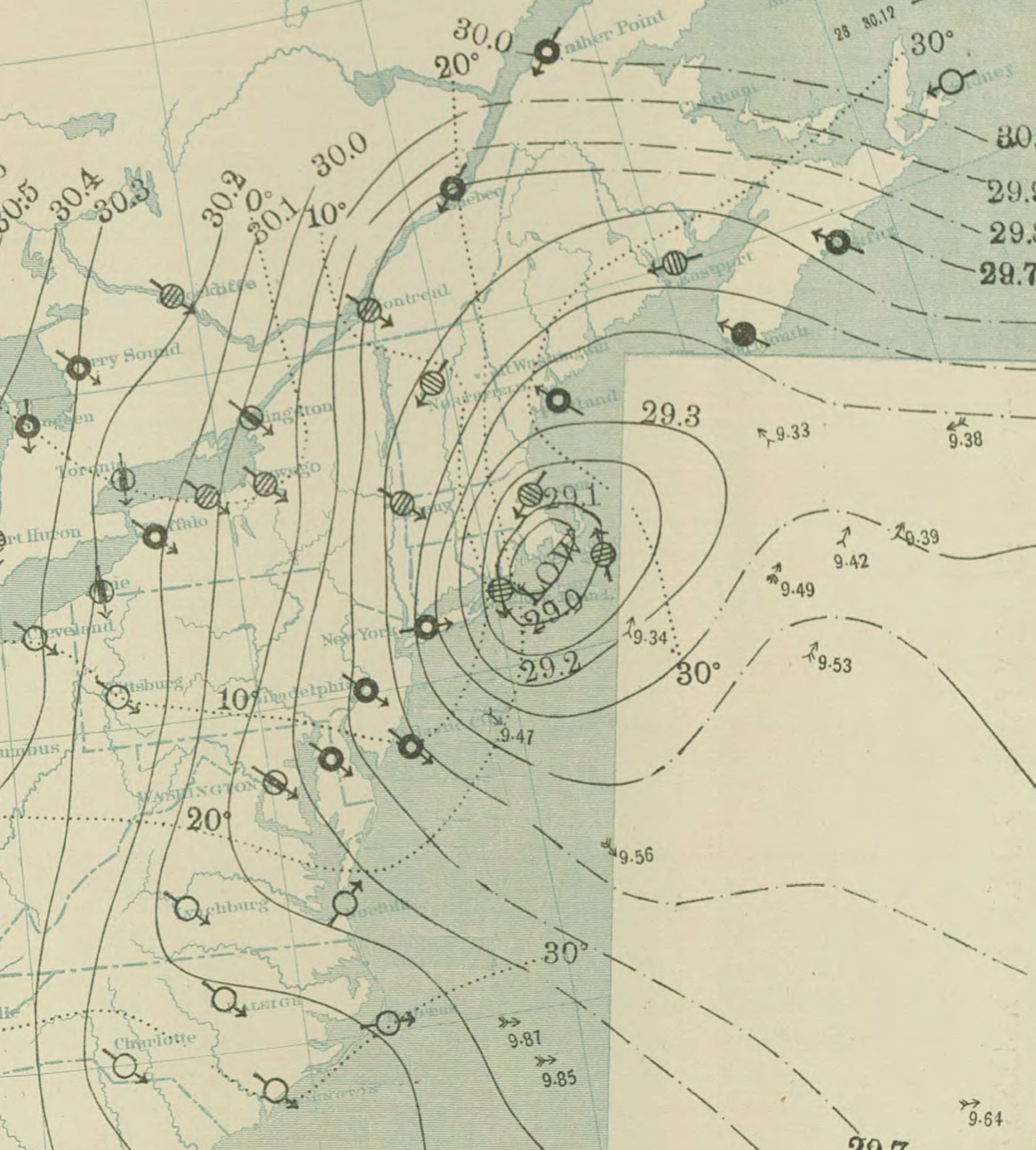
- Weather map on March 13, showing the storm over Massachusetts

Meteorological history
- Formed: March 11, 1888
- Dissipated: March 14, 1888

Blizzard
- Highest gusts: 80 mph (130 km/h)
- Lowest pressure: 980 hPa (mbar); 28.94 inHg
- Max. snowfall: 58 inches (1.5 m) in Saratoga Springs, New York

Overall effects
- Fatalities: 400
- Damage: $25 million (1888 USD) $900 million (2025 USD)
- Areas affected: Eastern United States, Eastern Canada
- Part of the 1887–88 North American winter

The Great Blizzard of 1888, also known as the Great Blizzard of '88 or the Great White Hurricane (March 11–14, 1888), was one of the most severe recorded blizzards and deadliest blizzard in American history. The storm paralyzed the East Coast from the Chesapeake Bay to Maine, as well as the Atlantic provinces of Canada. Snow from 10 to 58 inches (25 to 150 cm) fell in parts of New Jersey, New York, Massachusetts, Rhode Island, and Connecticut, and sustained winds of more than 45 miles per hour (72 km/h; 39 kn) produced snowdrifts in excess of 50 feet (15 m). Railroads were shut down and people were confined to their homes for up to a week. Railway and telegraph lines were disabled, and this provided the impetus to move these pieces of infrastructure underground. Emergency services were also affected during this blizzard.

== Meteorological history ==
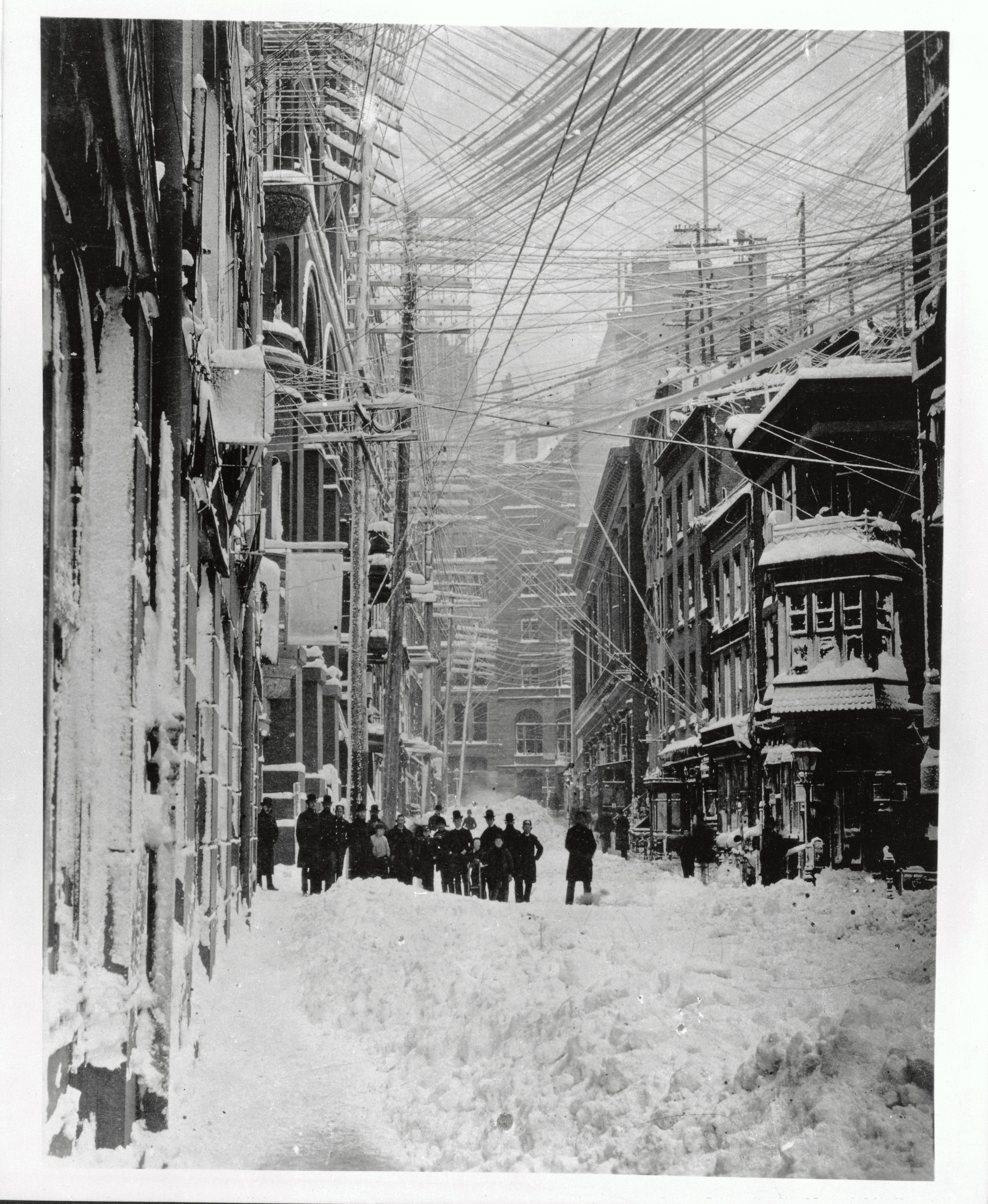
Streets in New York City as the storm hit. Many overhead wires broke and presented a hazard to city dwellers.

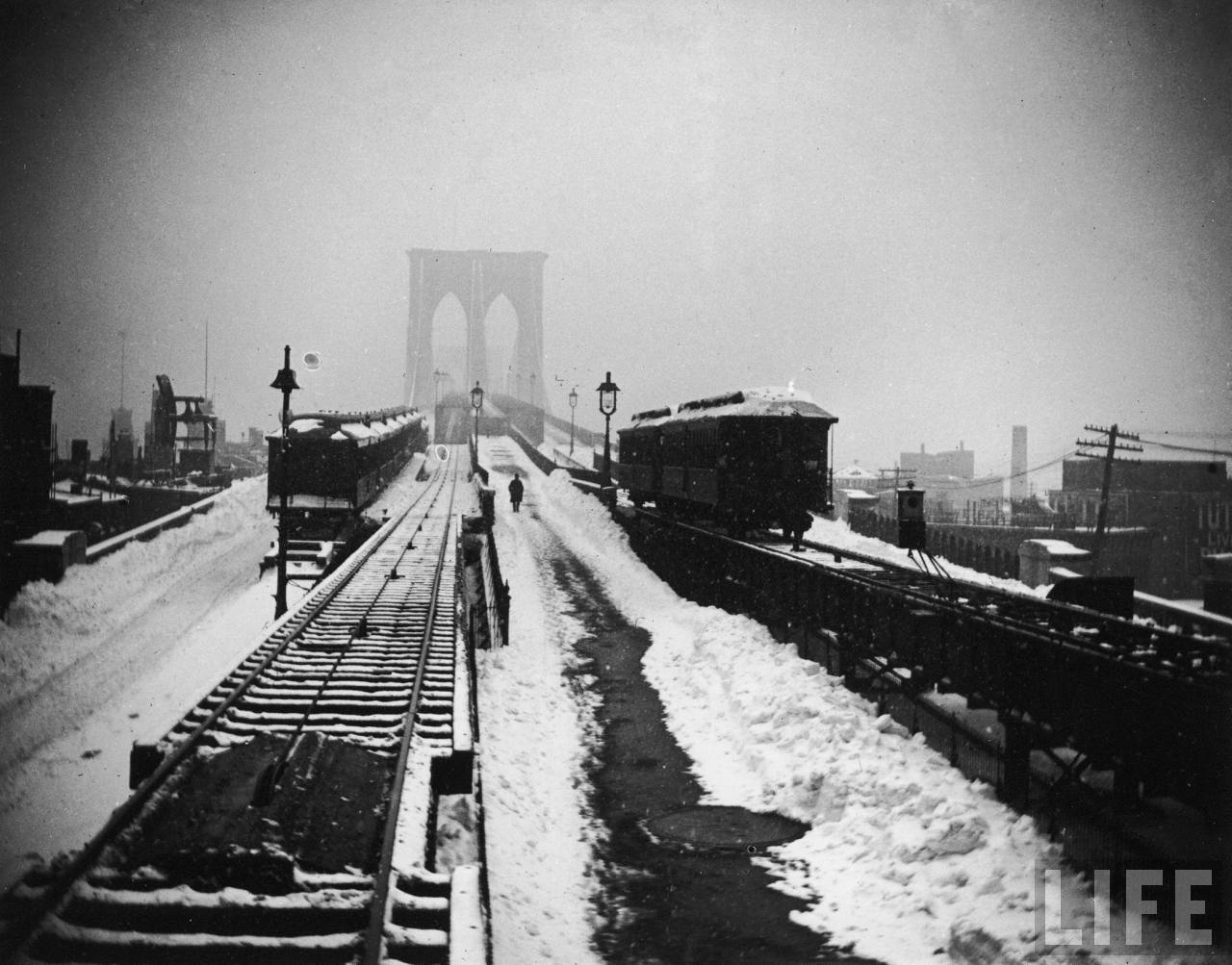
Brooklyn Bridge during the blizzard

The weather was unseasonably mild just before the blizzard, with heavy rains that turned to snow as temperatures dropped rapidly. On March 12, New York City dropped from 33 °F (1 °C) to 8 °F (−13 °C), and rain changed to snow at 1 A.M. The storm began in earnest shortly after midnight on March 12 and continued unabated for a full day and a half. In a 2007 article, the National Weather Service estimated that this nor'easter dumped as much as 50 inches (1.3 m) of snow in parts of Connecticut and Massachusetts, while parts of New Jersey and New York had up to 40 inches (1.0 m). Most of northern Vermont received from 20 inches (0.51 m) to 30 inches (0.76 m).

Drifts averaged 30–40 feet (9.1–12.2 m), over the tops of houses from New York to New England, with reports of drifts covering three-story houses. The highest drift was recorded in Gravesend, Brooklyn at 52 feet or 16 meters. 58 inches (1.5 m) of snow fell in Saratoga Springs, New York; 48 inches (1.2 m) in Albany, New York; 45 inches (1.1 m) in New Haven, Connecticut; and 22 inches (0.56 m) in New York City. The storm also produced severe winds; 80 miles per hour (129 km/h) wind gusts were reported, although the highest official report in New York City was 40 miles per hour (64 km/h; 35 kn), with a 54 miles per hour (87 km/h; 47 kn) gust reported at Block Island. On March 13, New York City recorded a low of 6 °F (−14 °C), the coldest so late in the season, with the high rising to only 12 °F (−11 °C).

== Impacts ==
In New York, neither rail nor road transport was possible anywhere for days, and drifts across the New York–New Haven rail line at Westport, Connecticut, took eight days to clear. Transportation gridlock as a result of the storm was partially responsible for the creation of the first underground subway system in the United States, which opened nine years later in Boston, as well as the opening of New York's first underground subway line in 1904, later expanding into the New York City Subway. The New York Stock Exchange was closed for two days. A full two day weather-related closure would not occur again until Hurricane Sandy in 2012.

Similarly, telegraph infrastructure was disabled, isolating Montreal and most of the large northeastern U.S. cities from Washington, D.C. to Boston for days. Following the storm, New York began placing its telegraph and telephone infrastructure underground to prevent their destruction.

Fire stations were immobilized, and property loss from fire alone was estimated at $25 million (equivalent to $900 million in 2025).

From the Chesapeake Bay through the New England area, more than 200 ships were either grounded or wrecked, resulting in the deaths of at least 100 seamen. Efforts were made to push the snow into the Atlantic Ocean. Severe flooding occurred after the storm due to melting snow, especially in the Brooklyn area, which was susceptible to flooding because of its topography.

Not all areas were notably affected by the Blizzard of 1888; an article in the Cambridge Press published five days after the storm noted that the "fall of snow in this vicinity was comparatively small, and had it not been accompanied by a strong wind it would have been regarded as rather trifling in amount, the total depth, on a level, not exceeding ten inches".

Roscoe Conkling, an influential Republican politician, died a few weeks after attempting to walk home during the blizzard.

On October 1, 1888, an article appeared in the first issue of the National Geographic Society magazine about the great blizzard. It was written by Edward Everett Hayden and described the blizzard and the courageous and successful struggle, told by boat-keeper Robert Robinson, of the crew from the pilot-boat Charles H. Marshall, No. 3.

== Gallery ==
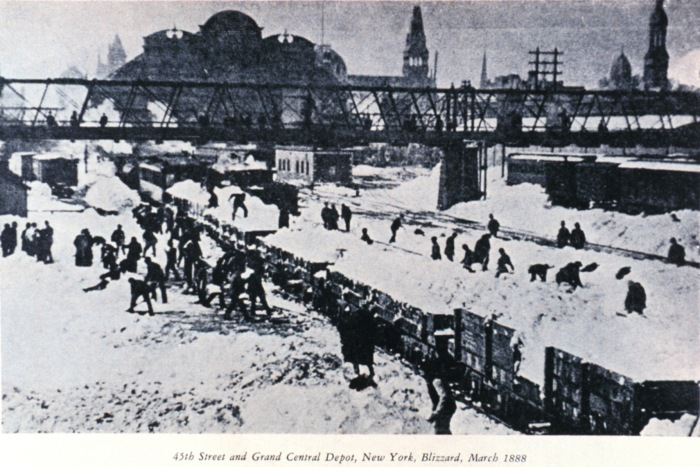
45th Street and Grand Central Depot, Manhattan, March 12

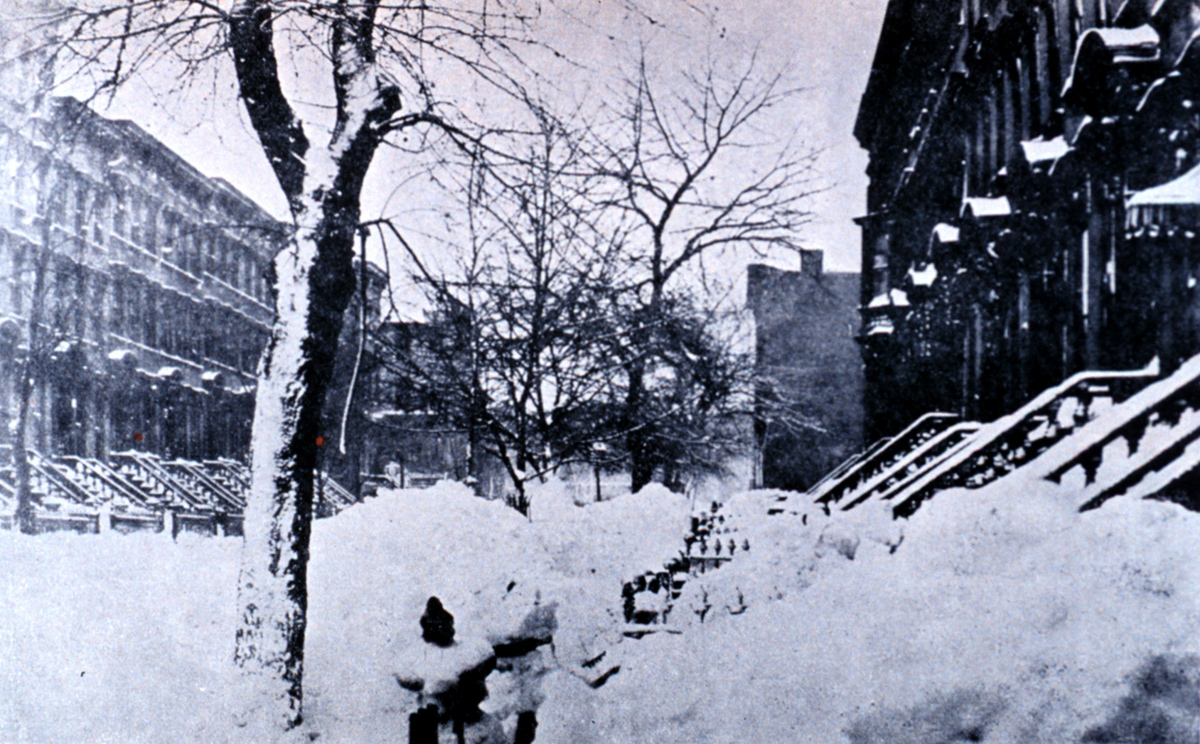
Park Place in Brooklyn, March 14

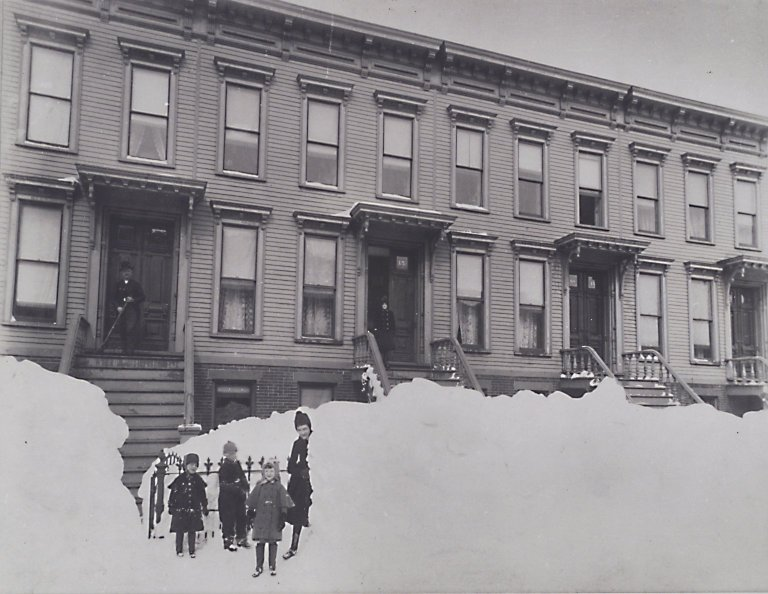
Brooklyn children after the blizzard

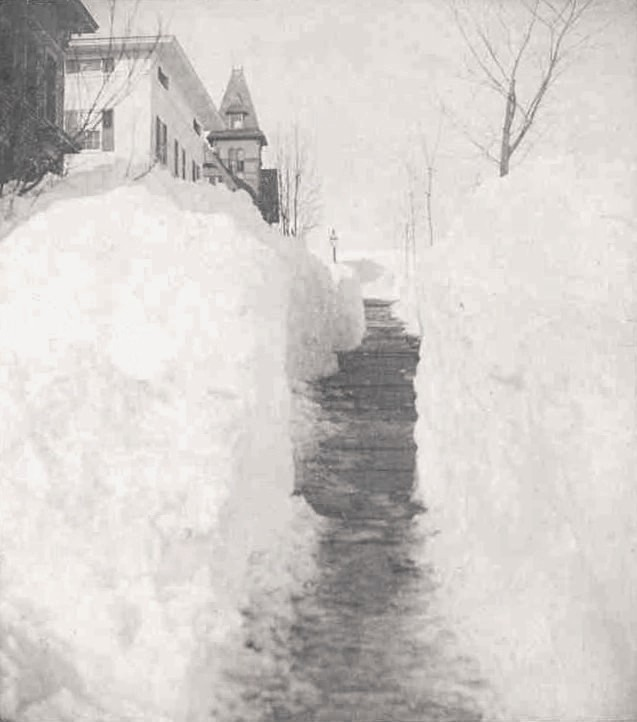
New Britain, Connecticut, March 13

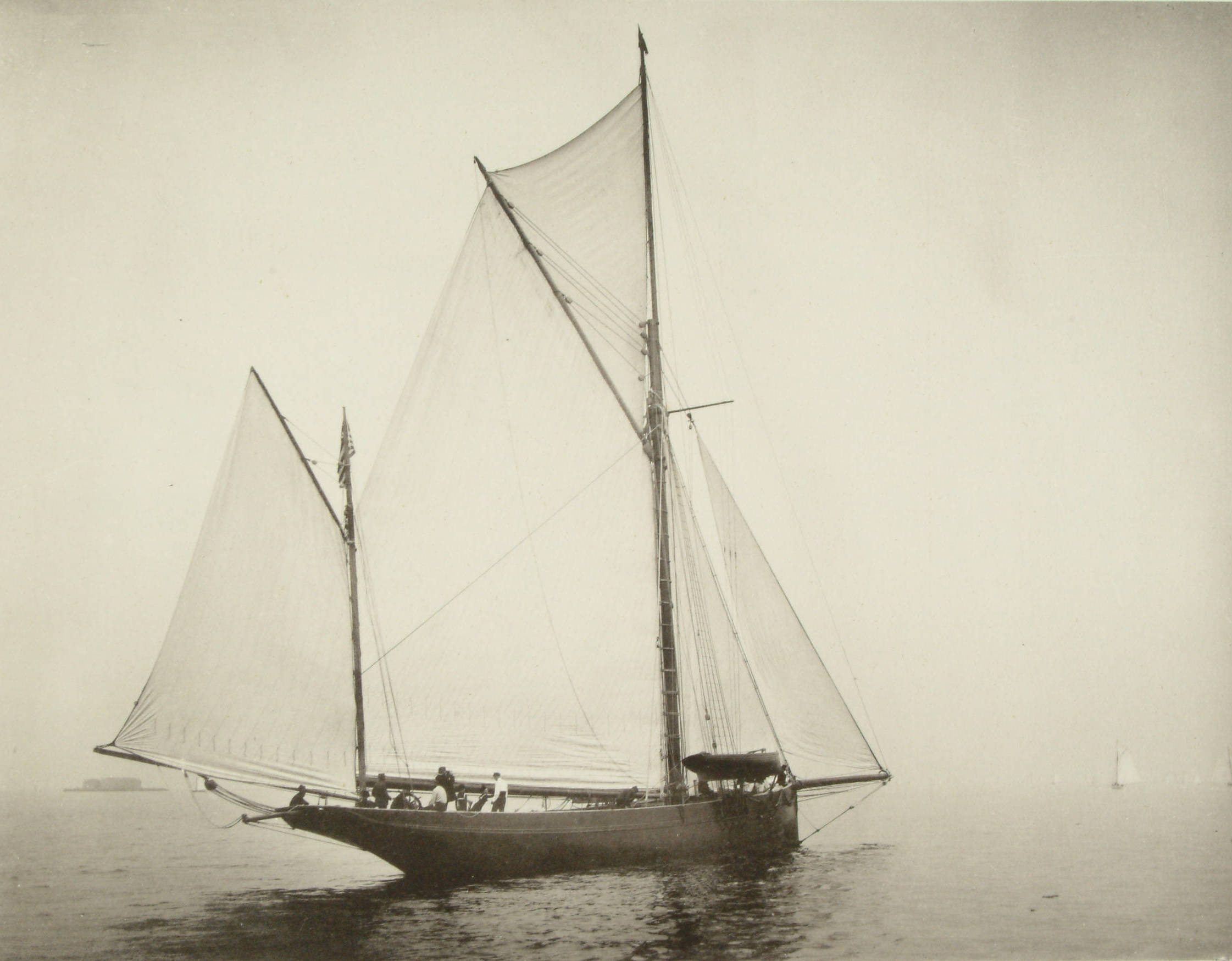
Cythera, lost with all aboard in the blizzard

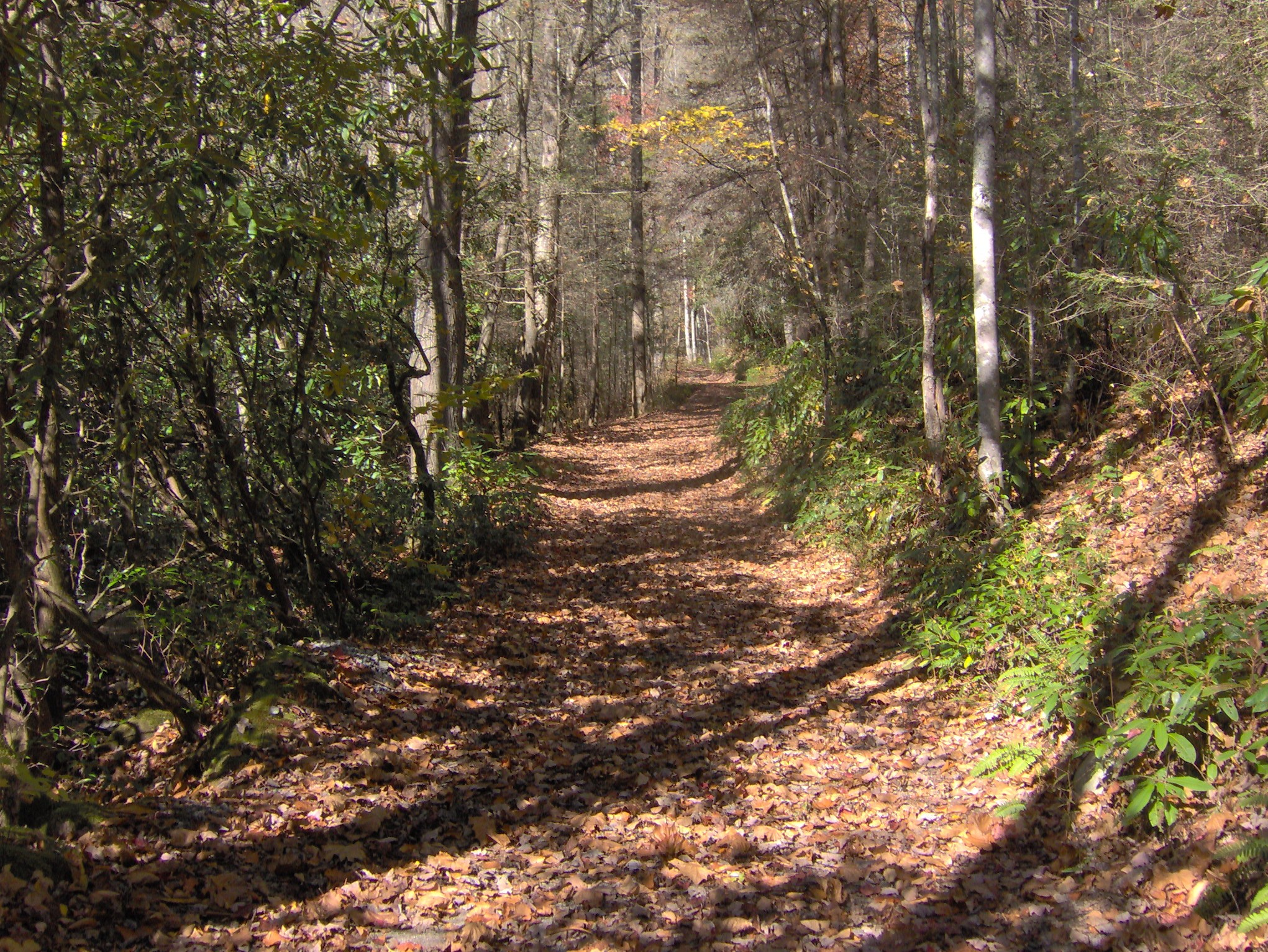
Bone Valley Trail, where a herd of cattle froze

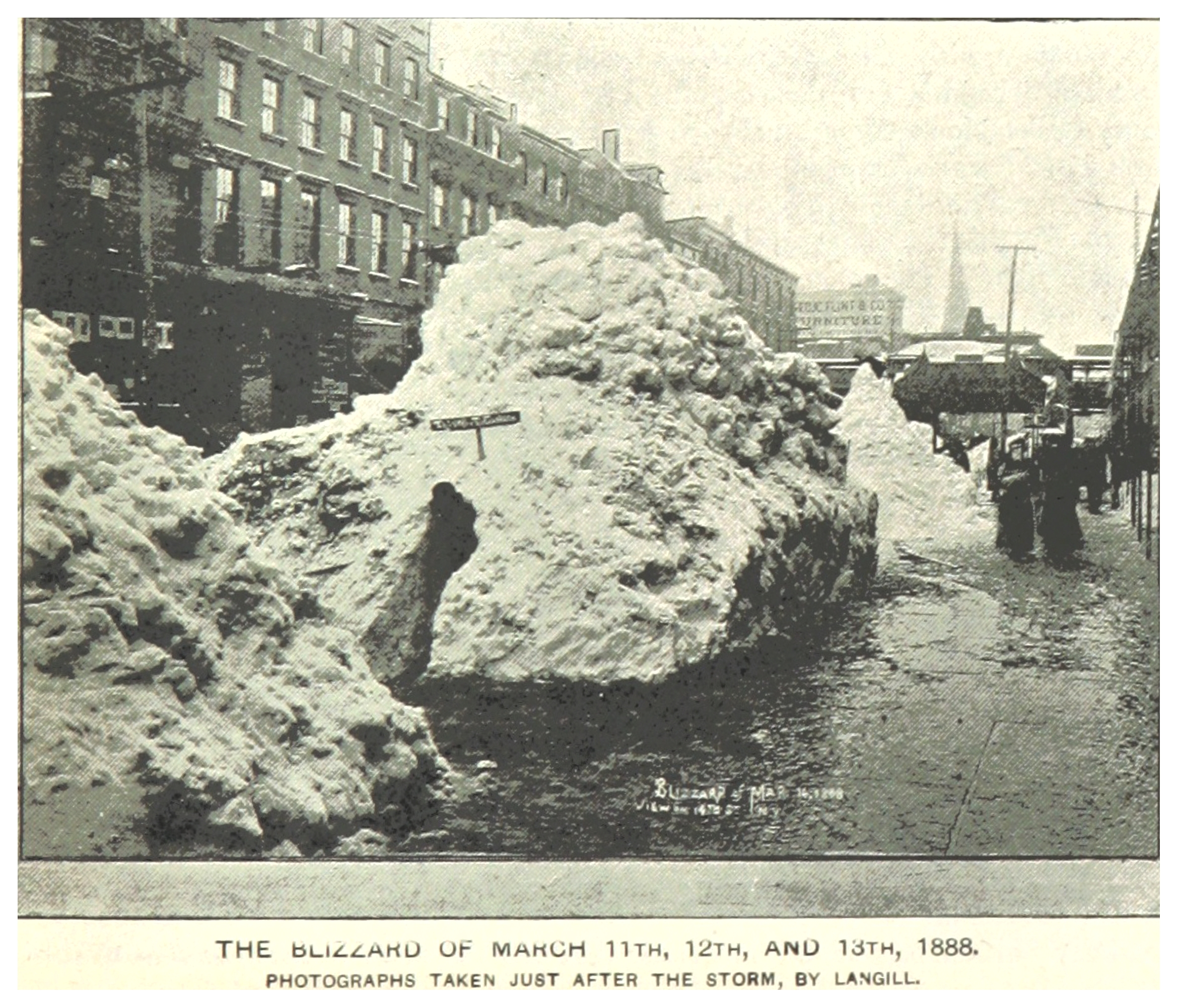
14th Street, New York City, "just after the storm" (March 14)
