= Prostitution in Honolulu during World War II =

During World War II, a regulated system of brothel prostitution operated in Honolulu in the Territory of Hawaii. Under the martial law declared after the attack on Pearl harbor, the brothels were unofficially and jointly regulated by the United States military and the Honolulu police, serving thousands of service members every day. Customers paid a fixed price of three dollars for three minutes with a prostitute. The system was ended in 1944 after Governor Ingram Stainback ordered the brothels closed.

== History ==
=== Background ===
In 1835, the Hawaiian Kingdom passed a law making "illicit connections," including prostitution, illegal. This law was strengthened by the 1841 "Law Respecting Lewdness" and the 1860 "Act to Mitigate the Evils and diseases arising from Prostitution." Despite the illegal nature of prostitution, a red-light district operated in Honolulu from the beginning of the 20th century until May 1917. After the authorities forcibly closed the district, brothels reopened in other parts of the city and were allowed to operate under an unofficial set of regulations rather than face suppression. The regulations included a ban on liquor, narcotics, and pimps. The "madams" who operated the brothels were allowed to send for girls from San Francisco who, once arriving in Honolulu, would be met by police officers who photographed and fingerprinted them before sending them onwards to their assigned brothel. This system functionally made prostitutes second-class citizens entirely reliant on their madams and the authorities for survival, as they were banned from owning property, riding bicycles, having boyfriends, or patronizing bars.

=== Martial law ===
After the attack on Pearl Harbor on December 7, 1941, Governor Joseph Poindexter placed the entire territory under martial law. After this, many members of the military began visiting previously taboo areas of Honolulu, including tattoo parlors and the unofficially regulated brothels. The brothels especially were popular, with lines often stretching down the block from early in the morning until late at night. This was unpopular with the citizens of Hawaii, who did not wish to damage the island's reputation as a tourist destination. The system of regulation continued under military command, with military police patrolling brothels and inspecting them alongside civilian police. One change made under military supervision was the pricing, with Frank Steer (provost marshal of Hawaii) ordering the price of a visit to be set at $3.

=== 1942 strike ===
In August 1942, prostitutes in Honolulu went on strike, picketing the police stations and ʻIolani Palace. The strike was in response to the regulations, which they viewed as overly strict, and they demanded the right to live outside of the brothels. This was granted and the strike ended after 22 days.

=== Closure and legacy ===
In 1943, the FBI began investigating the brothels for allegedly being owned by ex-convicts. The next year, martial law in Hawaii was ended and the civilian government resumed control of the territory. On September 21, 1944, Governor Ingram Stainback ordered all brothels in Honolulu closed.

In 1992, Beth Bailey and David Farber published the book The First Strange Place, about the sex industry in Hawaii during World War II. One chapter followed a prostitute from Chicago and a military policeman assigned to the red-light district. One reviewer, writing in The Hawaiian Journal of History, described the district as "a veritable fornication factory." By 2015, nearly every building that had housed a brothel in Honolulu was still standing, with walking tours offered of the former red-light district.

== Operation ==
The brothels primarily operated out of upstairs rooms, leading to the euphemism "let's go climb the stairs" arising in reference to visiting the brothels. During a typical visit, a customer would pay for a poker chip, was manually inspected for venereal disease, and then given three minutes with a prostitute before being removed. This system, functioning similar to an assembly line, meant that prostitutes regularly saw close to one hundred customers a day and could make $25,000 a year (equivalent to $547,229 in 2025). According to Jean O'Hara, a high-profile prostitute at the time, a third of the working prostitutes were addicted to morphine.
