= James Steers =

James Steers may refer to:

- James Alfred Steers (1899–1987), English geomorphologist
- James Rich Steers (1808–1896), American yacht builder
