= J. Rich Steers =

J. Rich Steers, Inc.
- Type: Construction and civil engineering
- Industry: Construction
- Predecessor: Henry Steers, Inc.
- Founded: 1929
- Founder: J. Rich Steers, Jr.
- Defunct: 1986
- Headquarters: New York City, US

J. Rich Steers, Inc. was a prominent New York-based contracting company focusing on waterfront work. It specialized in heavy maritime infrastructure projects such as bridge and pier construction, tunnel, foundation and sewer and drain work. The firm and its related businesses maintained offices at 17 Battery Place in lower Manhattan until ceasing operations in 1986.

== Family and background ==
Of English descent, the Steers family had been involved in various maritime pursuits for over 200 years in England and the US, a long lineage that included involvement in the Plymouth Royal Dockyards. The family came to the United States in 1817, when naval architect Henry Steers relocated to New York City with his sons James Rich Steers (1808-1896) and George Steers. James would go on to co-found the boatbuilding concern George Steers and Co with George, who is perhaps best known as the designer of the yacht America, winner of the first America's Cup race. James Sr. was succeeded in the business by his own son Henry Steers, born in 1832.

A number of American Steers family members, including company founder and owner James Rich Steers Jr. (d. 1936), his brother, also named Henry Steers (1865-1928), and Henry Coster Steers (d. 1947), among others, were graduates of Saint Paul's School in Concord, New Hampshire.

== Origins ==
First incorporated in 1904 as Henry Steers, Inc., the company changed its name to J. Rich Steers, Inc. in 1929, with the owner being James Rich Steers, Jr. At its height the company employed over 350 staff, drawing heavily upon construction industry personnel with backgrounds in the military, railroad and utility company construction fields. Later the family's concerns would also expand to include related company Steers Sand and Gravel, which maintained a plant in Northport, NY from 1923 onward, and the Steers Towing Company, founded in 1934.

== Projects ==
The Steers firm often obtained contracts in partnership or joint venture with other construction companies, and the bulk of the company's work was focused on the New York City waterfront and environs. This included the construction of major portions of Manhattan's East River Drive. Work in the city's outer boroughs included the building of the Hunts Point Sewage Treatment Plant in the Bronx for the NYC Department of Public Works, as well as the creation of flood-prevention measures at La Guardia Airport on behalf of the Port Authority. In 1939 the firm participated in the construction of the Cross Bay Blvd. Bridge connecting Queens to the Rockaways for the New York City Department of Parks, designed by Madigan-Hyland.

Steers' work in New Jersey included building the foundations of the now-defunct CRRNJ Newark Bay Bridge, constructed for the Central Railroad of New Jersey The firm also did significant work for PSE&G, including the building of foundations for the ubiquitous bulk oil storage tanks which are a hallmark of the industrial northern New Jersey landscape. Other work in New Jersey included the accelerated rebuilding of a wooden railway trestle that had burned down in Matawan, NJ in 1946, in which over 150 laborers worked around the clock to quickly replace this vital commuter link.

The firm also executed work outside of the New York metropolitan area, including the foundations of the Chesapeake Bay Bridge and Texas Tower 4 for the US military.

== First World War ==
The firm, then known under the Henry Steers name, gained attention during World War I when a high-profile labor dispute erupted concerning claims by the AFL and unionized carpenters that Steers had employed ironworkers to do work that was rightfully theirs as part of the construction of barracks in Pelham Bay. Steers eventually agreed to employ carpenters for the project, ending their protest work stoppage on Army cantonment construction work and averting a threatened strike by over 50,000 union members.

== Second World War ==
The company obtained contracts as part of the war effort to build invasion craft, beginning a long relationship with the US Navy. In partnership with Walsh Construction, they assembled LCMs and built LCTs in a facility in Jersey City.

In 1946, along with 90 other companies operating in the New York harbor including the Steers Sand and Gravel Company and the Steers Towing Company, J. Rich Steers was placed under the control of the Office of Defense Transportation for the duration of the conflict. This was done by executive order of President Harry Truman in order to overcome the disruption caused by labor strikes and disputes.

== Post-WWII ==
After the conclusion of WWII, the company extended its efforts outside of the US as part of post-war reconstruction and Cold War development. In partnership with Grove, Shephard, Wilson & Kruge, Steers rebuilt harbors in Greece and reconstructed the Corinth Canal on behalf of the US Navy, and constructed a radio station for the Voice of America in Tangier, Morocco. The business made headlines again in 1962 when Steers Sand and Gravel Company tugboat MV Gwendoline Steers sank with all hands lost during a severe and sudden winter storm in Long Island Sound. In 1963, the firm reported $26 million in contracts

Locally, the firm constructed the dock, bulkhead and dike serving the Sewaren Generating Station on the Arthur Kill in 1948, the Queens side anchorage of the Throgs Neck Bridge in 1961, and the Commodore Barry Bridge over the Delaware River in 1974.

== Equipment ==
In order to execute the large and complex maritime projects which were its stock in trade, Steers possessed a sizable stock of heavy equipment and vehicles. In addition to numerous cranes, floating derricks and pile drivers, this included over 50 deck scows and a fleet of 10 tugboats led by the company's "flagship" vessel, the J. Rich Steers. At the time of the company's closure, most of the corporate equipment went to Weeks Marine in Cranford, New Jersey.

== Legacy ==
The firm's legacy lives on in the form of the J. Rich Steers Award, awarded for academic performance that shows potential for further engineering study and practice. This is bestowed annually by the New York City Post, Society of American Military Engineers.
