= Steers =

Steers may refer to:

- Steer (cattle) or bullock, castrated male cattle
- Steers (restaurant), a South African restaurant chain
- Steers (surname)
- Steers (island), a former island of Indonesia
- J. Rich Steers, an American engineering company
- Kansas City Steers, an American former basketball team
- Steering, control of the direction of motion

== See also ==
- Steer (disambiguation)
- Steer (surname)
