= Francis Perkins (pilot boat) =

New York Pilot boat

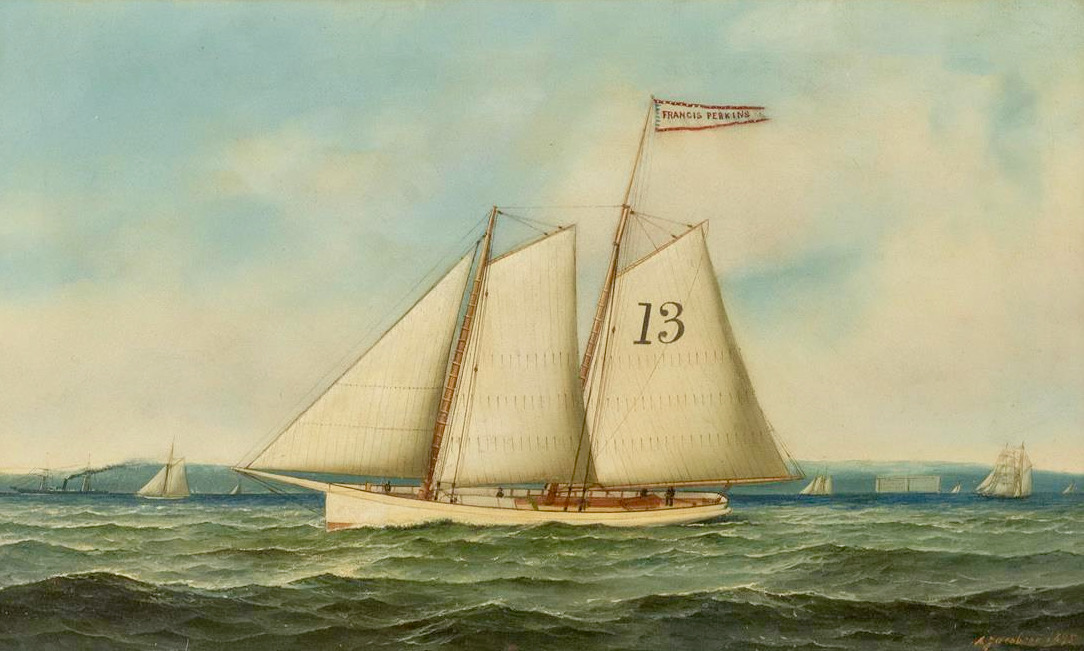
- New York pilot boat Francis Perkins, No. 13 by Antonio Jacobsen.

History

United States
- Name: Francis Perkins
- Namesake: Francis Perkins, secretary of the Pilot Commissioners
- Owner: New York Pilots' Association
- Operator: Captain T. Aitken, and Vinner
- Builder: Henry Steers
- Cost: $20,000
- Launched: October 7, 1866
- Out of service: January 24, 1887
- Stricken: Aries steamship
- Fate: Sank

General characteristics
- Class & type: schooner
- Tonnage: 50-tons TM
- Length: 78 ft 5 in (23.90 m)
- Beam: 20 ft 6 in (6.25 m)
- Depth: 8 ft 6 in (2.59 m)
- Propulsion: Sail

Francis Perkins, No. 13 was a 19th-century Sandy Hook pilot boat, built by Henry Steers in 1866 for a group of New York Pilots. She was considered one of the finest boats ever built. During a snow storm in 1887, the Perkins struck the steamship Aries and sank near the Barnegat shoals.

== Construction and service ==
New York pilot-boat Francis Perkins, No. 13 was built by Henry Steers in 1866 in Greenpoint, Brooklyn. The boat number "13" was painted as a large number on her mainsail, that identified the boat as belonging to the Sandy Hook Pilots. She went on her first trial trip on October 7, 1866, with a large party of guests on board. She was named after Francis Perkins, the secretary of the New York Commissioners of Pilots. Her cost is $20,00.

The Francis Perkins was registered with the Record of American and Foreign Shipping from 1871 to 1887, with the New York Pilots' Association as owners. She was 78.5 in length, 20.5 in breadth of beam, 8.6 in depth of hold, 52-tons and built in 1866 with T. Aitken, and Vinner as Masters. She was considered one of the finest pilot boats ever built.

In 1873, near Nantucket Lightship, the Francis Perkins came across an abandoned brig. The pilots of the Perkins boarded her and towed her safely into port.

== End of service ==
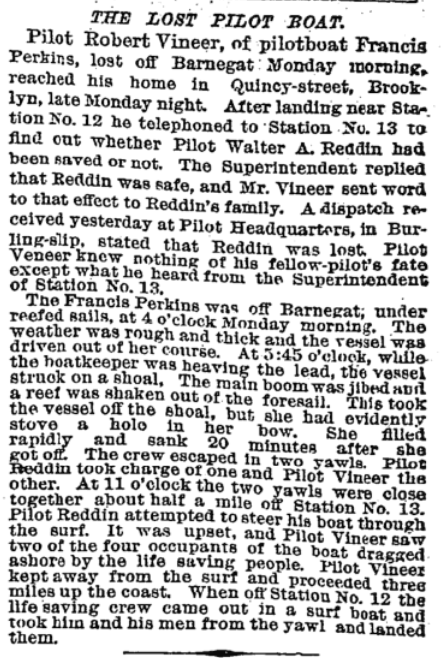
The Lost Pilot Boat in the New York Times on January 26, 1887

On January 24, 1887, the New York pilot-boat Francis Perkins, No. 13 was in a gale and snow storm. Thinking the that lights on the shore were from the lighthouse, the Francis Perkins struck the steamer Aries that was driven ashore by the storm wreck near the Barnegat shoals, in Ocean County, New Jersey. She sprang a leak and sank in deep waters. Six of the crew were saved and two were lost. The men tried to escape in two yawls. Pilots Robert Vineer in charge of one and Walter A. Reddin in the other. Pilot Reddin and the cook, William Dalton, were lost trying to reach the shore. The Perkins was estimated to be worth $15,000.

Pilot Walter A. Reddin was one of the two men lost on the Perkins. He was a member of the Sandy Hook Pilots' Benevolent Association, which paid $600 to his widow. He was also a member of the Pilots' Charitable Fund, that paid an annual amount for the rest of Mrs. Reddin's life. A funeral for Pilot Walter A. Reddin took place on February 7, 1887, at the St. Ambrose's Catholic Church in Brooklyn.

== See also ==
- List of Northeastern U. S. Pilot Boats
