= Steerage (disambiguation) =

Steerage is a lower deck of a ship

Steerage may also refer to:

- Steering#Watercraft, the act of steering a ship
- The Steerage, an Alfred Stieglitz photograph

== See also ==
- Economy class
- Steer (disambiguation)
- Steerage Act of 1819
