= Colin Banks =

British designer (1932–2002)

- Born: 16 January 1932; Ruislip, England
- Died: 9 March 2002 (aged 70); Blackheath, London, England
- Education: Kent Institute of Art & Design; University for the Creative Arts
- Occupations: Designer and typographer
- Known for: Co-founder of Banks & Miles, designers and typographers

Colin Banks (16 January 1932 – 9 March 2002) was an English designer who co-founded Banks & Miles, designers and typographers, in London in 1958 with John Miles. Major clients of the partnership included the Consumers' Association, the Post Office, British Telecom and London Transport, for whom they redesigned Edward Johnston's famous "Underground Sans" typeface, as New Johnston.

== Early life ==
Banks was born in Ruislip, England, and grew up in Margate. He went to Rochester and Maidstone schools of art (both became Kent Institute of Art & Design, then eventually the University for the Creative Arts), and met John Miles at Maidstone.

== Career ==
With John Miles, he was the Production Editor of Which?, and associated magazines, from 1964 to 1993.

== Typography ==
Banks was an influential designer, and his Telecom (T) identity, created for British Telecommunications when it was instituted in 1981, spawned many imitators. Its replacement by Wolff Olins' BT "piper" was received with much derision in 1991. Banks received a prestigious RSA/BBC Design Award in 1990, for the paper-saving redesign of the UK's Phonebook. Miles and Banks designed the Royal Mail's and the UK Post Office's distinctive "double-line" alphabet in 1972 and New Johnston, a revival of Edward Johnston's "Underground Sans", for London Transport. They also designed the logo of Lancaster University.

Banks was President of the International Society of Typographic Designers (ISTD) from 1988 to 1993 and 2000 to 2002.

== Publications ==
His approach is described by David Jury in the book About Face: "For Banks, it was important to respect the spirit of Johnston rather than adhere mechanically to the construction rules which would have made any further development of the design impossible." Banks would later design a limited-edition book for the organisation as a tribute to Edward Johnston.

== Personal life ==
He was married since 1961 to zoologist Dr Caroline Grigson (daughter of the poet Geoffrey Grigson and his first wife). They had a daughter, Frances, who was killed in a road accident in 1978, and a son, Joe.

In 2002, Banks died of cancer in Blackheath, London, aged 70.
