= International Society of Typographic Designers =

- Abbreviation: ISTD
- Formation: 1928
- Legal status: not-for-profit Company Limited by Guarantee
- Purpose: Establish and maintain standards of typography
- Region served: Worldwide
- Affiliations: Icograda
- Website: www.istd.org.uk
- Remarks: Founded as the British Typographers' Guild

The International Society of Typographic Designers (ISTD) is a professional body run by and for typographers, graphic designers, and educators. The society has an international membership and its aims are to establish and maintain standards of typography and to provide a forum for debate.

== History ==
The ISTD was originally formed as the British Typographers' Guild (BTG) in 1928, when Vincent Steer and friends met in a Sicilian restaurant in Holborn, to found the society. Steer recognized the need and the potential for the creative typographer's skills in a world where most 'design' was carried out through compositors' layouts. From his own background in printing, and the opportunity to observe the trade in America, he determined to develop the profession of typography in the UK, and to that end started the British Typographers Guild with six other like-minded founding members.

In 1953 the guild became the Society of Typographic Designers (STD), and in 1999, recognizing its influence in other countries, and at the behest of then President Colin Banks, it became the International Society of Typographic Designers (ISTD).

== TypoGraphic ==
TypoGraphic is the journal of the ISTD and was first published in 1971. Selected writings from 30 years of TypoGraphic were published in an anthology in 2001.

A complete set of TypoGraphic journals is available at the St Bride Library.

== ISTD International Typographic Awards ==
The ISTD runs the International Typographic Awards which are held as an appraisal of current standards in typographic design and are judged by some of today's leading graphic, interactive and typographic design specialists:

- A Certificate of Excellence, awarded to all finalists, signifies a high standard of design in conjunction with a high standard of typography.
- Premier Awards, awarded to designers of outstanding submissions, are offered for work that has not only met the criteria for the award of a Certificate of Excellence, but which is also considered outstanding by a majority of the jurors.
- The winning submission, selected from all of the Premier Awards, is judged to be the most significant typographical achievement, exemplifying excellence.

The ISTD Awards are held every three years: there were awards in 2011 and 2014, and after a long gap, the next awards will be during 2023.

== Categories of membership ==
The ISTD has several categories of membership, some with designatory postnominals:

- Honorary Fellowship (HonFISTD) is awarded in recognition of outstanding typographic design work, or significant contribution to the aims of, or service to, the ISTD or the typographic industry.
- Fellowship (FISTD) is awarded in recognition of the nominee's professional standing or for their services to the ISTD.
- Membership (MISTD) is open to all practising typographers, graphic designers, and educators who show, by submission of their typographic design work, or through evidence of competence in their field of activity, that their professional ability has reached the high standard required by the ISTD.
- Student Membership is open to students who are successful in the Student Assessment.
- Corporate Membership is open to design organizations, companies, and other commercial institutions to support the ISTD.
- Institutional Membership is open to educational institutions involved in the delivery of typographic studies. This offers a range of benefits including reduced submission fees for students submitting projects for assessment and teaching materials from the ISTD education archive.

== ISTD Student Assessment ==
The annual Student Assessment, started in 1975, allows students to gain entry to the ISTD. This is achieved by assessment of their work applied to a rigorous brief (five new project briefs are published in October each year), and is open to those registered on a recognised full-time undergraduate or postgraduate course. Assessment is carried out by teams of practicing designers and typographic educators.

Student Assessments are held in England, Ireland, Middle East, South Africa and Australia to deal with the submissions relating to each location. These are coordinated by the ISTD Education Team under the aegis of the Education Director.
