= Jean O'Hara =

American prostitute

- Born: Betty Jean O'Hara; 1913; Chicago, Illinois, U.S.
- Died: 1973 (aged 59–60)
- Other names: Jean Burk; Mamie Stover; Jean Noriger
- Occupations: Prostitute, Brothel madam
- Years active: 1930-1944
- Notable work: My Life as a Honolulu Prostitute

Betty Jean O'Hara (1913 in Chicago, Illinois – 1973) was a famed prostitute in Honolulu's "vice district" during World War II.

== Biography ==
Born in Chicago, Illinois, she was the only child of strict Catholic parents. Her father was a medical doctor. She received a good education. When O'Hara was 17, she went to a party and met another girl who was sporting expensive jewelry. The girl's boyfriend was a pimp and introduced O'Hara to prostitution so she could also have jewellery. Initially she worked in Chicago, but later moved around the US mainland. Police records show that between 1934 and 1938 O'Hara had been arrested for prostitution three times. In June 1934, using the name "Jean Burk" she was arrested in Chicago. In 1937 she was banned from LaSalle County by the county court in Ottawa, Illinois. Finally she was banned from Monterey County, California, for two years and given a suspended 90 day prison sentence in April 1938.

O'Hara was probably working in a high-class brothel in San Francisco when she was recruited to work in Honolulu.

== Hawaii ==
When Honolulu madams needed new prostitutes, they sent a "mail order" to agents, usually in San Francisco, to recruit them and arrange transport to Hawaii. The steamers were met by a detective. O'Hara and the other women were taken to the Blaisdell Hotel on Fort Street, explained the "10 commandments" for prostitutes and told any infraction would lead to them being removed from the islands. They were then taken to the police station, where they were fingerprinted and photographed. From there she was taken to the brothel where she was to work in Hotel Street.

After a few months she had saved a considerable sum. She decided to live outside the red-light district and rented a house near Waikiki Beach with her friend Betty. After the vice squad objected as prostitutes were not supposed to live outside the red-light district, the two women moved to the Pacific Heights area. After the vice squad again objected, O'Hara and Betty went to Kauai and worked in one of the three brothels there, which serviced mainly plantation workers. After a few months on Kauai, they worked on Maui island for a while before returning to Honolulu in 1939.

On her return to Honolulu, O'Hara was beaten up by the police and charged with assault and battery on a police office by the officer concerned. She filed a case against the policeman and the chief of police. The resulting publicity resulted in the charges being dropped. This successful standing up to the vice squad was the start of the squad losing its hold over the red-light district.

With some money behind her, O'Hara set herself up as a madam.

After the attack on Pearl Harbor, people were fearful of further bombings. People were keen to sell their property and O'Hara bought up several properties which subsequently made her very wealthy. Immediately after the attack, many of the brothels were turned over to quarters for the wounded. With the brothels occupied and the authorities distracted, the prostitutes started working outside the district. O'Hara started working from the luxury Moana Hotel with two other women. Following complaints about noise, O'Hara was arrested. As the military had now taken control of the red-light district and prostitution, she was tried by a military court and sentenced to 6 months.

On her release she returned to her brothel. which was on Hotel Street. By this time the military had set a fixed price for prostitute's services. O'Hara is credited with inventing the "bull pen" system where a single prostitute would work three rooms in rotation: In one room a man would be undressing, in a second room the prostitute would be having sex, and in the third room the man would be dressing. With price controls circumventing the laws of supply and demand, O'Hara's system sped up the process and allowed each prostitute to see many more 'johns' every day.

In 1944 O'Hara was charged with trying to murder the husband of a fellow prostitute. The trial attracted much publicity and the jury only took 5 minutes to acquit O'Hara. After the trial she quit the sex industry.

After martial law ended in 1944, partly because of O'Hara's notoriety, the red-light district was shut down.

In 1944, O'Hara's published her memoirs as My Life as a Honolulu Prostitute. The book was later re-published under the title Honolulu Harlot. The 1956 Jane Russell film, The Revolt of Mamie Stover was based on O'Hara's life in Honolulu (Mamie Stover was an alias O'Hara used).

O'Hara had married a 'local boy' named Norager. Years later she tried to kill him in San Francisco by ramming him against a tree with her car. O'Hara died in 1973.

== Bibliography ==
- Bailey, Beth; Farber, David (2012). The First Strange Place: The Alchemy of Race and Sex in World War II Hawaii. Simon and Schuster. ISBN 9781476727523.
- Leder, Jane Mersky (2006). Thanks for the Memories: Love, Sex, and World War II. Greenwood Publishing Group. ISBN 9780275988791.
- Sannella, Roy (2005). My Nine Lives: This Is My Life. iUniverse. ISBN 9780595336753.
