= Henrietta (ship) =

Schooner Yacht

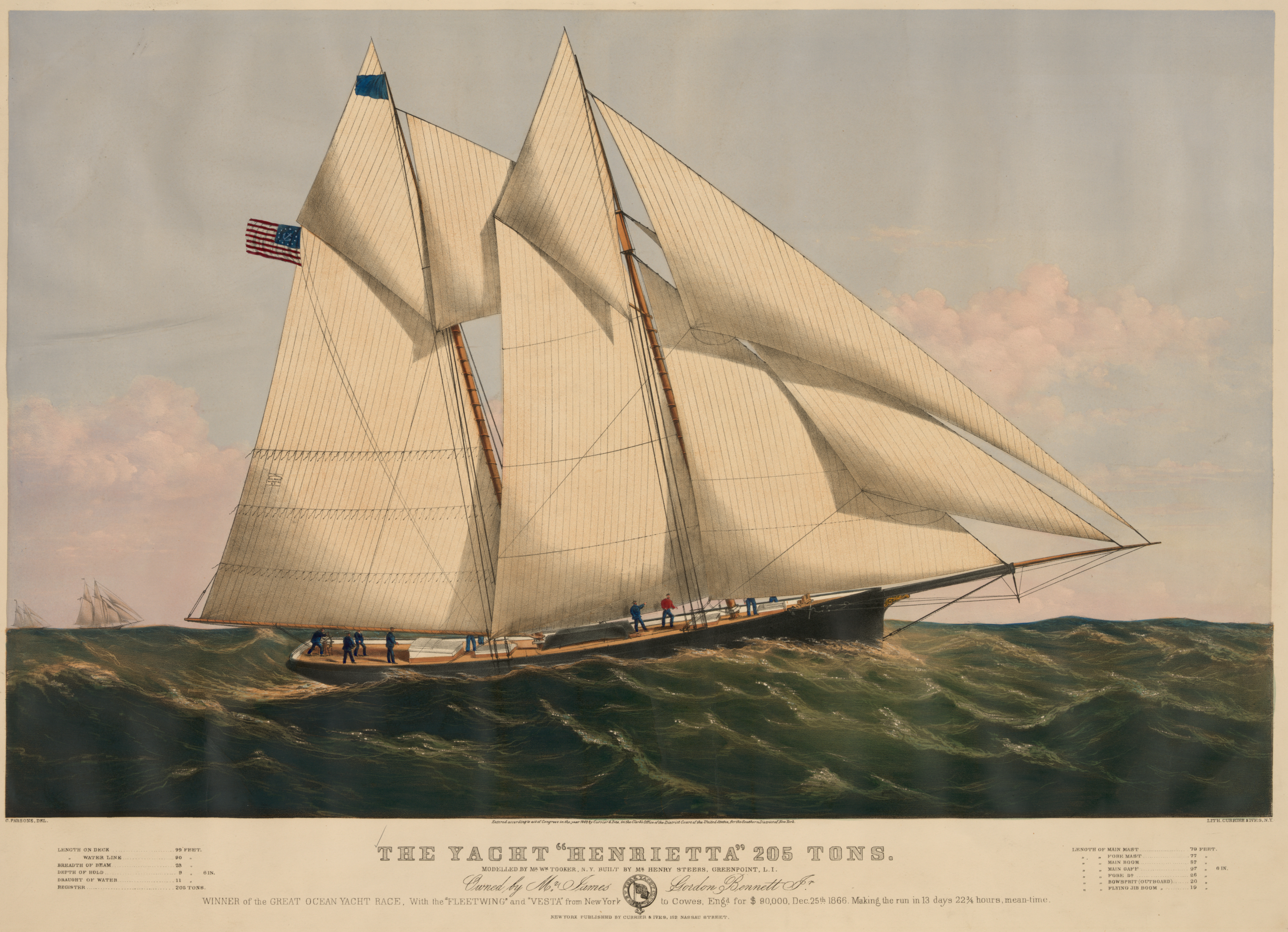
- Schooner Yacht Henrietta

History

United States
- Name: Henrietta
- Owner: James Gordon Bennett Jr.; United States Navy (1861-1865)
- Operator: James Gordon Bennett Jr.; Samuel S. Samuels
- Builder: Henry Steers
- Launched: May 18, 1861
- Commissioned: 1861
- Decommissioned: 1862
- Out of service: Sold in 1870
- Fate: Sank in December 16, 1872

General characteristics
- Class & type: Schooner
- Type: keel yacht
- Displacement: 205 tonnage by custom-house measurement
- Length: 107 ft 0 in (32.61 m) on deck
- Beam: 23 ft 0 in (7.01 m)
- Draught: 9 ft 0 in (2.74 m)
- Depth: 10 ft 0 in (3.05 m)
- Propulsion: schooner sail
- Crew: 16 men
- Armament: one 24-pound Dahlgren gun

Henrietta was a 19th-century wooden yacht schooner, designed and built in 1861 by Henry Steers for James Gordon Bennett Jr. She was acquired by the Union Navy during the American Civil War. She was placed into the U.S. Revenue Service assigned to support the fleet blockading the ports of the Confederate States of America. The Henrietta won the first mid-winter transatlantic yacht race across the Atlantic between three American yachts.

== Construction and service ==
Schooner Yacht Henrietta was launched from the shipyard of Henry Steers at Greenpoint, Brooklyn on May 18, 1861. She was designed and built by Henry Steers for James Gordon Bennett Jr. as a pleasure yacht. She was modelled by William Tooker as a keel yacht of 205 tons.

== Purchased by US Navy ==
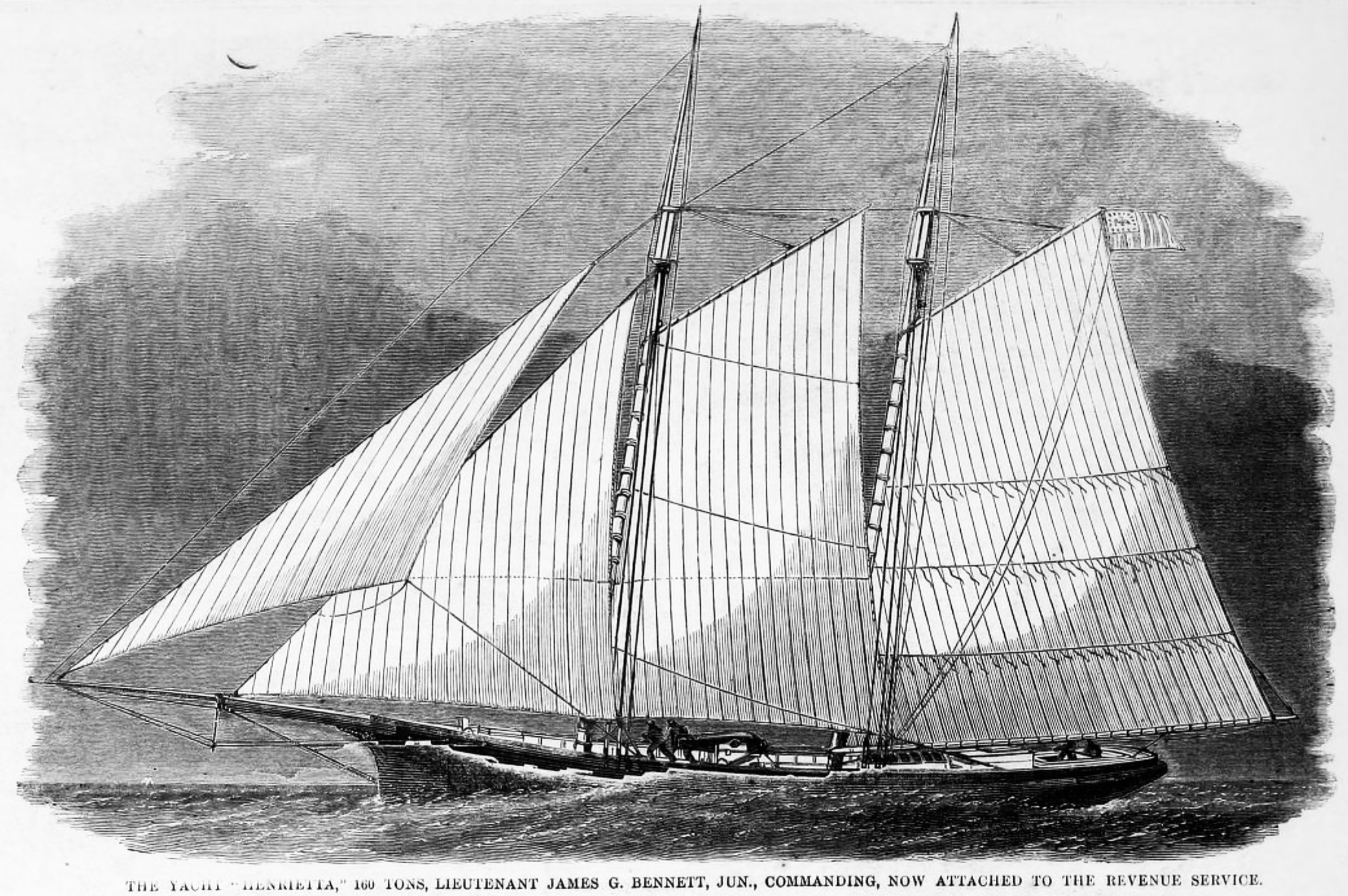
Yacht Henrietta attached to the Revenue Service.

In 1861, Bennett volunteered his newly built yacht Henrietta for the U.S. Revenue Marine Service during the Civil War. At the same time, Bennett was commissioned as a third lieutenant in the Revenue Marine Service and assigned to the U.S. Henrietta. She patrolled Long Island looking for rebels until February 1862 when she was sent to Port Royal, South Carolina. She carried a 24-pound Dahlgren gun with 16 men. On March 3, 1862, Bennett commanded the Henrietta as part of the fleet which captured Fernandina, Florida and raised the American flag. Bennett and the Henrietta was decommissioned and returned to civilian life in New York in May 1862.

In September 1865, the Henrietta lost to the yacht Fleetwing in a race around Cape May Lightship by 1 hour and 19 minutes. In October 1865, she was defeated by the Vesta over the same course.

== Transatlantic race ==
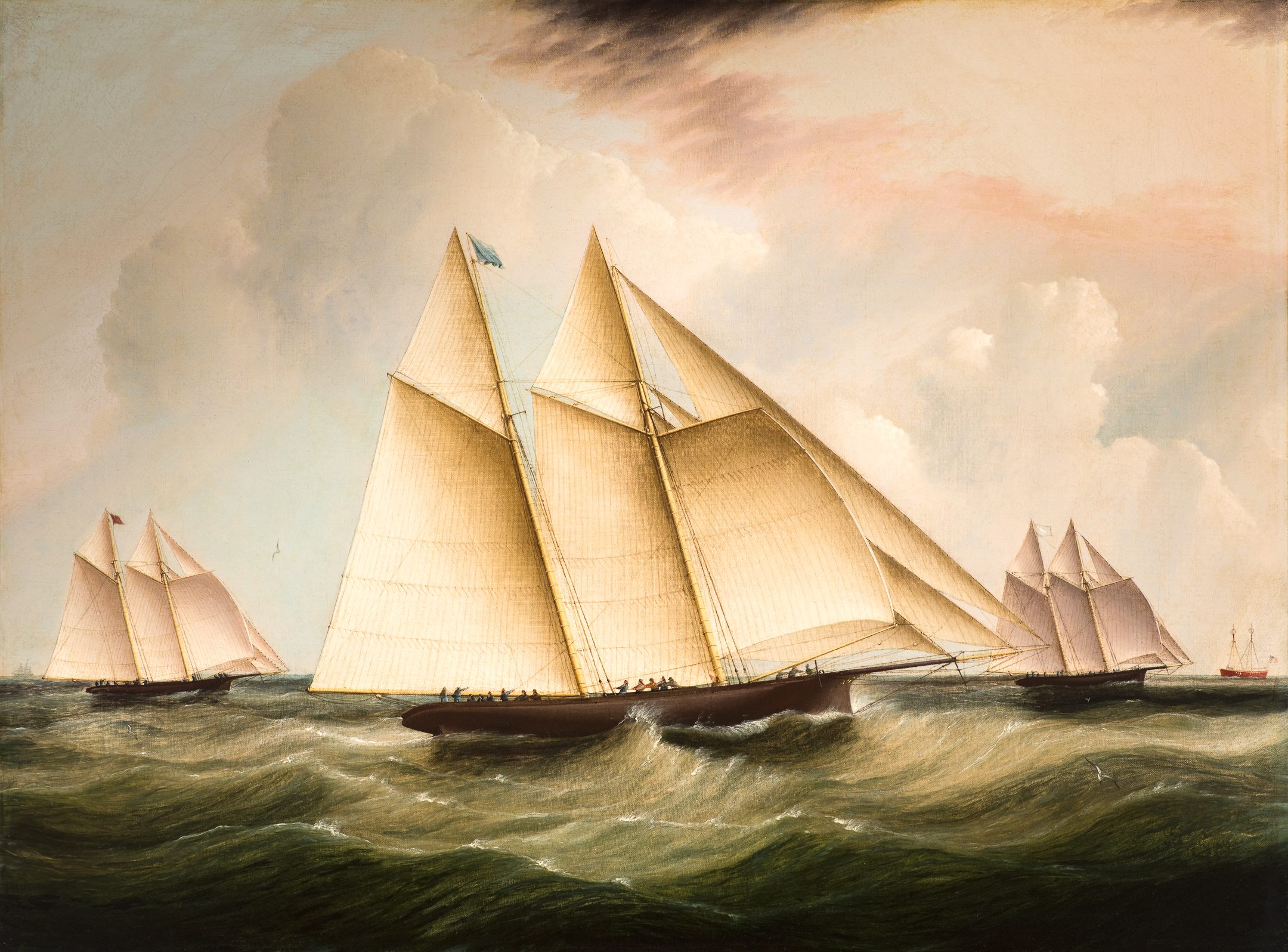
The 1866 Transatlantic Yacht Race with Fleetwing, Henrietta, and Vesta by James E. Buttersworth.

In what was billed as the "Great Ocean Yacht Race", when three wealthy American men took their yachts on a mid-winter transatlantic race across the Atlantic in December 1866. The three yachts were the Vesta owned by Pierre Lorillard IV, the Fleetwing owned by George and Franklin Osgood and the Henrietta owned by the 21-year-old yachtsman James Gordon Bennett Jr. Each yachtsman put up $30,000 in the winner-take-all wager. They started from Sandy Hook Light, during high westerly winds and raced to The Needles, the furthest westerly point of the Isle of Wight in the English Channel, before reaching the seaport Cowes on the Isle of Wight. Bennett's Henrietta won with a time of 13 days, 21 hours, 55 minutes, with Captain Samuel S. Samuels as the skipper. The Fleetwing and Vesta took over 14 days to reach Cowes. After his win, Bennett bought the rival yacht, the Fleetwing, for $65,000 and named her the Dauntless.

After the race, on January 1, 1867, Commodore McVickar of the New York Yacht Club and Mr. Bennett, of the Henrietta had a personal meeting with Queen Victoria at Osborne House.

== End of service ==
In 1870, the Henrietta was sold for $16,000 to Captain Nickerson of Boston for fruit trade in West Indies. She was later sold again and used in the African trade and then transferred to New Orleans and the Bay Island Fruit company.

On December 16, 1872, the Henrietta was lost off the coast of Roatán, Honduras on her return voyage to New York during a heavy gale. Her crew were saved.
