= Vincent Steer =

- Born: 1888
- Occupation: compositor
- Known for: founder of the British Typographers' Guild; author of Printing Design and Layout

Vincent Steer (born 1888; death date unknown) was a compositor noted for founding the British Typographers' Guild and for his book on typography (Printing Design and Layout), which was known as the "Typographer's Bible".

== Biography ==
In 1911, Steer studied at the Camberwell School of Arts and Crafts, where he first became interested in typography.

Steer served in the army during World War I, briefly emigrated to Canada, then returned to England and worked with type-founders Stephenson Blake before moving to Spottiswoode Ballantyne [& Co.]

In 1928, Steer, with six other like-minded friends, met in a Sicilian restaurant in Holborn and founded the British Typographers' Guild (BTG) with the original purpose "to bring together in friendship and mutual help, all those with a love of the printed word". He served as the first President of the guild, and was re-elected to serve as president for its second year. He retired from the guild in 1945.

In 1934, Steer wrote Printing Design and Layout with a foreword by Beatrice Warde. This book was referred to as "A Complete Course in Typography", received praise from Francis Meynell, and was known as the "Typographer's Bible". Three subsequent editions were published: the second in 1945 (and reprinted 1947); the third in 1952; the fourth and final in 1958 (and reprinted in 1960). In total, 18,000 copies were sold.

== Vincent Steer Award ==
The International Society of Typographic Designers, which evolved from the guild that Steer founded, has an annual Student Assessment Scheme whose single most outstanding submission is awarded the Vincent Steer Award, named in his honour.
