= Henry Steers (1832) =

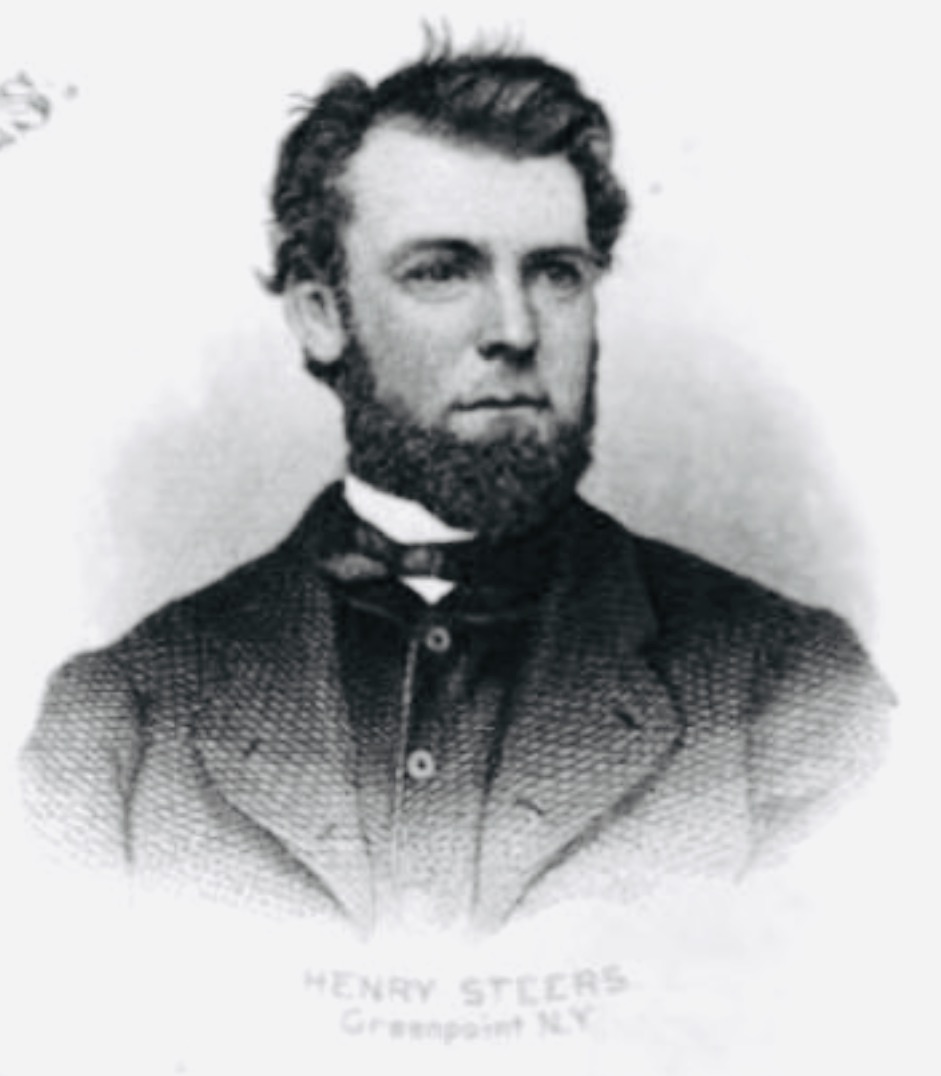
- Born: September 14, 1832; New York City, U.S.
- Died: September 29, 1903 (aged 71); Westport, Massachusetts, U.S.
- Occupation: shipbuilder

Henry Steers (September 14, 1832 in New York City – September 29, 1903 in Westport, Massachusetts) was the son of James Rich Steers, nephew of George Steers, proprietor of Henry Steers' Ship Yard (George & James R. Steers).

== Education ==
He was educated in New-York with admission into a free Academy. At the age of 16, he worked in the ship yard of his father and uncle, at George & James R. Steers. He served as a regular apprenticeship and moved from a grindstone boy to a foreman.

== Henry Steers' shipyard ==
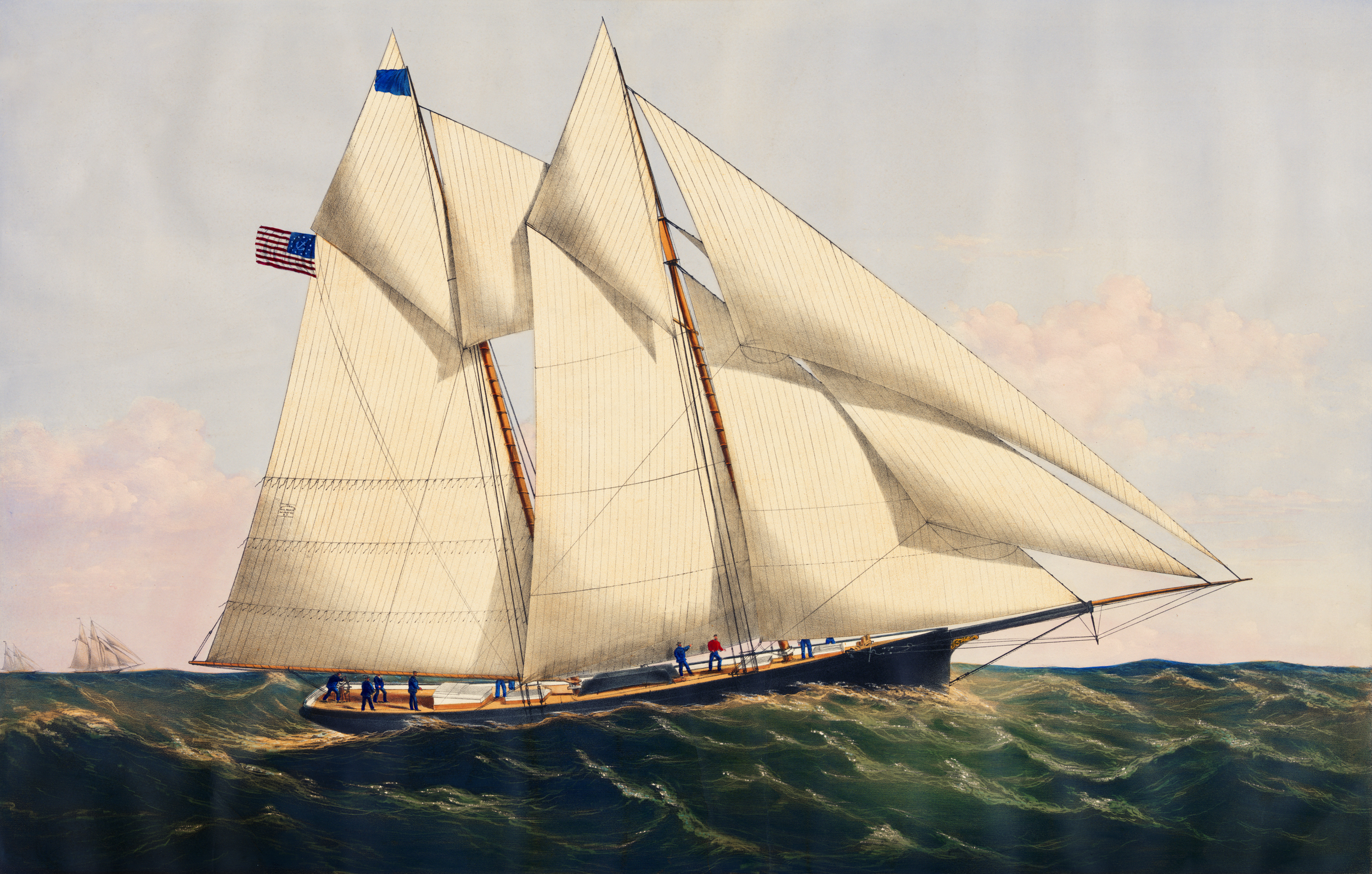
Yacht Henrietta, 1861.

In 1857, Steers started his shipyard in Greenpoint, Brooklyn, on the East River opposite New York City. The shipyard was between Green and Huron Streets. He designed and built most of the boats of the Pacific Mail Steamship Company. He built several yachts and pilot boats.

Since the Henry Steers' shipyard was close to the East River, it was used to launch boats like the 84-ton, side-wheel steamer Seth Grosvenor in September 1859.

By 1885, Steers was president of the Dry Dock Bank, which later became the Eleventh Ward Bank of New York.

== Death ==
Steers died on Sep 23, 1903 (aged 71) in Westport, Massachusetts when he drowned while fishing. He is buried at the Green-Wood Cemetery.

== List of built ships ==
- 1860: Charles H. Marshall, New York Pilot Boat, No. 3
- 1859: Hu Quang, Che Kiang and Foh Kein (which was at the time the fastest boat in China waters)
- 1861: Henrietta 150-ton yacht
- 1861: Hope, New York Pilot Boat built for Thomas F. Ives.
- 1862: Charles H. Marshall, No. 3 built by Henry Steers
- 1865: SS Arizona January 19, 1865 for the Pacific Mail Steamship Company
- 1865: Nicaragua built by Steers for the Central American Transit Company
- 1866: Idaho steam sloop for the U. S. Government
- 1866: Francis Perkins (pilot boat) for the N. Y. Pilots
- 1867: SS Great Republic for Pacific Mail Steamship Company
- 1867: Gussie modelled by Steers, a 25-ton 50 foot yacht
- 1869: SS America for the Pacific Mail Steamship Company
- 1877: Massachusetts built for the New York and Providence Line

In March 1873, Henry Steers rebuilt the schooner-yacht Idler at his shipyard in Greenpoint. She was lengthened eight feet and her topmasts were increased to carry more sail.

== See also ==
- List of Northeastern U. S. Pilot Boats
- List of large sailing yachts
- List of sailboat designers and manufacturers
