= Frank Steer =

American centenarian

Frank Steer (January 12, 1901 – March 7, 2006) was, at age 105, one of the last surviving American veterans of the First World War. Steer joined the United States Army at age 17 in 1918. He was sent to France in July 1918, and served on the Western Front against the Germans. Steer saw action at the battle of the Meuse-Argonne Offensive. After the war, he stayed in the army and served in the Second World War as a major appointed Provost Marshal of Hawaii during its period under martial law. Among his duties was the oversight of the prostitutes who serviced visiting soldiers and sailors. Steer eventually retired from service in 1945 as a colonel after serving 27 years. He served in both world wars and was therefore an honorary soldier of the United States Army. In 1959, Steer moved to Hawaii after it had become a part of the Union, and lived there for the rest of his life. He died at age 105.

== See also ==
Colonel William Frank Steer retired in 1950 after serving 32 years in military service. A graduate of the West Point Academy, his last tour of duty station was the Pentagon building as the United States Air Force Provost Marshal.
