= James Rich Steers =

American yacht builder and politician

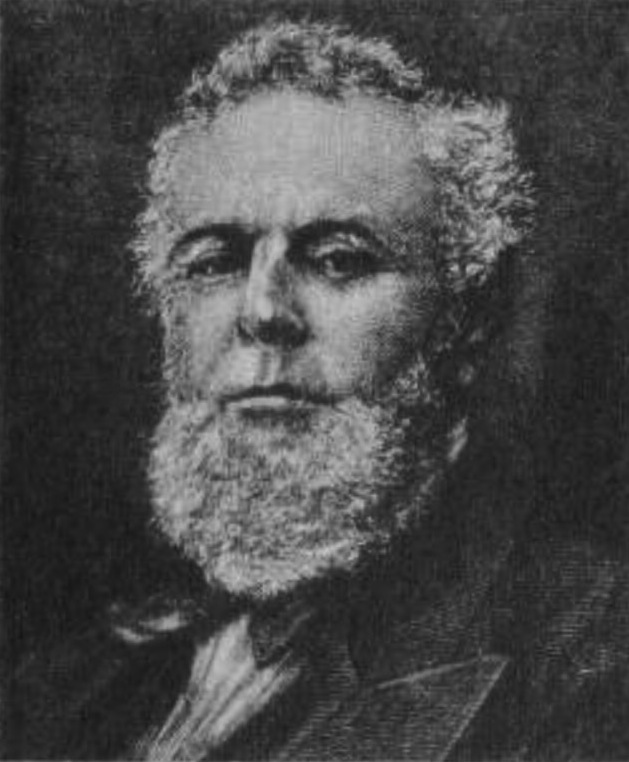
- James R. Steers (1808–1896)
- Born: October 15, 1808; Plymouth, England
- Died: April 16, 1896 (aged 87); New York City, US
- Occupation: shipbuilder

James Rich Steers (October 15, 1808 – April 16, 1896) was an American yacht builder and politician. He founded the George Steers and Co shipyard with his brother, George Steers.

== Career ==
Steers was born in Plymouth, England. His father, Henry Steers, was connected to the Construction Department of the Royal Naval Dockyards at Plymouth until 1815. He moved the family to the United States in 1817, including James and brother George Steers (1819-1856). In 1826 Steers was involved with his father in partially successful efforts to recover items from the sunken British cruiser HMS Hussar in the Hell Gate area of New York Harbor. In 1830 he became superintendent of the ship building firm Smith & Dimon.

Beginning work under his father on the 500 ton steamer Governor Walcott, Steers soon became a shipbuilder in his own right. Between 1841 and 1850, he built many yachts well known in their day. These include, the Edwin Forest (1841), Three Brothers, Miller's Damsel, and the Huzzar. In 1842, he and his brother built the yacht Martin Van Buren.

In 1850, he and his brother formed the firm George & James R. Steers, with shipyards at the foot of East Twelfth Street, where the yacht America was built for John C. Stevens, Edward A. Stevens, George Schuyler, Hamilton Wilkes, and J. Beekman Finley.

Steers retired from active business in 1857, having amassed a considerable fortune and passed the business on to his son Henry Steers. He was an active Mason, a Democrat, one time alderman of the Eleventh Ward, and later a Police Justice.

From 1829 until its absorption into the Metropolitan Fire District in 1865, he was active in the Live Oak No. 44 volunteer fire company founded by Jacob Bell, which operated out of quarters at the far east end of Houston Street near the waterfront and included many prominent shipbuilders among its members. Steers served a term as foreman of the company and was believed to be its last surviving member at his death.

== Personal ==
Steers was twice married. With his first wife, Francis E. Hunt, he had four children: Henry Steers, James Rich Steers Jr. (the founder of J. Rich Steers, Inc.), Daniel Steers, and Mrs. Frederick E. Baker. After Francine's death in 1870, Steers married Marion E. Walters in 1878.

Steers' death on April 16, 1896, age 88, was attributed to "an attack of acute indigestion". His funeral took place at the Trinity Protestant Episcopal Chapel in New York City. He was buried at the Green-Wood Cemetery in Brooklyn.

== See also ==
- List of Northeastern U. S. Pilot Boats
- List of large sailing yachts
- List of sailboat designers and manufacturers
