= Henry Steers =

American shipbuilder

- Born: 1779; Dartmouth, England
- Died: 1850 (aged 70–71); New York City, U.S.
- Occupation: shipbuilder
- Spouse: Ann Rich
- Children: 13

Henry Steers (1779 in Dartmouth, England – 1850 in New York, US) was an nineteenth-century American shipbuilder, and the ancestor of a line of important businessmen in various boatbuilding and maritime construction concerns.

== Early life ==
Steer was born in Dartmouth, England, in 1779. Steers married Ann Rich on December 2, 1803, and they had thirteen children together, including a daughter Ann Steer, who remained in England, and a son Henry Torring Steer. At some point, Henry began to spell the surname "Steers" and that usage has continued in the family to this day.

== Career ==
Steers apprenticed for 7 years for Newman of New Quay to learn his trade. He was afterwards connected with the Construction Department of the Royal Naval Dockyards at Plymouth till 1815.

Two of Henry's sons, James and George, followed in the business and later became well known for building many ships in Greenpoint, Long Island, and New York City.

=== Isle of Guernsey ===
After his work in Plymouth, Steers moved to the Isle of Guernsey, and built two privateers for the French government there. His friend John Thomas had gone to the United States and obtained a position in the Washington Navy yard, and he wrote to Steers to join him there. Steers accepted the invitation.

=== Washington ===
He relocated with his family to New York in 1817, and from there to Washington, D.C., where he was engaged in the Construction Department of the United States Navy. The July 1, 1823, Washington Navy Yard payroll records for the Dry Dock Department document Steers was employed at the navy yard as a Quarterman Carpenter, pay rate $1.76 per day. Sharp John, Washington Navy Yard Boat Builder and Dry Dock Department 1823. Steers showed the commodore of the navy yard the plans from which he had constructed the cruisers for the French government, and obtained from the authorities an order to build two war vessels – the Shark and the Grampus after the same model, and also drew plans for the frigate Brandywine. Steers and Thomas also furnished plans for the construction of an immense ship house and an inclined plane by means of which they were successful in hauling up the frigate Congress for repairs.

=== New York ===
In 1824 the two ship builders came to New York and built, at the foot of Tenth Street on the East River, the first ship railway ever seen in the United States. It consisted of rails laid on an inclined plane upon which a cradle was run for the purpose of drawing vessels up and out of the water in order to repair them. In consideration of their enterprise, the Legislature granted to the railway company a charter for a bank to last "as long as grass grows and water runs". This resulted in the founding of the Dry Dock Bank, later known as the Eleventh Ward Bank. The only other institution that ever received such a charter was the Manhattan Company. James Rich Steers had been a stockholder in that bank more than fifty years.

With his son, James Rich Steers, they re-built the sloop of war Peacock in 1828. In 1829, his son became superintendent of the shipbuilding firm of Smith & Demon.

== Death ==
Steers died on March 28, 1850, at a New York State Asylum in New York City. His obituary said that he was a "ship builder and a man of respectability and talent."
