= Edward Everett Hayden =

American naval officer, inventor and meteorologist

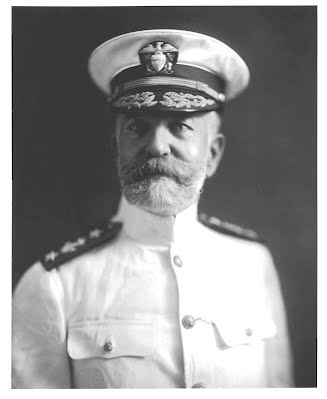
- Born: April 14, 1858; Boston, Massachusetts
- Died: November 17, 1932 (aged 74); Washington DC
- Education: U.S. Naval Academy
- Occupation(s): inventor, meteorologist, naval officer
- Employer(s): US Navy, U.S. Geological Survey, Smithsonian Institution
- Known for: Co-founding the National Geographic Society

Edward Everett Hayden (April 14, 1858 – November 17, 1932) was an American naval officer, inventor and meteorologist. He was born in Boston, and was a lifelong naval officer. Early on he was associated with the Smithsonian and the US Geological Survey, but after losing a leg he turned to meteorology. He was considered an expert in sea storms, and wrote many articles about them. In 1888 he helped co-found the National Geographic Society, and served as its vice-president from 1890 until 1893.
