= United States Mail Ship =

Seagoing vessels that carry mail under contract with the United States Postal Service

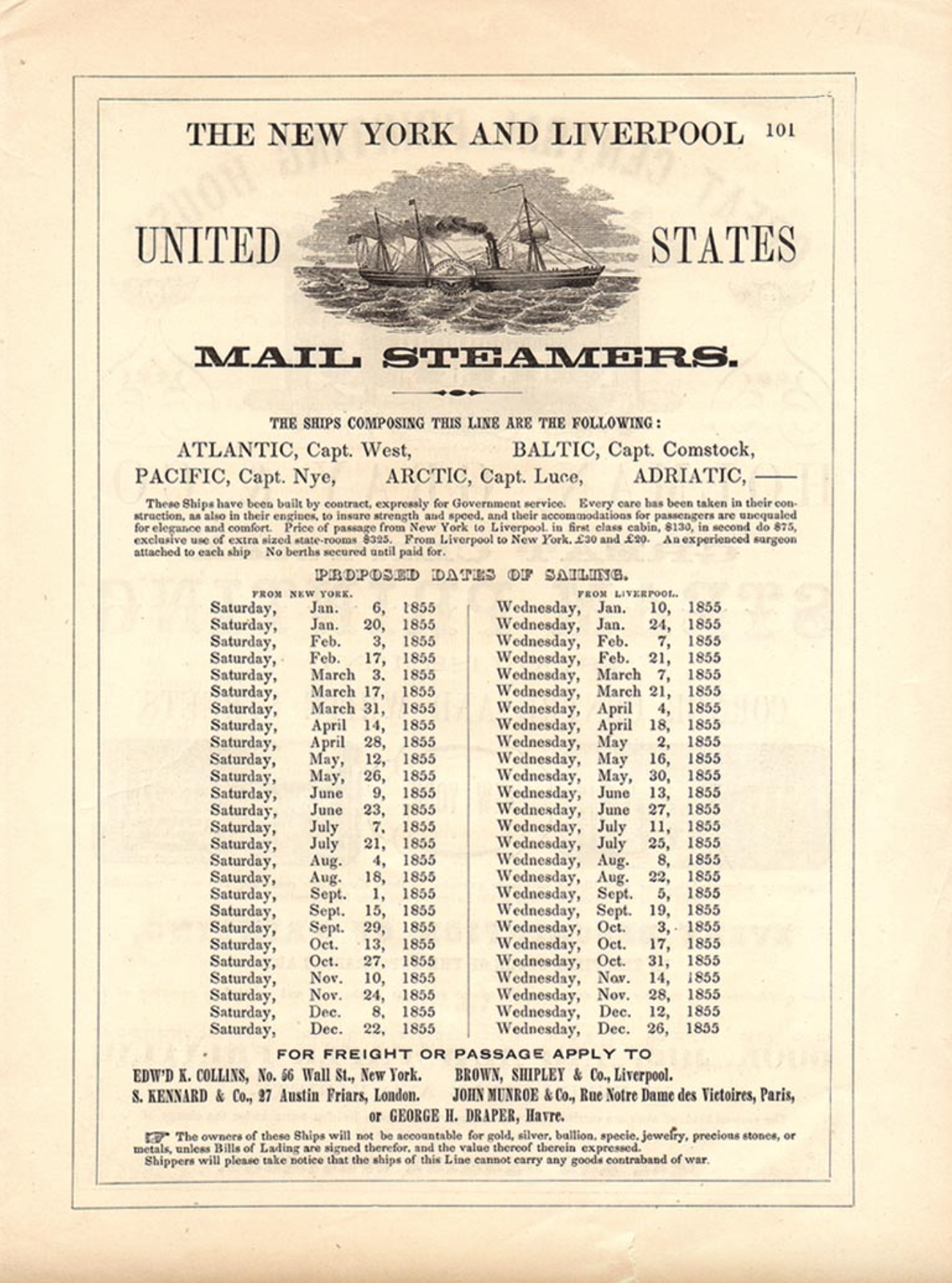
1855 sailing schedule for the Collins Line

United States Mail Ship, usually abbreviated to USMS or USM, is a ship prefix used for seagoing vessels that carry mail under contract with the United States Postal Service.

It was used sporadically by many shipping lines, but is often associated in particular with the U.S. Mail Steamship Company, Collins Line, and American Line which held a number of high-profile mail contracts, and traditionally prefixed the names of many of their ships with the initials "USM" or "USMS".

== List of past United States Mail Ships ==
This is an incomplete list, you can help by expanding it.

Name	Line	In service	Left service	Status
Adriatic	Collins	—	—	—
Arctic	Collins	—	—	—
Atlantic	Collins	1849	1858	
Baltic	Collins	1850	—	—
Cherokee	Baxter	—	—	
Columbia	—	—	—	—
Cumbria	—	—	—	—
Emily B. Souder	—	—	—	—
Falcon	—	—	—	—
Georgia	—	—	—	
Hermann	—	—	—	
Morning Star	—	—	—	—
New York	American	1893	1923	Built in 1888 at Glasgow by J. G. Thomson Co. as the City of New York for the Inman Line. Taken over by the American Line 1893, renamed "New York", scrapped 1923
Pacific	—	—	—	
Parkersburg	—	—	—	—
Roanoke	—	—	—	—
Southerner	—	—	—	
State of Georgia	Alex Heron Jr, & Co	—	—	—

== See also ==
- Royal Mail Ship
