= RMS Persia =

British steamship built in 1856

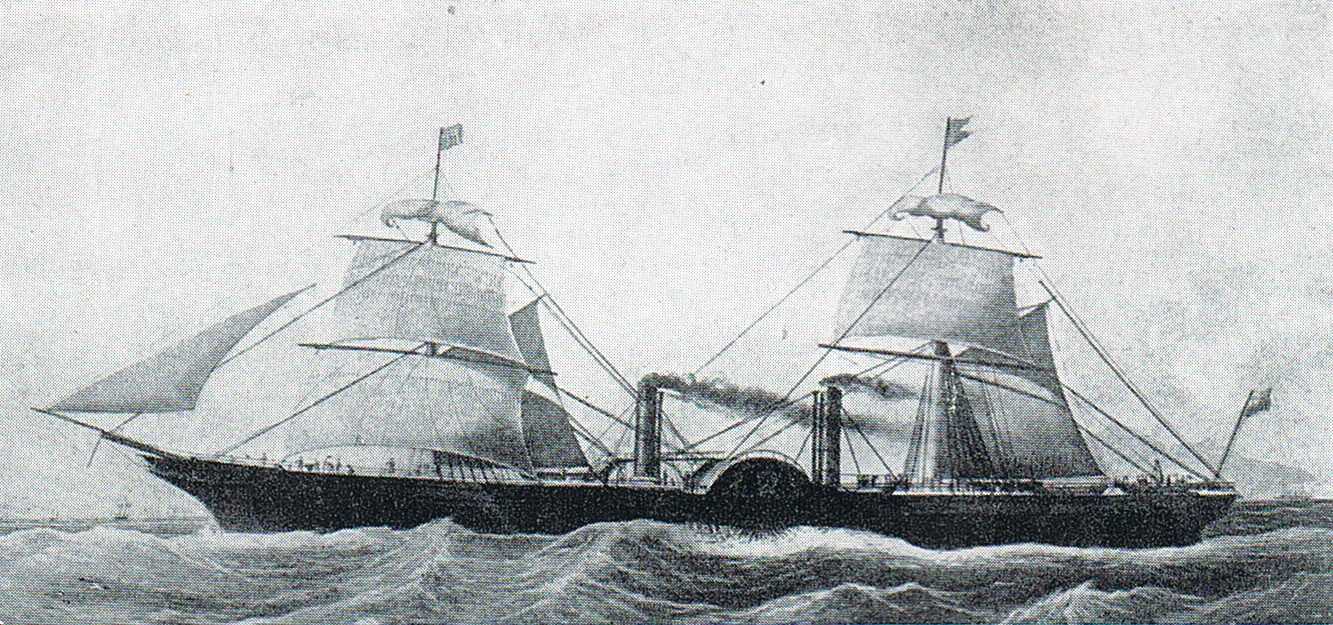
- Cunard's Persia of 1856

History

United Kingdom
- Name: Persia
- Namesake: Persia
- Owner: Cunard Line
- Route: Atlantic crossing.
- Builder: Robert Napier and Sons, Glasgow
- Launched: 25 July 1855
- Maiden voyage: 26 January 1856
- Fate: Taken out of service 1868, scrapped 1872

General characteristics
- Type: Steamship
- Tonnage: 3,414 GRT
- Length: 398 ft (121 m)
- Beam: 45 ft (14 m)
- Installed power: 1 × 2-cylinder side-lever steam engine with 100 inch bore and 10 ft stroke
- Sail plan: 2 masts
- Capacity: Approximately 250 saloon and 50 second class passengers

Persia was a British passenger liner operated by the Cunard Line that won the Blue Riband in 1856 for the fastest westbound transatlantic voyage. She was the first Atlantic record breaker constructed of iron and was the largest ship in the world at the time of her launch. However, the inefficiencies of paddle wheel propulsion rendered Persia obsolete, and she was taken out of service in 1868 after only twelve years. Attempts to convert Persia to sail were unsuccessful, and the former pride of the British merchant marine was scrapped in 1872.

== Development and design ==
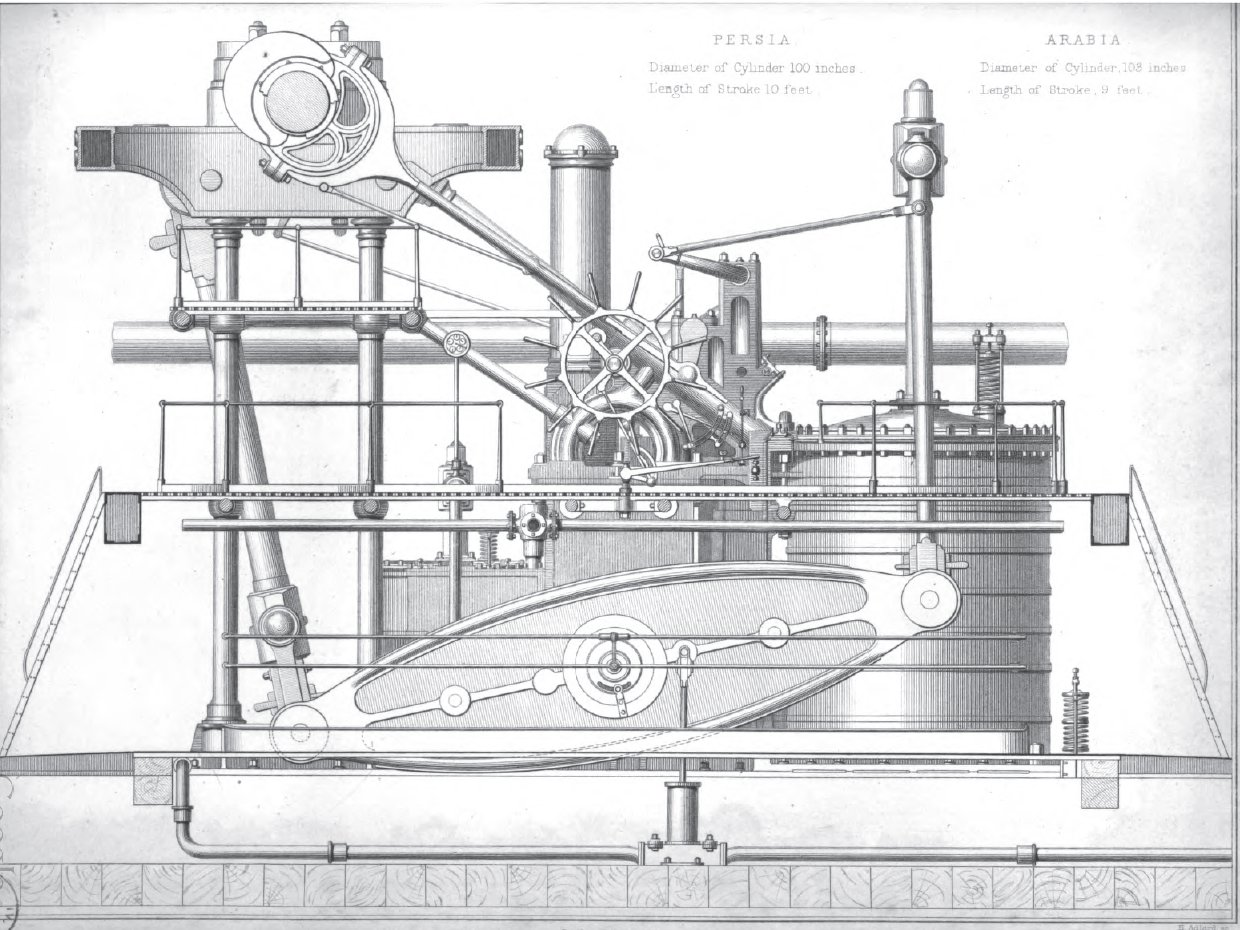
Side lever engine of Persia

As a result of competition from the Collins Line, Cunard ordered the Arabia in 1852 to retake the Atlantic records. Arabia crammed more powerful engines into a smaller ship than the Collins speedsters, and touched 15 knots on trials. However, she proved too powerful for her wooden construction and was unable to win the records. Cunard realized that in the future, new construction must include an iron hull.

For Persia, Robert Napier and Sons of Glasgow designed an iron ship that was 16% larger than the wooden Collins liners and 50% larger than Cunard's Arabia. Her two-cylinder side-lever engine produced 3,600 horsepower (2,700 kW) and consumed 145 long tons (147 t) of coal per day. Persia's launch in July 1855 was a national event and she touched 17 knots (31 km/h) on her trials, although her normal service speed was limited to 13 knots (24 km/h) because of her high fuel consumption. She carried 250 first class and 50 second class passengers.

== Service history ==
On her maiden voyage in 1856, Persia struck an iceberg, but was saved by her clipper bow and the stoutness of her construction. It was during this maiden voyage that the Collins Line steamer Pacific disappeared, possibly itself a victim of icebergs. In April, she took the Atlantic speed records in both directions with an eastbound voyage of 9 days, 10 hours, 22 minutes (13.46 knots (24.93 km/h)) and a westbound voyage of 9 days, 16 hours, 16 minutes (13.11 knots (24.28 km/h)). She held both records until 1863 when Cunard commissioned the Scotia, the last paddle wheel Atlantic record holder. Scotia was originally intended to be Persia's sister, but was delayed when the Collins Line collapsed. When Scotia was finally built, she was a larger edition of Persia with an extra deck and power.

In 1861, during the Trent incident, Persia and several other liners were chartered to rush troops to Canada. She was the only ship to reach Quebec before ice closed the St. Lawrence River. The next year, Cunard commissioned the SS China, its first mail liner with screw propulsion. She proved substantially more profitable than Cunard's mail paddle steamers and the firm quickly ordered two additional screw mail ships to retire the last wooden paddle steamers on the New York express route.

Persia remained paired with Scotia on the New York route until 1867 when Cunard commissioned the Russia, the first screw Cunarder that could match Scotia's speed. Because of her fuel consumption, Persia was not a good fit for the other Cunard services and was laid up in 1868. Her engines were removed and she was sold to MacArthur and Wilson of Glasgow for conversion to sail. However, the conversion didn't take place and Persia was sold for scrap in 1872.

Records
Preceded by Baltic	Holder of the Blue Riband (Westbound record); 1856–1863	Succeeded by Scotia
Preceded by Arctic	Blue Riband (Eastbound record); 1856–1863	Succeeded by Scotia
