= Red Jacket (clipper) =

American clipper ship, launched in 1853

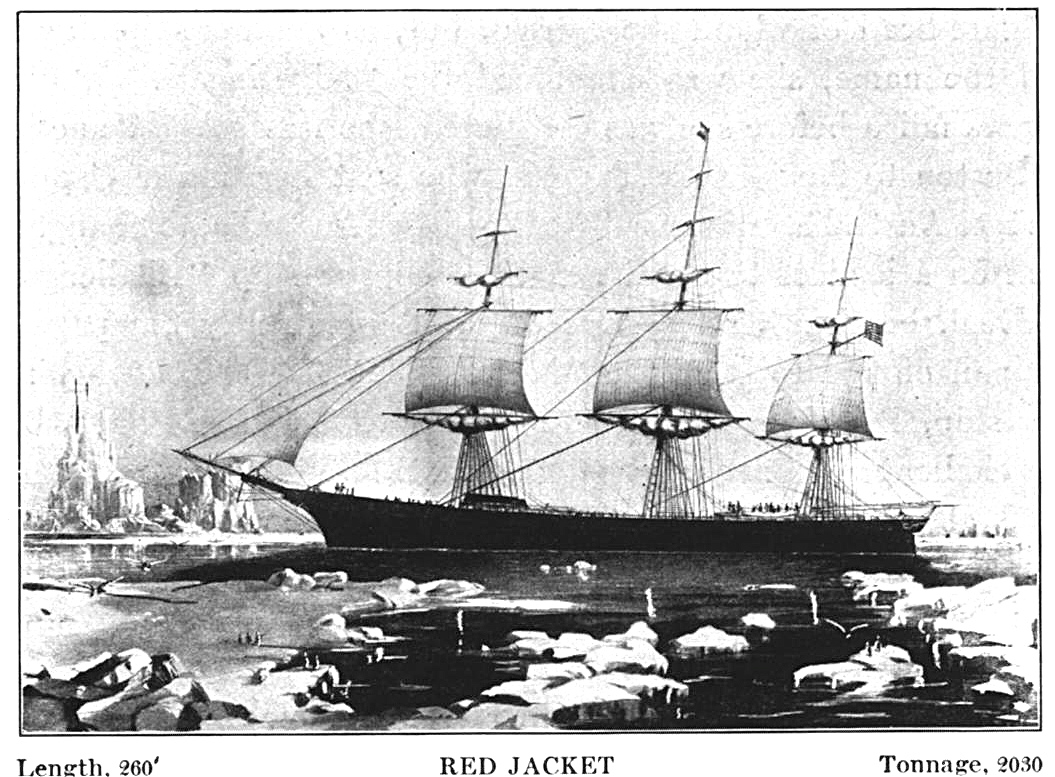

History

United States
- Name: Red Jacket
- Owner: Seccomb & Taylor, Boston
- Ordered: 30 December 1852
- Builder: George Thomas, Rockland, ME
- Cost: 50,000$
- Laid down: 6 March 1853
- Launched: 2 Nov 1853
- Acquired: 3 November 1853
- In service: 3 November 1853 - 28 July 1855
- Out of service: 28 July 1853
- Renamed: Red Clipper
- Fate: Sold as scrap after running aground
- Notes: made 2 meters longer.

United Kingdom
- Name: Red Clipper
- Owner: Pilkington & Wilson
- Cost: £30,000
- Acquired: 1855
- In service: 1 August 1854 - 9 January 1864
- Out of service: 9 January 1864
- Renamed: Red Sea
- Fate: Sold
- Notes: In the immigrant trade; became an Australian and Indian coastal freighter, 1861.
- Name: Red sea
- Owner: Wilson & Chambers, Liverpool, 1868
- Cost: 60,000$
- Acquired: 12 January 1865
- In service: 12 January - 4 September 1866
- Out of service: 4 September 1866
- Renamed: Oceano Vermelho
- Fate: Sold

Portugal
- Name: Oceano Vermelho
- Owner: Blandy Brothers, Madeira Islands
- Acquired: 7 September 1866
- In service: 7 September 1866 - 18 October 1882
- Out of service: 18 October 1882
- Fate: Driven ashore in a gale, 1882.
- Notes: Hulked, became a coal barge in Madeira.

General characteristics
- Class & type: Clipper, designed by Samuel Hartt Pook
- Tons burthen: 2305 tons
- Length: 251 ft. 2 in.
- Beam: 44 ft.
- Depth of hold: 31 ft.
- Propulsion: sails
- Sail plan: full-rigged ship

Red Jacket was a clipper ship, one of the largest and fastest ever built. She was named after Sagoyewatha, a famous Seneca Indian chief, called "Red Jacket" by settlers. She was designed by Samuel Hartt Pook, built by George Thomas in Rockland, Maine, and launched in 1853, the last ship to be launched from this yard.

By the 1850s, she belonged to the Pilkington & Wilson shipping firm – which was called the White Star Line – which traded between Liverpool and Australia. The ship's figurehead, one of the Seneca chief with a five-point white star on his chest, became the inspiration for the firm's burgee. This burgee was later adopted by the Oceanic Steam Navigation Company under the ownership of Thomas Ismay in 1867, who bought the burgee and the goodwill from Wilson after the latter's firm went into liquidation.

== History ==
Red Jacket left Rockland under tow, and was rigged in New York. Her captain was a veteran packet ship commander, Asa Eldridge of Yarmouth, Massachusetts, and she had a crew of 65. On the passage to Liverpool, she averaged 14.5 knots (26.9 km/h) for the latter part of the voyage, with sustained bursts of 17 knots (31.5 km/h).

A Collins Line steamer arriving in Liverpool (which had left New York two days before Red Jacket) reported that Red Jacket was just astern. As she entered the harbor, tugs tried to get lines aboard the clipper but she was traveling too fast. Thousands, alerted by the Collins Liner, watched as Eldridge shortened sail and backed the vessel into its berth.

On this voyage, Red Jacket set the speed record for sailing ships making the Transatlantic crossing from New York to Liverpool in 13 days, 1 hour, 25 minutes, dock to dock. The time between Sandy Hook and the Bell Buoy (at the entrance to the Mersey) was 11 days, but the harbour pilot refused to take her on into the port of Liverpool until the next day due to adverse weather conditions, so extending the passage time dock-to-dock.

A few days after the Red Jacket's arrival in Liverpool, the accuracy of the ship's log—and thus the integrity of her captain—was questioned in a letter to The Times of London. The letter came from a highly authoritative source, Lloyd's of London, but was signed only with the author's initials "A.W.J." It prompted a fierce rebuttal the following day from a second correspondent who also did not disclose his name, but was clearly American. Three days later, the final word in this correspondence went to Asa Eldridge himself; The Times printed a letter from him (sent in his own name) in which he patiently explained why the original correspondent was wrong in his interpretation of the ship's log.

At Liverpool, the Red Jacket had her bottom coppered and cabins fitted out for the Australian immigrant trade. She was purchased by Pilkington & Wilcox and other Liverpool investors with registry changing on April 24, 1854. (Most secondary sources say that the vessel was bought by the British a year later, copying a mistake made by earlier historians.) She was then chartered by the White Star Line for a run to Melbourne, Victoria. Under Captain Samuel Reid (who owned 1/16 of her), she reached in Melbourne in 69 days. Only one clipper, James Baines, ever made the run faster. On 13 June 1859, whilst on a voyage from Liverpool to Melbourne, she collided with the British merchant ship Elizabeth Walker, which sank. Red Jacket rescued the crew of Elizabeth Walker, which was on a voyage from Buenos Aires, Argentina to London.

Red Jacket served in the immigrant trade until 1866, when she was sold to Portugal. In May 1871, she ran aground at Ponta Delgada whilst on a voyage from Lisbon to Boston. She was refloated and completed her voyage.

=== Fate ===
In 1872 Red Jacket became a lumber carrier from Quebec to London, joining the clippers Marco Polo and Donald McKay, which "ended their days" in the transatlantic Quebec timber trade. On 29 January 1878, she put in to Boston in a leaky condition, her crew refusing to proceed. She was recorded as a collier on a voyage from New York to Lisbon. In 1882, she dragged her anchors in a heavy gale whilst on a voyage from Lisbon to Casablanca and ran aground near Soria Kedima and was driven ashore on 16 December 1882; the sale of her wreckage fetched just £113. It completely disappeared in 1907.
