= Asa Eldridge =

American sea captain (1809–1856)

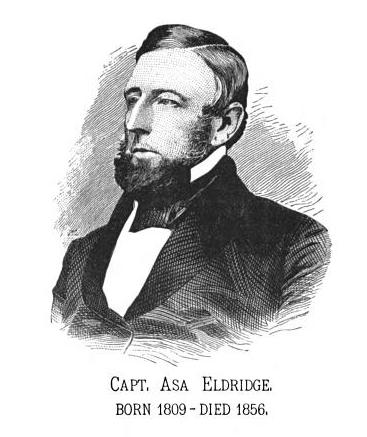
- Born: July 25, 1809; Yarmouth, Massachusetts
- Died: 1856 (aged 46–47) died at sea
- Occupation: sea captain
- Known for: skippered the Red Jacket on a record-setting Atlantic crossing

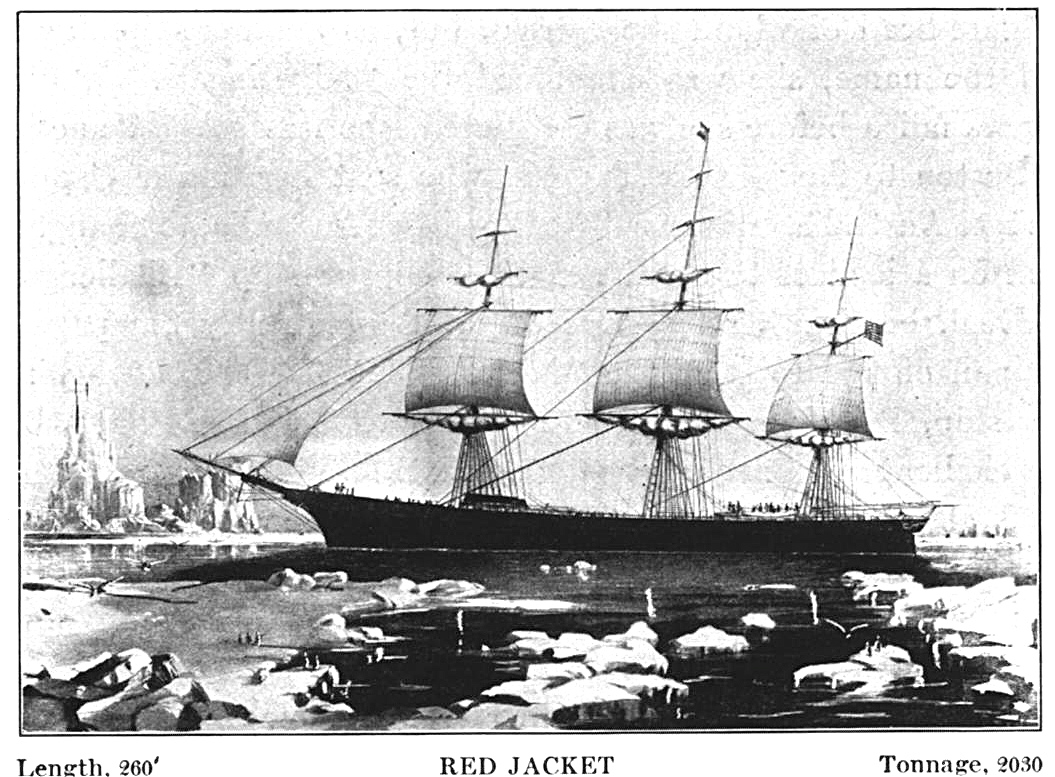
The clipper Red Jacket

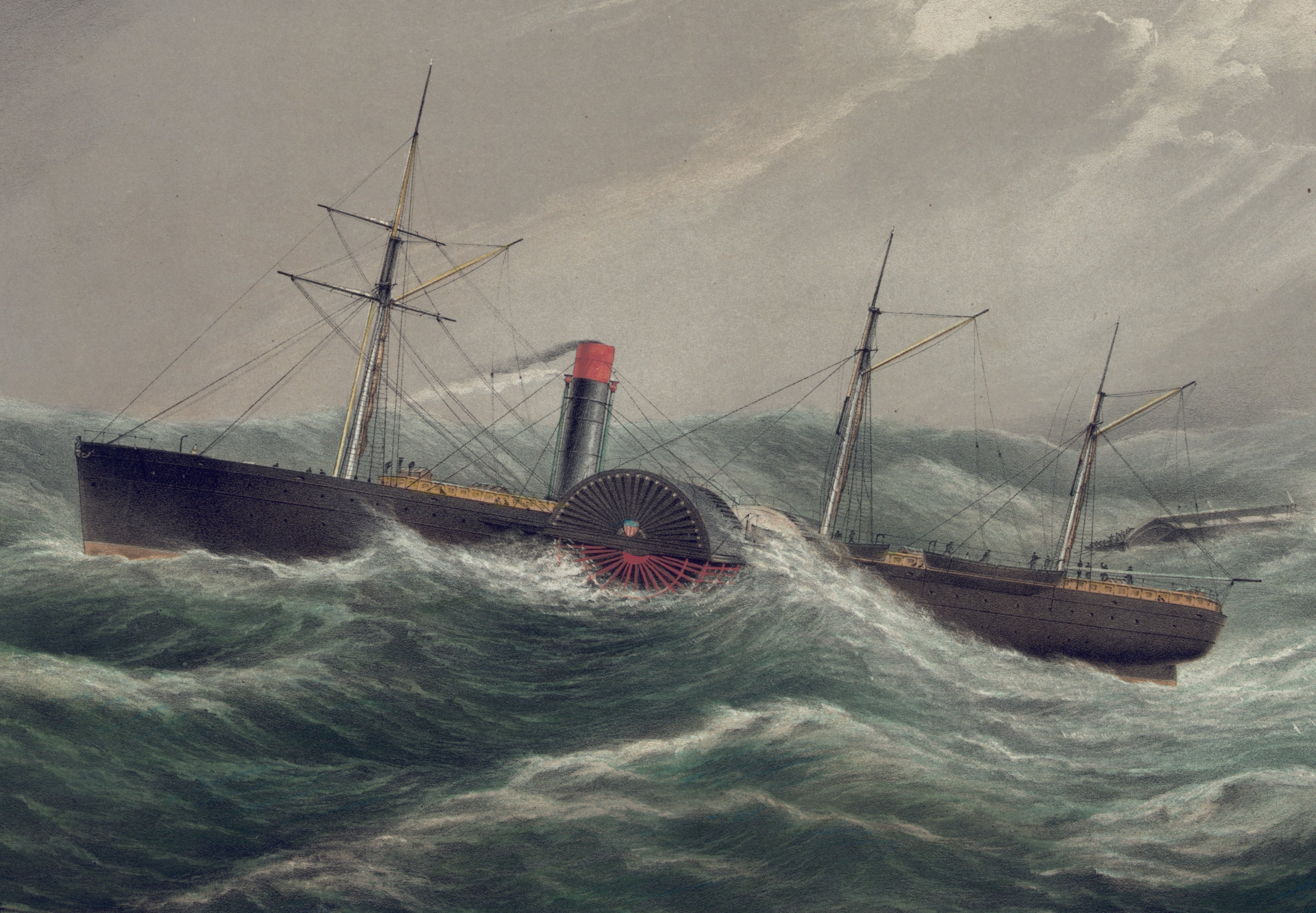
Steamship Pacific

Asa Eldridge (1809–1856) was a sea captain from Yarmouth, Massachusetts. In 1854, Captain Eldridge guided the clipper ship Red Jacket from New York and to Liverpool in only in 13 days, 1 hour, and 25 minutes, dock to dock, setting a speed record for the fastest trans-Atlantic crossing by a commercial sailing vessel that has remained unbroken ever since. In 1856, Captain Eldridge skippered the ill-fated steamship SS Pacific, which disappeared at sea on a voyage from Liverpool to New York.

Eldridge is also known for having captained Cornelius Vanderbilt's private steam-powered yacht, the North Star, when the tycoon took a small group of family and friends on a summer-long cruise around Europe in 1853, and for his prior command of the packet ship Roscius in E.K. Collins' Dramatic Line.

== Contemporary account ==
Charles Francis Swift says of Eldridge:

In one sense out of the usual order of events,—because the date and time of his departure is hidden from those on earth,—we record here the departure of Capt. Asa Eldridge, one of the most gallant sailors Cape Cod has contributed to that noble fraternity. He was born in this town, July 25, 1809, the son of Capt. John, a citizen of repute and renown. He took early to the sea, like all Cape Cod boys, commanded some fine ships, sailing for years in the 'Dramatic line' controlled by E.K. Collins, a Truro man of pluck and vigor. Cornelius Vanderbilt, discovering his ability, induced him to enter his service. He commanded the North Star on the famous excursion to Europe, with Mr. Vanderbilt and family, which voyage was commemorated by Rev. Dr. Chowles, in a volume of great interest, in which he paid appropriate tribute to the gallantry and skill of Capt. Eldridge. Capt. Eldridge possessed not only self-confidence and daring, but skill and endurance, and the generous traits which are in imagination connected with the true-born, American sailor. Jan. 25, 1856, after a voyage across the Atlantic, in which he successfully competed with a Cunard line steamer, sailed in the steamer Pacific, from Liverpool, England, on a return trip to New York. He was never heard from more. It was a year of unprecedented disaster to vessels; many were foundered, or went down in the gales; the best nautical opinion is to the effect that the Pacific struck an iceberg, and that all on board met an instant death.

== More recent and extensive account ==
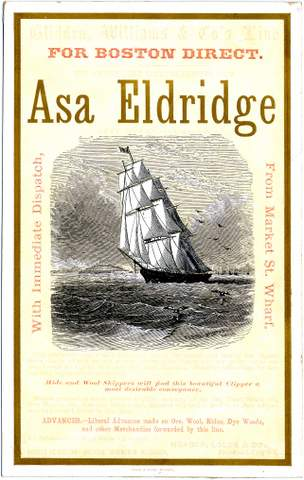
A sailing card for the Asa Eldridge an A1 Extreme Clipper named after him

Recent research has revealed many additional details about Asa Eldridge's career, including an earlier record-setting voyage two decades before his more famous feat on the Red Jacket. That earlier record came in 1833 on the ship America, which Eldridge took from Boston to Calcutta in 89 days – a time that remained unbeaten for the next two decades, and was then only bettered by one of the new generation of clipper ships. The new research also identified a number of other vessels that Eldridge commanded during his career that had not previously been linked with him. These include three sailing ships that he took to the Far East in the 1830s; another that he sailed around the "cotton triangle" in the early 1840s; a second Dramatic Liner, in addition to the Roscius long associated with him; and two early transatlantic steamships. Eldridge's close connection to the first of those steamships appears to have been the circumstance that introduced him to Cornelius Vanderbilt, and in turn to his appointment as commander of the North Star.
