= Edward Knight Collins =

Early American shipbuilder

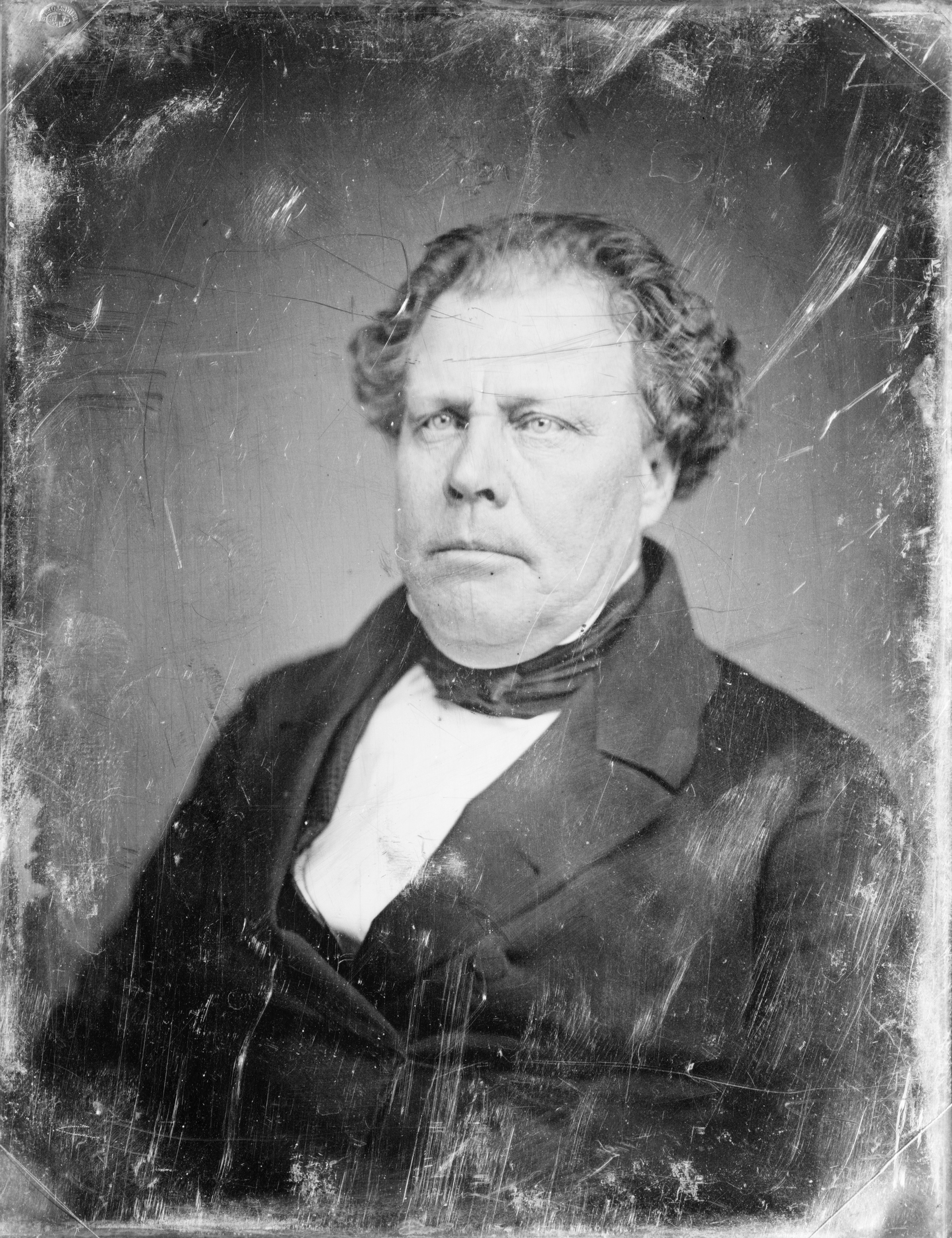
- Edward K. Collins, American shipping magnate
- Born: August 5, 1802; Truro, Massachusetts, US
- Died: January 22, 1878 (aged 75); New York City, US
- Occupation: Shipbuilder
- Spouse(s): Mary Ann Woodruff (1826), Sarah Browne (1862)
- Children: 3

Edward Knight Collins I (5 August 1802 – 22 January 1878) was an American shipping magnate.

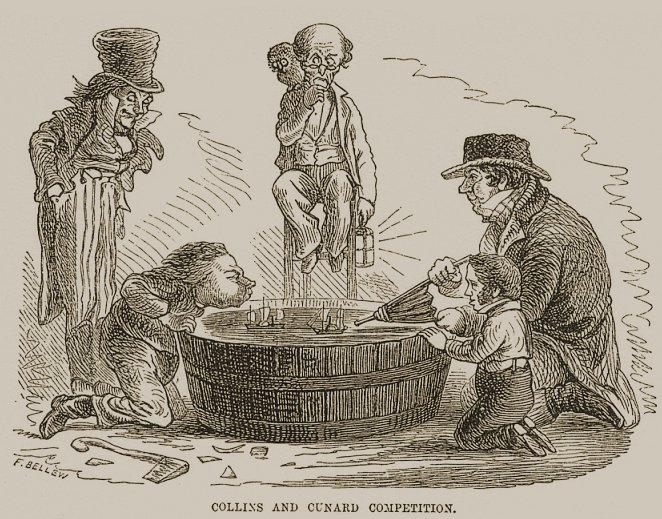
The trans-Atlantic shipping competition between Collins and UK shipping magnate Samuel Cunard as caricatured by Frank Bellew in 1852

== Early life ==
He was born on August 5, 1802, in Truro, Massachusetts, to Israel Gross Collins (1776–1831) and Mary Ann Knight (c. 1780 – Jan 3, 1803). His mother was a niece of Sir Edward Knight and she died shortly after Edward was born. His aunts then raised him. His father moved to New York City. At age thirteen in 1815, Collins left Truro for New Jersey to attend school. He then went to New York City as an apprentice clerk in the counting house of McCrea and Slidell. Within a few years, Edward moved to Delaplaine and Company.

== Shipping career ==
In 1821 he joined his father's company and in January 1824 he became a partner in I. G. Collins & Son. In 1827 they started the first regularly scheduled packet service between New York City and Veracruz, Mexico. In 1826, Collins married Mary Ann Woodruff, the daughter of Thomas T. Woodruff. They had a son, Edward K. Collins II, as well as a daughter and at least one other child.

After his father's death in 1831 he became involved with the cotton trade between New Orleans and New York. He bought his first shipping line in 1831. In 1836, he launched the Dramatic Line of sailing packets, which quickly became a major presence on what was then the world's most important shipping route, between New York and Liverpool. He received a government subsidy in 1847 to carry mail on that same route, for which purpose he formed the New York and Liverpool United States Mail Steamship Company (the "Collins Line") to compete with Britain's Cunard Line. The new Line's inaugural voyage took place in April 1850, and for the next six years its steamships were the biggest, fastest and most luxurious on the Atlantic. They were hugely expensive to operate, however, and in 1852 Collins was forced to go back to Congress to secure a major increase in his subsidy for carrying mail. This left him in a very vulnerable position when the increase was canceled in 1856 after two of the Line's four steamships sank: the Arctic had sunk in 1854 while carrying his wife and two of his children., and less than two years later the Pacific disappeared without a trace on her way back from Liverpool to New York. The Collins Line struggled on for another couple of years, using the insurance payouts for its two lost ships to build an even bigger steamer called the Adriatic. But after its subsidy was reduced it simply could not make ends meet, and in February 1858 the Line finally folded.

== Later life ==
Collins moved to his summer home, "Collinwood" in Wellsville, Ohio, where he engaged in coal mining and oil drilling. He remarried, to Sarah Browne, and by 1862 he had moved back to New York City, where he died on January 22, 1878. The will of "Commodore" Collins left his widow household furniture; horses carriages and harness. The balance of his property was to be divided into six parts: 2 parts to his wife; 1 part to be divided among his three sisters (Oliva Collins; Ann Collins; Sexta Coffin} 1 part apiece to each of his three sons {John; Thomas W; E.K) He was buried in an unmarked grave in Woodlawn Cemetery, Bronx.
