= Collins Line =

Defunct American shipping company (1818-58)

- Trade name: New York and Liverpool United States Mail Steamship Company
- Type: Ocean-going transport
- Founded: 1818; 208 years ago
- Founder: Israel Collins, Edward Knight Collins
- Defunct: 1858; 168 years ago
- Fate: Bankrupt following recession and termination of government subsidy
- Headquarters: New York
- Area served: Routes: Transatlantic, Gulf of Mexico; Ports of call: Liverpool, New Orleans, Veracruz
- Key people: Bankers: Brown Bros. & Co.
- Services: Shipping company
- Ships owned: Arctic, Baltic, Pacific, Atlantic, and Adriatic
- Competitors: Cunard Line
- Govt contracts: Mail contract
- Govt subsidies: $385,000 annually (occasionally more)

The Collins Line, formally the New York and Liverpool United States Mail Steamship Company, was an American maritime transport company started by Israel Collins and then built up by his son Edward Knight Collins. Under Edward Collins' guidance, the company grew to be a serious competitor to the British Cunard Line.

== Early days ==
The Collins Line, as it was commonly known at the time, were the ships and lines run by the shipping company, I. G. Collins (later I. G. Collins and Son). Israel Collins had left the sea in 1818 to establish the shipping company in New York City. The firm traded in a fairly small way. In 1824, Israel was joined by his son Edward. In January 1825, Edward took advantage of a cotton shortage in England to charter a schooner in order to get to Charleston, South Carolina, ahead of his competitors and corner the market in cotton. This was the turning point in the company. In 1827, the company started a line of packets sailing between New York and Veracruz on the Mexican coast. The line prospered. Israel Collins died in 1831, and Edward took over management of a New York-New Orleans packet line. He made a great success of this venture as well.

== Transatlantic freight trade ==
Up until 1835 the company had not seriously competed in the transatlantic trade, but in that year it received a new ship, the Shakspeare. The ship was dispatched to Liverpool and returned with the largest cargo yet brought to New York. From then on, the company was a serious competitor for the transatlantic trade. At that time, all of the competing shipping firms were American. Collins' ships predominantly carried cotton for the English cotton industry. The firm continued to commission the largest ships that it could, and three vessels, Garrick, Sheridan, and Siddons, were added to the fleet. In 1838 the 1,030-ton Roscius was added, larger than any competitor. At that time, Collins' main rival was the Black Ball Line, also of New York.

== Transatlantic mail and passenger service ==
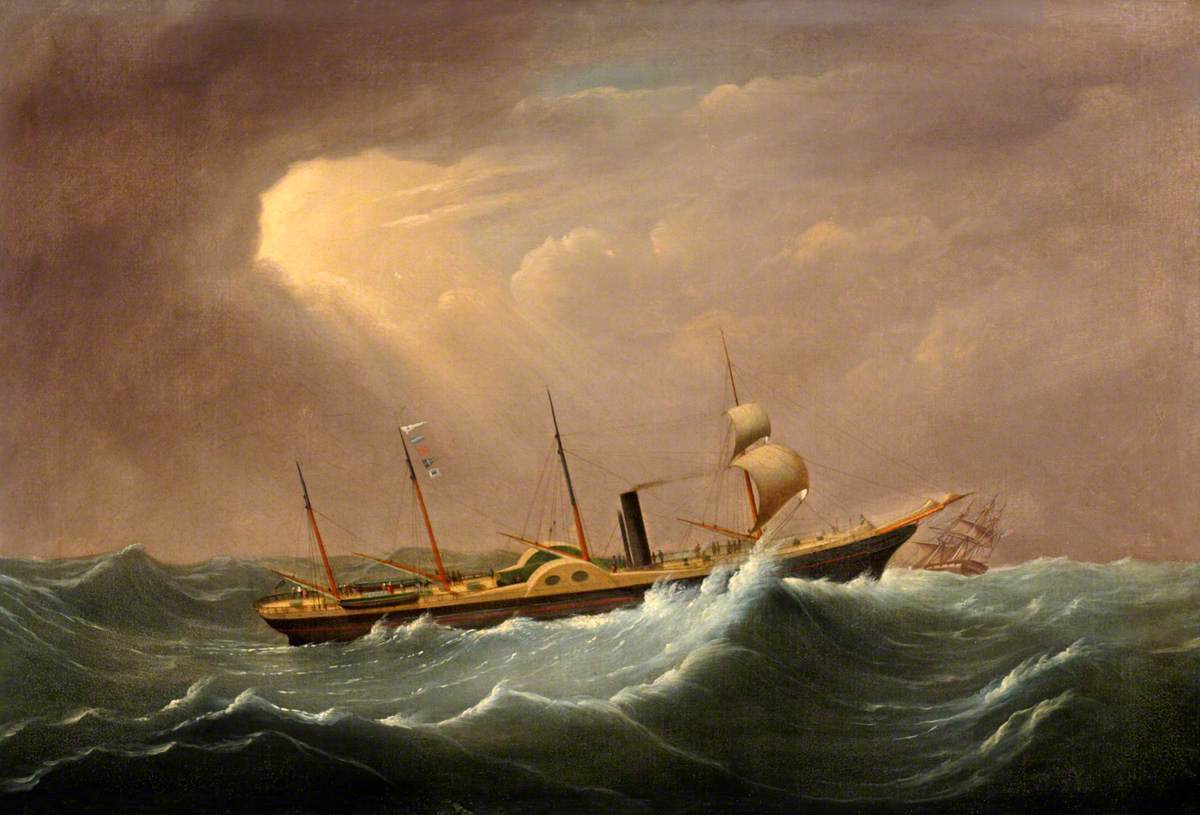
The "Great Western".

House flags

First

Second

First house flag of the Collins Line began to be used even before passenger service began. This was listed in the early 1850s, possibly because the Jack of the United States was becoming more and more similar.

In 1838, the SS Great Western, owned by the British Great Western Steamship Company, crossed the Atlantic in 15 days and heralded a new age in the transatlantic trade. Two years later, the British & North American Royal Mail Steam Packet Company, commonly known as Cunard Line, began transatlantic steam packet service between Liverpool and Halifax, after winning the tender for subsidies from the British admiralty. In 1840–41, four ships were delivered to Cunard for this service, with two additional ships following in 1844.

Dissatisfied with the dominance of British companies in the transatlantic mail packet trade, the US Congress decided to begin a state-subsidized service of their own in 1845. The United States Postmaster General Office invited tenders from US-based shipping companies for a service from New York City to ports in Northern Europe. Four companies, including a group led by Collins, submitted their proposals. A five-year tender of carrying mail from New York to Bremen was eventually awarded to the Ocean Steam Navigation Company, led by Edward Mills, which began service in 1846.

In 1849, the US Postmaster General Office invited companies to submit bids for a ten-year federal government-subsidized mail service contract between New York and Liverpool, in direct competition with Cunard, which had opened a similar service in 1848. Collins submitted his ambitious plan to operate a weekly service on the route with five ships superior to those of Cunard in every way. Collins' proposal convinced the authorities and the tender was awarded to his New York and Liverpool United States Steamship Company, commonly known as the Collins Line. Due to the financial constraints of building five ships, the service was eventually scaled down to a bi-weekly operation using four ships. Collins hired the young George Steers, who later designed the famous yacht America, to design his new ships. Named Atlantic, Arctic, Baltic and Pacific, the new ships were superior to those of Cunard Line in many ways: at nearly 3,000 tons, they were twice as large as Cunard's largest ships; at their maximum speed of 12 knots, faster; and they included many new innovations such as steam-heating, running water and a ventilation system in all accommodations. Other features included bathing cabins, a hairdressing salon and separate lounges for men and women.

The Atlantic was the first ship in service, beginning her maiden voyage on 27 April 1850. With the crossing from New York to Liverpool taking 10 days and 16 hours, the ship clipped 12 hours off the existing Cunard record. Atlantic and her sister ships consistently bettered the crossing times of the Cunard ships, and the Baltic became the first mail ship to cross in less than ten days. However, due to their high speeds, the Collins steamers were also extremely uneconomic, with fuel consumption at 87 tons of coal per day (compared to 37 tons for Cunard ships). Additionally, the ships required constant expensive repairs due to structural damage to their wooden hulls caused by their excessively powerful engines.

Within two years of its initial oceanic voyage, the Collins Line was in financial trouble. The annual federal subsidy of $385,000, which its organizers and major investors first believed was sufficient to assure profitability, appeared seriously inadequate. Collins and his backers, in viewing the profitable and expanding operations of their transatlantic competitor, Cunard Lines, believed there was both need and justification for a substantial increase in the subsidy, especially in light of additional support Cunard was receiving. Cunard's annual subsidy had been considerably more than doubled—from £55,000 ($275,000) to £145,000 ($725,000) between 1839 and 1846—and by 1852 it had been increased to £173,340 ($866,700). To make matters worse, by 1852 Cunard was offering at least twice as many sailings to North America as Collins. This was especially the case during the unprofitable winter season when the Collins Line ran only one steamer per month across the Atlantic, while Cunard—now operating from New York as well as Boston—maintained a weekly schedule by providing alternate bi-weekly services between both New York and Boston and its British terminus at Liverpool.

As a consequence, in early January 1852, the Collins Line, with the support of both the Postmaster-General Nathan K. Hall and the Secretary of the Navy William Alexander Graham, petitioned Congress for a major increase in subsidy. Notwithstanding the popularity of its huge, fast and luxurious vessels, Collins had been losing money steadily. Shareholders had not received a cent in dividends and the stock was selling far below its initial offering price. And now the US government was asking the line to increase the frequency of its winter sailings simply to match the current Cunard schedule between New York and Liverpool. In those circumstances, Edward Collins maintained, the subsidy would have to be more than doubled just to break even. He therefore sought an increase to $858,000 per year.

Discussion of the subsidy persisted until a compromise was hammered out, under which Congress after December 1854 would be free to terminate the increase upon giving Collins six months' notice.

== Disasters ==
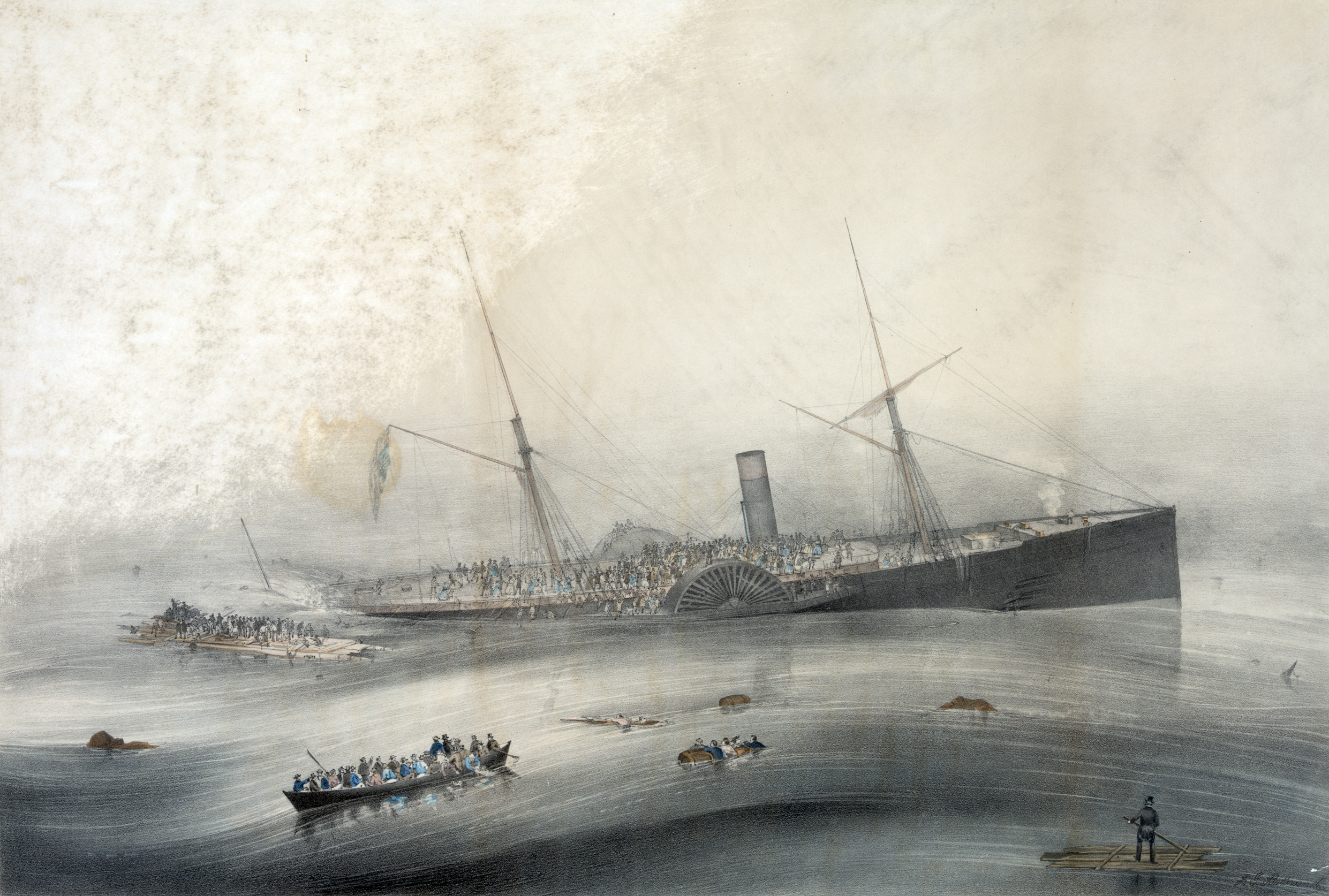
Arctic sinking by the stern after colliding with Vesta.

On 20 September 1854, the Arctic left Liverpool with 233 passengers, including Collins' wife, their only daughter 19-year-old Mary Ann and youngest son 15-year-old Henry Coit. The ship had a good crossing until she encountered thick fog less than sixty miles from the North American coast. In the fog off Cape Race, Newfoundland, she collided with the 250-ton French iron propeller ship SS Vesta, and was holed in three places. The Arctic had no watertight compartments and began to fill with water. The captain tried to reach land before the ship sank, but only fifteen miles from shore, the ship rolled over and sank. 322 passengers are said to have perished. The next day Collins went to meet his family, but received a letter from the captain telling him that his wife and two children were dead.

Grief-stricken though Collins was, he did not give up his determination to dominate the transatlantic trade. He began to plan a new ship that would be bigger, faster and more luxurious than the rest, the Adriatic.

In 1856, before the new ship had been completed, the Pacific disappeared without trace while on a voyage from Liverpool. Forty-five passengers and 141 crew members were lost, including her captain, Asa Eldridge, who had previously worked for Collins as commander of the packet ship Roscius of the Dramatic Line. The consensus at the time was that the missing steamer had probably collided with an iceberg and sunk: Eldridge would have been desperate to stay ahead of the Persia, the Cunard Line’s first iron-hulled steamer, which was due to leave Liverpool a few days after the Pacific on her maiden voyage, and was herself damaged by ice floes on that voyage. This explanation of the Pacific’s disappearance was challenged in 1993 when a wreck found off the coast of Wales was identified as the ship's remains. The accuracy of that conclusion has been questioned, however, and alternative evidence presented in support of the contemporary verdict about her loss.

== End of the company ==
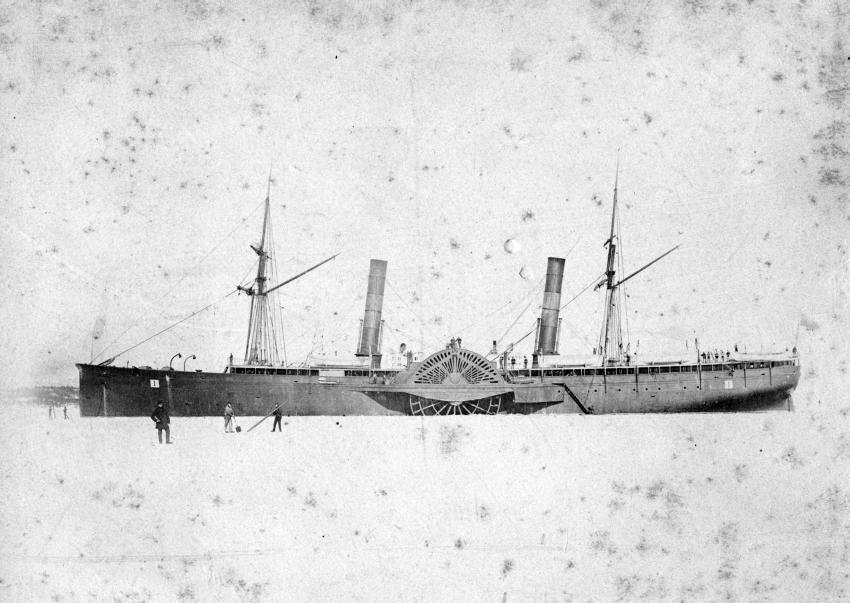
SS Adriatic stuck in the ice in North Sydney harbor in March 1862. This is one of the only existing photographs of any Collins liner.

The Collins Line – Yet unconquered, it has only itself to beat.

— A toast on April 17, 1856 from Mayor Fernando Wood,
at a New York City banquet honoring the
shipwrights of the SS Adriatic.

The Adriatic was launched on April 7, 1856. She was 355 feet (108 m) long and was 3,670 tons, with a maximum speed of 13 knots (24 km/h; 15 mph). She was intended to begin service in November, but due to technical problems, she did not run her sea trials until 1857. In August 1857, shortly before the onset of a brief but severe depression, Congress finally gave the required six-month notice of a subsidy reduction to the pre-1852 amount of $385,000 yearly and for only twenty trips. By the next February, the Collins Line had suspended operations, and on 1 April 1858, in the midst of bankruptcy proceedings, its remaining vessels were sold at auction. The Adriatic only made one voyage for Collins' company under these circumstances. The Atlantic made a sailing in December 1857 and Baltic made one in January 1858, but in February the planned sailing of the Atlantic was cancelled and the company was wound up. The Adriatic, in the service of her new owners, made a crossing from Galway to Newfoundland in only 5 days 19¾ hours.

The Collins Line's remaining ships were auctioned off to pay creditors:

- The Adriatic was sold for British mail service. The S. S. Adriatic featured on the 12 cent postage stamp in the US Postal Service's 1869 Pictorial Issue. After conversion to a sailing ship in 1871, it became a coal hulk for the African Steamship line and was beached in August 1885 in Bonny, Rivers State, Africa, after it was leaking so badly it could no longer be used as a storeship.
- The Atlantic was sold; it was broken up for scrap in September 1871.
- The Baltic was sold and later converted to a sailing ship; it was broken up in 1880.

The collapse of the Collins line left Cunard with very little opposition in the Atlantic, as the Great Western Steamship Company had already ceased trading.

== Collins Line fleet ==
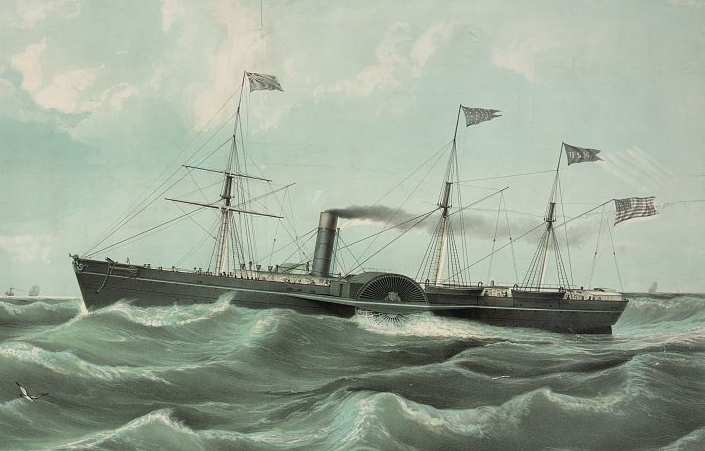
Steamship Atlantic

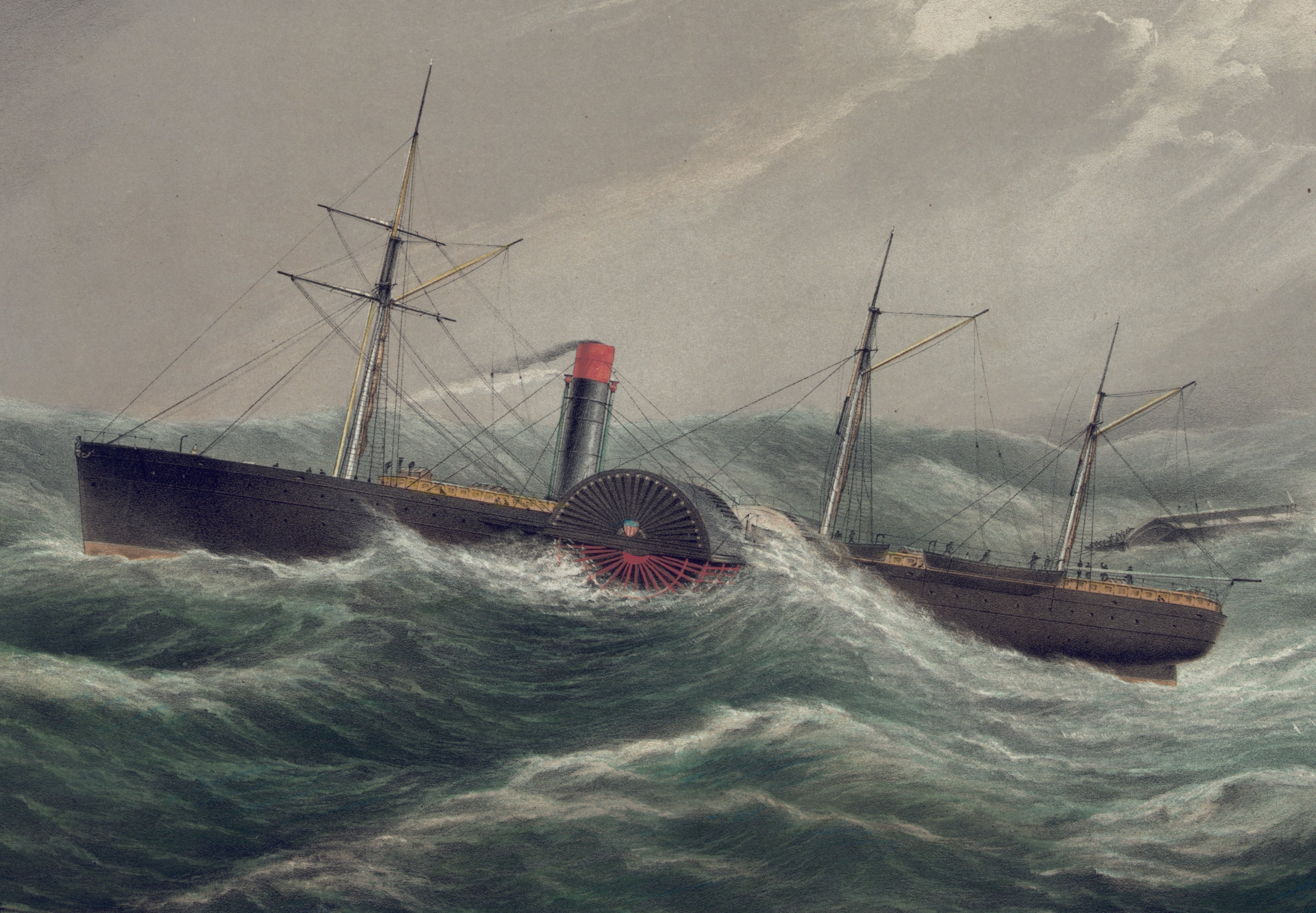
Steamship Pacific

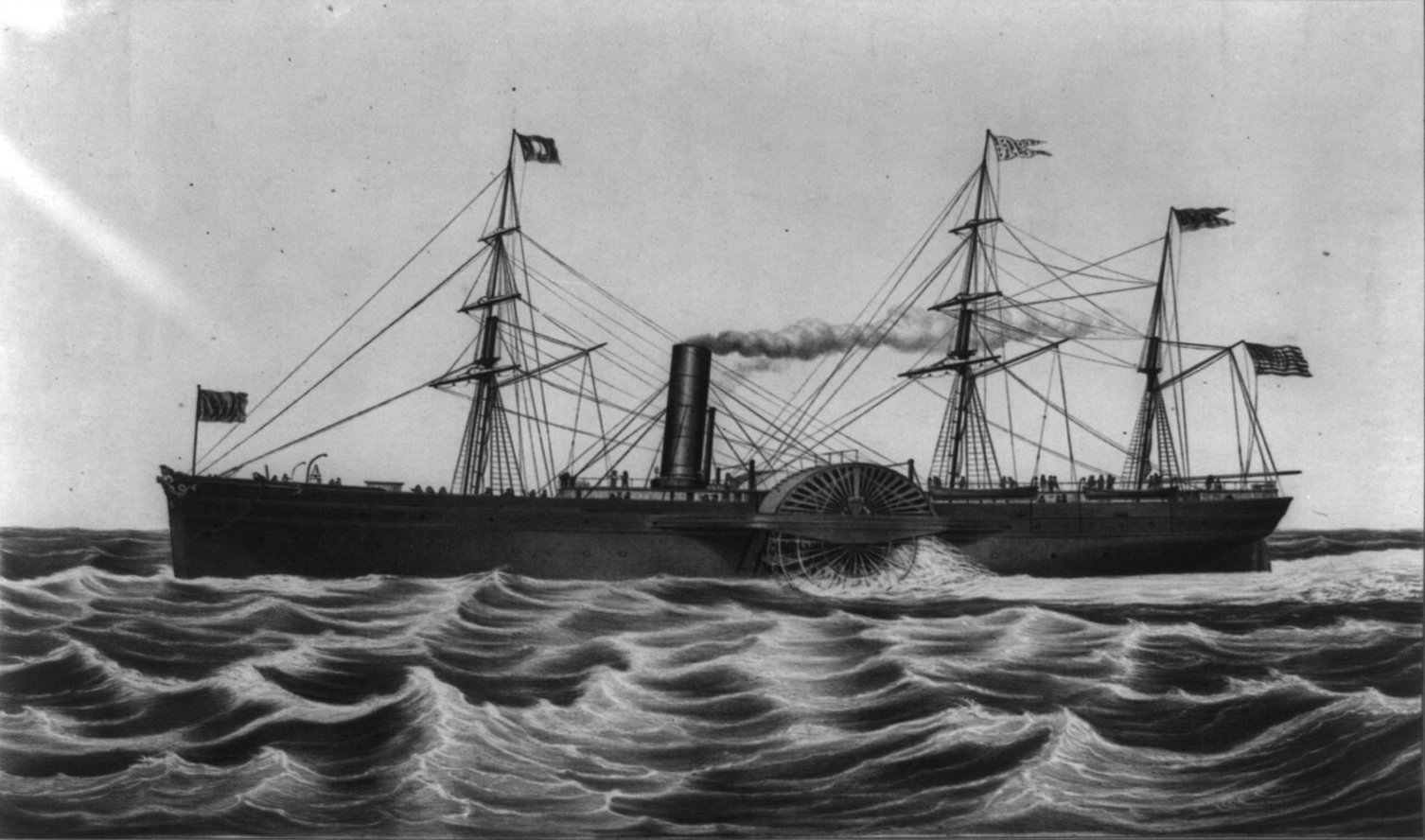
Steamship Arctic

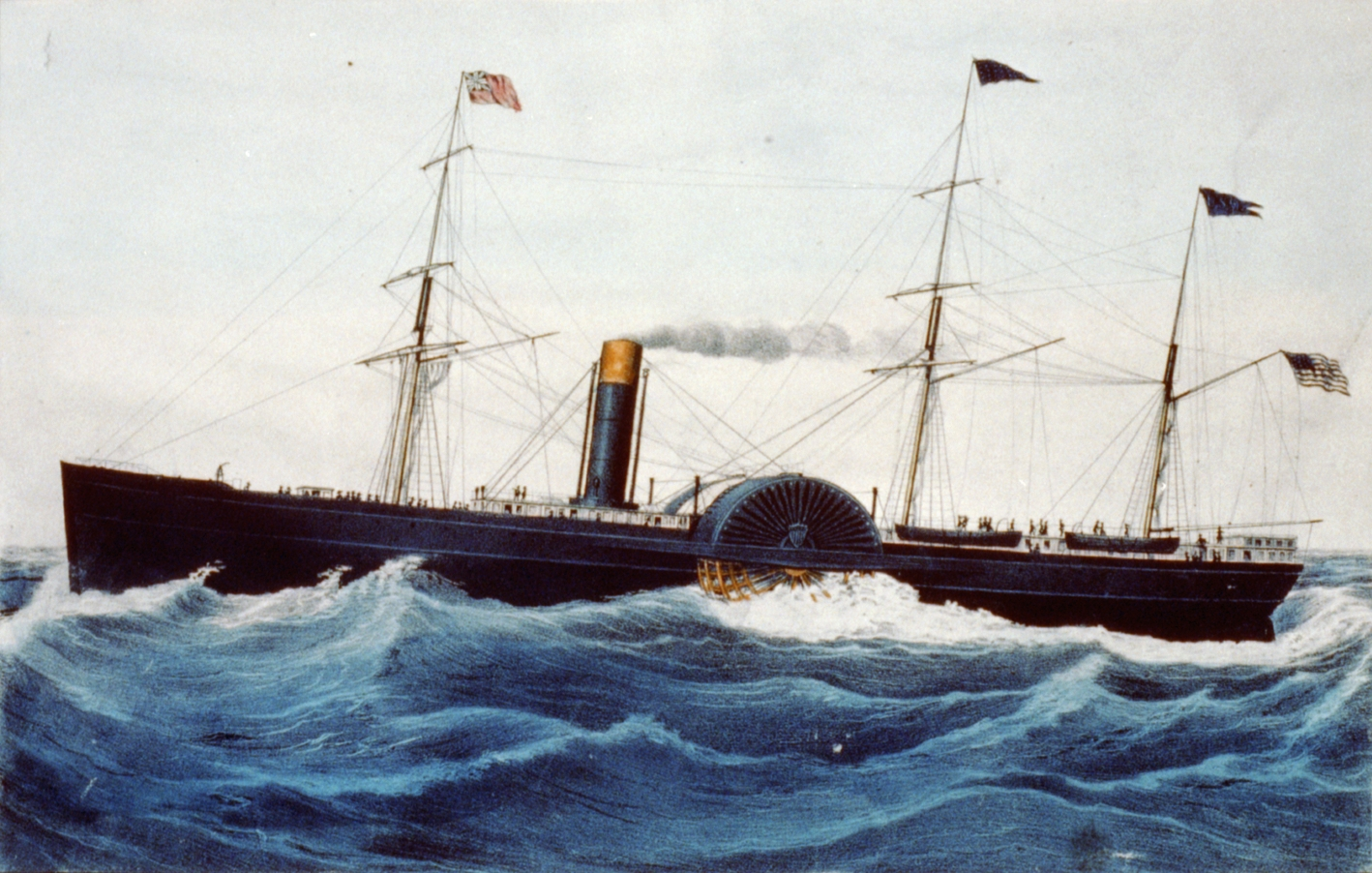
Steamship Baltic

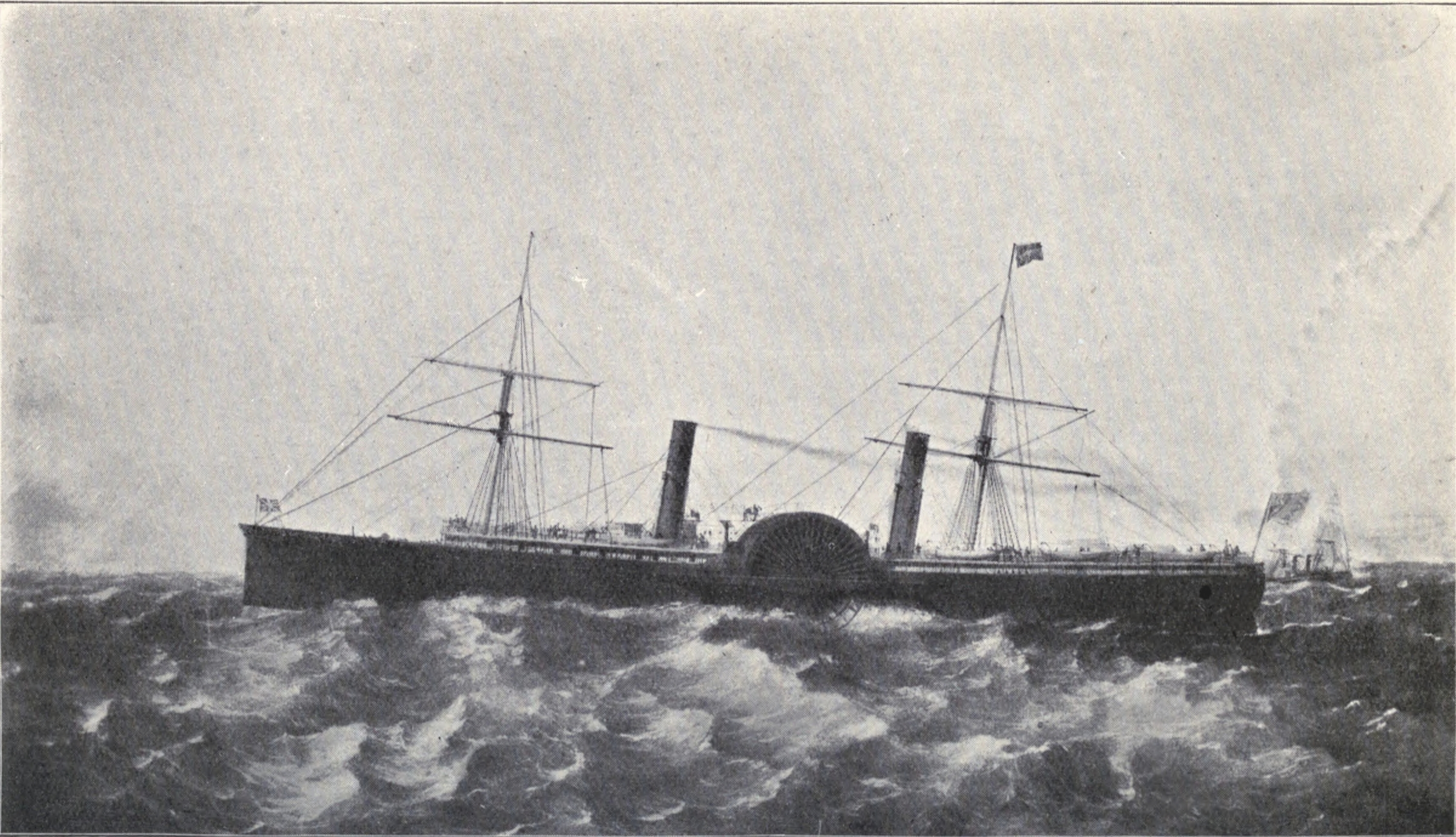
Steamship Adriatic
