= SS Baltic (1850) =

American Sidewheel steamer

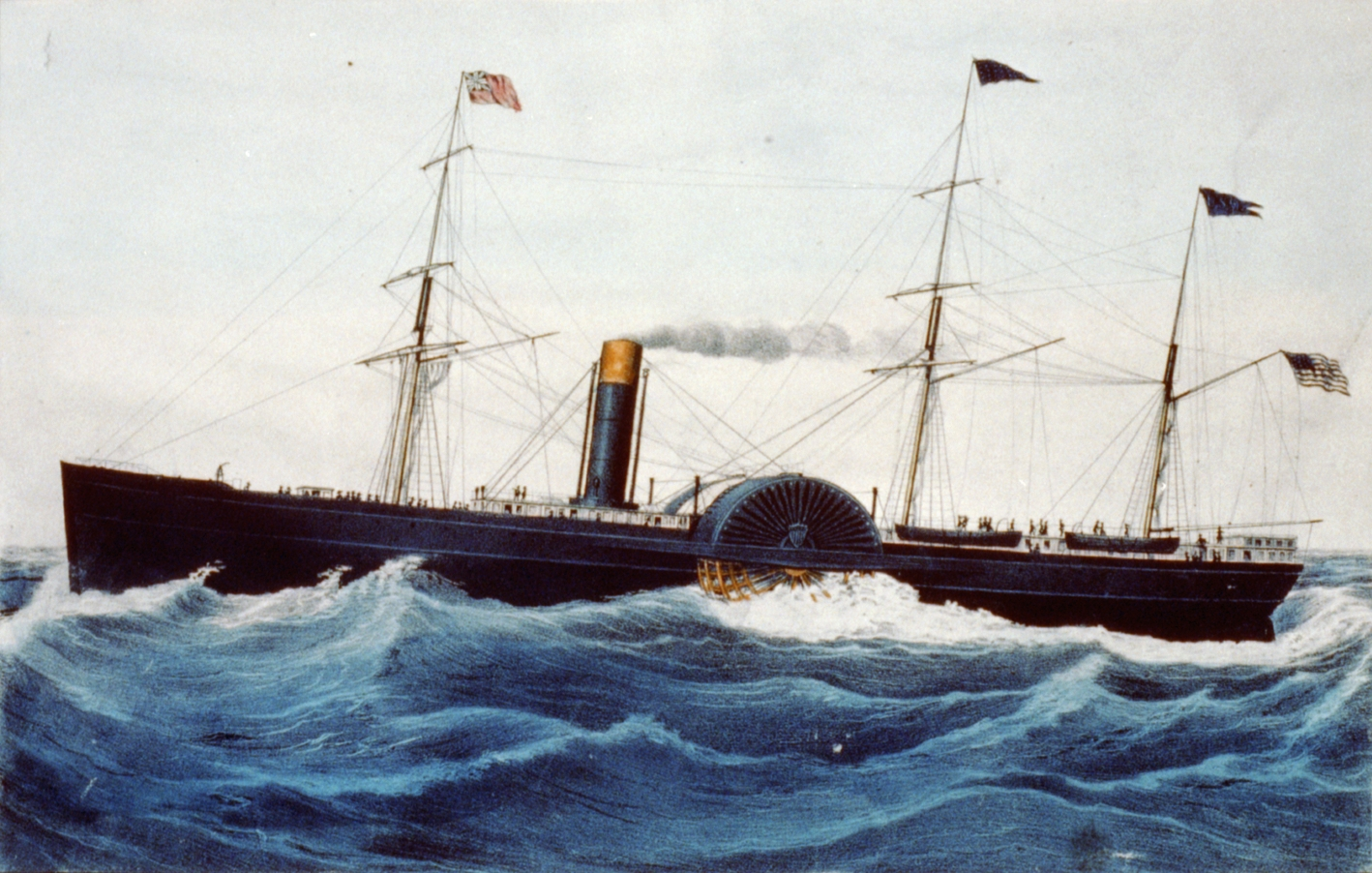
- Baltic

History

United States
- Name: Baltic
- Namesake: Baltic Sea
- Operator: Collins Line
- Route: New York–Liverpool
- Builder: Brown & Bell, New York
- Cost: ~$750,000
- Launched: 5 Feb 1850
- Maiden voyage: 16 Nov 1850
- In service: 16 Nov 1850
- Out of service: 1880
- Refit: As a sailing ship, 1870
- Honors and awards: Blue Riband holder, 16 Aug 1851–29 Apr 1856
- Fate: Scrapped, 1880

General characteristics
- Type: Passenger
- Tonnage: 2,723 gross tons
- Length: 282 ft (86 m)
- Beam: 45 ft (14 m)
- Depth of hold: 24 ft
- Propulsion: 2 × 500 hp, 96-inch bore, 10-foot stroke single-cylinder side-lever steam engines
- Speed: 13 knots
- Capacity: Passengers: 200 1st class, 80 2nd class

SS Baltic was a wooden-hulled sidewheel steamer built in 1850 for transatlantic service with the American Collins Line. Designed to outclass their chief rivals from the British-owned Cunard Line, Baltic and her three sister ships—Atlantic, Pacific and Arctic—were the largest, fastest and most luxurious transatlantic steamships of their day.

Less than a year after entering service, Baltic captured the coveted Blue Riband in 1851 for fastest transatlantic crossing by a steamship. She set a new record again in 1854, and was to remain the fastest steamship on the Atlantic for almost five years. In spite of these record-breaking achievements however, her Collins Line owners continued to lose money, and were eventually bankrupted in 1858.

Baltic subsequently operated as a coastal steamer along the East Coast of the United States, and later served as a transport for the Union cause during the American Civil War before briefly returning to transatlantic service. In her final years she was converted into a sailing ship. Baltic was scrapped in 1880.

== Development ==
For several decades prior to the 1840s, American sailing ships had dominated the transatlantic routes between Europe and the United States. With the coming of oceangoing steamships however, the U.S. lost its dominance as British steamship companies, particularly the government-subsidized Cunard Line, established regular and reliable steam packet services between the U.S. and Britain.

In 1847, the U.S. Congress granted a large subsidy to the New York and Liverpool United States Mail Steamship Company for the establishment of an American steam packet service to compete with Britain's Cunard Line. With this generous subsidy in hand, the New York and Liverpool S.S.C ordered four new ships from New York shipyards and established a new shipping line, the Collins Line, to manage them. The Collins Line ships were specifically designed to be larger and faster, and to offer a greater degree of passenger comfort, than their Cunard Line counterparts. Design of the ships was entrusted to a noted New York naval architect, George Steers.

== Description ==
Baltic's 282-foot wooden hull was built from yellow pine, with keel and frames of white oak and chestnut. Like her three sister ships, Baltic had straight stems, a single smokestack, three square-rigged masts for auxiliary power, and a flat main deck with two single-story cabins, one fore and one aft. The ships were painted in Collins Line colors—black hull with a dark red stripe running the length of the ship, and a black stack with a dark red top.

=== Passenger accommodations ===
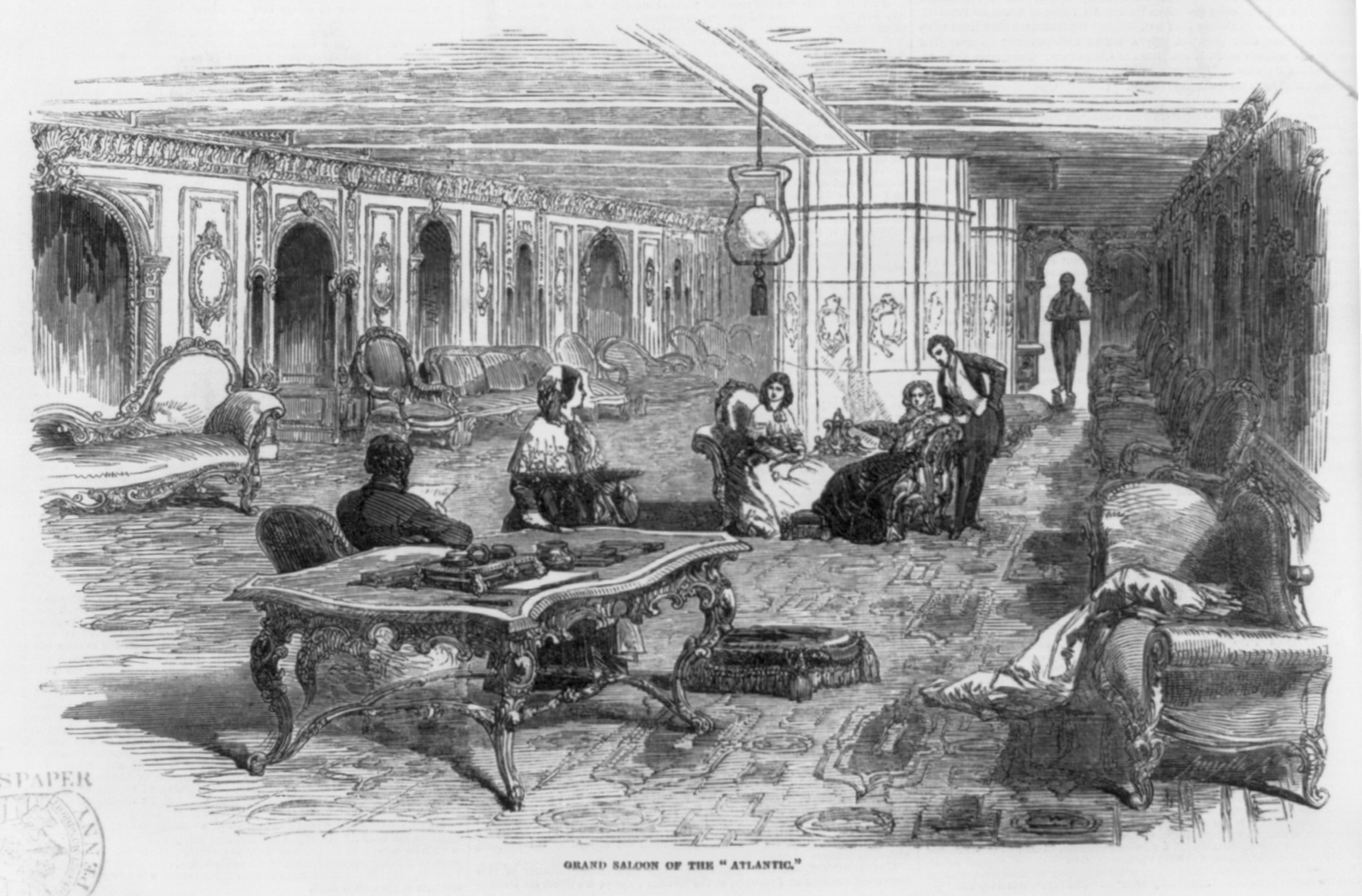
The Grand Saloon of Baltic's sister ship Atlantic, showing the glass columns used to transmit sunlight

While the outward appearance of the Collins Line ships has been described as imposing rather than elegant, the passenger accommodations provided a marked contrast. Here the managers of the Line broke with the generally austere tradition of oceangoing steamships of the era to spend extravagant sums on fittings and passenger comforts.

Like her sister ships, Baltic was initially designed to accommodate 200 first-class passengers in about 150 separate berths, including several large "honeymoon" berths. All the berths were spacious and included two washbasins and a sofa in addition to the beds, which were finished in satinwood and draped with damask curtains. Two innovations were also introduced—a bell-rope system for summoning the steward, and steam heating.

The passenger berths were arranged around two large central saloons—a dining saloon and a grand saloon—into which they opened. Each saloon was illuminated by several large-diameter ventilated columns of patterned glass which stretched from the floor to a skylight in the spar deck above, while stained glass windows in the stern provided additional light. The saloons were richly carpeted, furnished with variegated Italian marble tables and superior quality furniture, and finished in a combination of woods, including rose, satin and olive. Mirrors around the walls enhanced the effect of spaciousness. A ladies' drawing-room was also provided.

On the main deck above, the foredeck cabin included the officers' quarters, a first-class kitchen complete with French maitré de cuisine, and, in another innovation, a barber's shop, with patented adjustable chair. The aft cabin, which connected to the saloon below, contained the men's smoking room. This cabin also housed the helmsman, with whom the captain communicated by a bell signal. The captain also communicated with the engine room by means of a mechanical signalling device.

=== Machinery ===
For all the attention devoted to passenger comforts, the directors of the Collins Line well understood that the success of their venture depended primarily upon speed. After a careful study of the powerplants of the Cunard Line, Baltic was fitted with a pair of 96-inch cylinder, 10-foot stroke side-lever engines built by the Allaire Iron Works of New York. The engines produced about 500 horsepower each and delivered a speed of between 12 and 13 knots. The running gear was designed in such a way that if one engine failed, the remaining engine could continue to supply power to both paddlewheels. Steam was supplied by four vertical tubular boilers with a double row of furnaces, designed by the Line's chief engineer, John Faron.

While this machinery would prove capable of outperforming the opposition, the downside was economy of operation. Fuel consumption for Baltic reached between 75 and 85 tons of coal per day, more than twice as much as the 35 to 45 tons a day for her Cunard Line competitors.

== Service history ==
=== Collins Line ===
Baltic was launched in New York on 5 February 1850, and set out on her maiden voyage from New York to Liverpool, United Kingdom on 16 November, a route she would maintain for the next eight years. Between 6 and 16 August the following year, Baltic made a record passage from Liverpool to New York of 9 days, 19 hours and 26 minutes at an average speed of 12.91 knots, beating the record of 12.46 knots set the previous year by her sister ship Pacific and thus winning the coveted Blue Riband for fastest transatlantic passage.

As the chief advantage of the Collins Line over its competitor the Cunard Line was speed, it was considered imperative to make every effort to ensure this advantage was maintained regardless of cost. This policy frequently resulted in costly repairs as the ships' engines were continually pushed to the limit. By 1852 it was clear to the owners that the existing government mail subsidy of $19,250 per voyage was insufficient, and the Line returned to Congress to request an increase in the subsidy to $33,000 per voyage. The government granted this request, and it was additionally decided to increase the number of voyages from 20 to 26 per annum, resulting in a total increase of the annual subsidy from $385,000 to $858,000. Competition between the two Lines had reduced freight rates considerably however, and even this new subsidy was not sufficient to prevent the company from continuing to lose money.

In 1853, Baltic's mizzen (third) mast was removed. From 28 June to July 7, 1854, Baltic set a new Blue Riband record with a passage from Liverpool to New York of 9 days, 16 hours and 52 minutes at an average speed of 13.04 knots. Baltic remained the fastest ship on the Atlantic from her first record breaking run in August 1851 until April 1856, when the Cunard liner RMS Persia set a new record with an average speed of 13.11 knots. Almost a century would pass before another American ship, the SS United States, was to regain the honor.

On 27 September 1854, Baltic's sister ship Arctic suffered a collision with the French screw-steamer Vesta and sank with heavy loss of life. Two years later, another of the four Collins Line steamers, Pacific, sailed from Liverpool on January 23, 1856 with almost 200 passengers and crew and was never heard from again. Loss of these two ships—which some blamed upon the Line's emphasis on speed—caused serious financial harm to the company and also damaged its reputation. To make matters worse, Congress rescinded its generous subsidy to the Line in 1857, reducing it from $33,000 per voyage back to the original $19,250.

On 3 February 1858, Baltic began her last crossing on the Liverpool-New York route, arriving at her destination on the 18th. This was to be the final transatlantic crossing made by a Collins Line ship. On 1 April 1858, the assets of the financially troubled company were seized, and Baltic and Atlantic were sold to a creditor for the sum of $50,000.

=== Later service ===
Baltic and Atlantic were laid up for more than a year after the Collins Line failure, but on 9 July the two ships were purchased by the North Atlantic Steamship Company which put them to work as coastal steamers on the New York to Aspinwall route. Baltic and Atlantic continued to service this route until March 1860 when they were again laid up, as the company had been unsuccessful in its bid to secure a mail subsidy from the government.

With the outbreak of the American Civil War in April 1861, Baltic and Atlantic were both leased by the U.S. government for use as transports at a rate of $1,500 per day. They continued to operate in this role for the duration of the war, with the lease rate dropping to $1,200 in 1863 and $1,000 a day by 1865.

After the war, Baltic and Atlantic were both purchased by Ruger Brothers & Associates, whose directors included William H. Webb and E. W. Barstow, to operate for the newly established North American Lloyd Line. Baltic began the first of two round voyages for the Lloyd Line between New York and Bremen, with a stopover at Southampton on 26 April 1866. The Lloyd Line proved unprofitable and was quickly withdrawn, and Baltic subsequently made five round voyages between New York, Southampton and Bremen for the New York and Bremen Steamship Company, the first of which commenced on 21 February 1867 and the last of which began on 21 October.

Baltic was sold in 1870 to interests in Boston, Massachusetts, who removed the ship's engines and used her as a sailing vessel. She was broken up in 1880.

== Footnotes ==
Records
Preceded by Pacific	Holder of the Blue Riband (Westbound); 1851–1856	Succeeded by Persia
