= Atlantic (1849 ship) =

American steamship

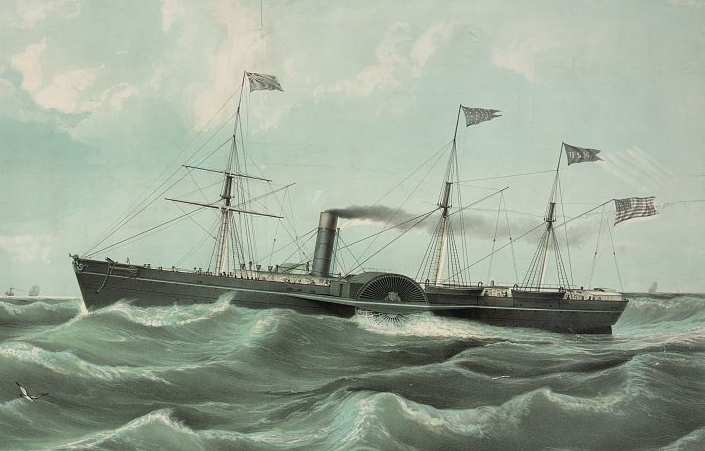
- Atlantic as originally constructed

United States
- Name: Atlantic
- Namesake: Atlantic Ocean
- Owner: Collins Line
- Builder: William H Brown, New York
- Launched: February 1, 1849
- Maiden voyage: April 27, 1850
- Out of service: 1871
- Identification: Signal Letters: H. B. V. D.; Official number: 802
- Fate: Broken up in 1871

General characteristics
- Displacement: 2,668 tons
- Length: 284 ft (87 m)
- Beam: 45 ft 11 in (14.00 m)
- Depth of hold: 22 ft 11.5 in (6.998 m)
- Propulsion: sail and steam engine
- Sail plan: 3-masted bark
- Speed: 12 knots
- Capacity: Passengers: 200 1st class, 80 2nd class

Atlantic was a wooden-hulled, side-wheel steamship launched in 1849. She was conceived as a part of an American fleet which would break the monopoly that European steamers, notably the Cunard Line, had on trans-Atlantic trade. She was the most successful of the Collins Line ships, and one of the most luxurious vessels of her day, but the company went bankrupt in 1858.

She was chartered by the Quartermaster Corps of the United States Army for much of the American Civil War. She supported the army's logistical requirements during major assaults, ran routine supply missions, and evacuated casualties, among other missions.

After the war, Atlantic was primarily used to bring German immigrants to the United States.

Over the course of her career, Atlantic completed sixty-six trans-Atlantic roundtrips, more than any other American side-wheel steamship.

== Construction and characteristics ==
In 1846, Edward K. Collins made a proposal to the United States Post Office. In return for a $385,000 annual subsidy, Collins would build a fleet of five ships that would sail between New York and Liverpool, carrying the mail, twice a month in the eight months of the year when the stormy North Atlantic was reasonably calm. He won the contract and established the New York and Liverpool United States Mail Steamship Company, which was universally shortened in common parlance to the Collins Line. Stewart Brown, and James Brown, representing the private banking firm Brown Brothers, were partners and financial backers of the company. United States Navy personnel supervised the design and construction of the Collins fleet, including Atlantic, so as to enable its vessels to be readily converted to warships, should the need arise.

Atlantic and Pacific were the first of the Collins Line ships which were built. Atlantic was built in the shipyard of William H. Brown at the foot of 12th street on the East River. The foreman on the job was George Steers. The hull was made of wood, reinforced with diagonal iron strapping. In consideration of her prospective service in the North Atlantic, she was built stoutly. The iron straps, 5" wide, and 1" thick, weighed 50 tons alone. A significant innovation in her design was her straight stem and lack of a bowsprit. This marked the ship as evolving toward greater reliance on steam rather than sail power. Both Atlantic and Pacific were launched on February 1, 1849. Atlantic's boilers, engines, and other machinery were added once the ship was afloat, so she was not ready for sea until the following year.

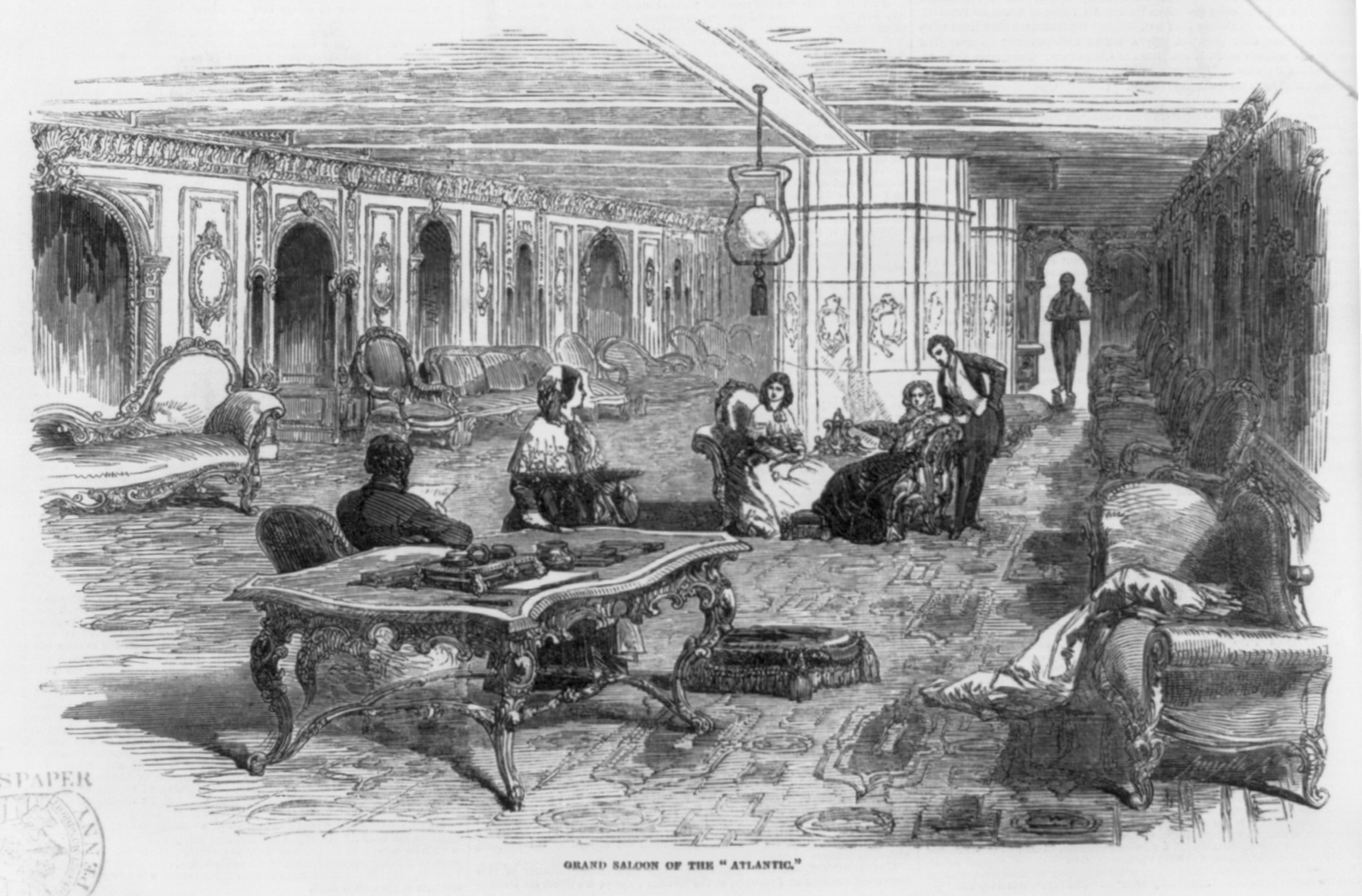
Grand saloon of the Atlantic in 1850

Atlantic was 284 feet (87 m) long with a beam of 45 ft 11 in (14.00 m), and a depth of hold of 22 feet 11.5 inches (6.998 m). She displaced 2,668 tons. As originally constructed, she had three decks, the spar deck, the main deck, and the lower deck. The spar deck had cabins for the ship's officers, the galley, barber shop, and a smoking room. The smoking room could be accessed from the main deck by an internal staircase so that passengers would not have to expose themselves to the weather. The main deck included the great saloon, 67 feet (20 m) long, and the dining saloon, 60 feet (18 m) long. Both rooms were 20 feet (6.1 m) wide. The two rooms were separated by the steward's pantry where dishes, silverware, and other table ware were stored. The two saloons were paneled in rosewood, satinwood, and olive wood, and were carpeted. Meals were lowered from the galley on the spar deck to the dining saloon in dumbwaiters. The dining tables had marble tops. The walls were decorated with emblems of each state of the Union, and the cabin windows were painted glass with the coats of arms of major cities in the United States. A separate ladies drawing room was also on the main deck. The passenger cabins were on the main deck, outboard of the saloons on both sides of the ship. There was no provision for steerage passengers on Atlantic. She carried a crew of 170.

Atlantic had four coal-fired boilers to provide steam for her engines. She had two side-lever steam engines manufactured by the Novelty Iron Works of New York. The engines were large, each with a single cylinder with a bore of 95 inches (240 cm) and a stroke of 9 feet (2.7 m). The bed plate alone for one of these engines weighed 34 tons. The boilers consumed enormous quantities of coal, about 85 tons each day. These engines generated power variously reported as between 500 and 1000 horsepower each. Each engine drove a paddlewheel that was 36 feet (11 m) in diameter, each with 36 paddles. The ship was able to average 12 knots on a trans-Atlantic voyage.

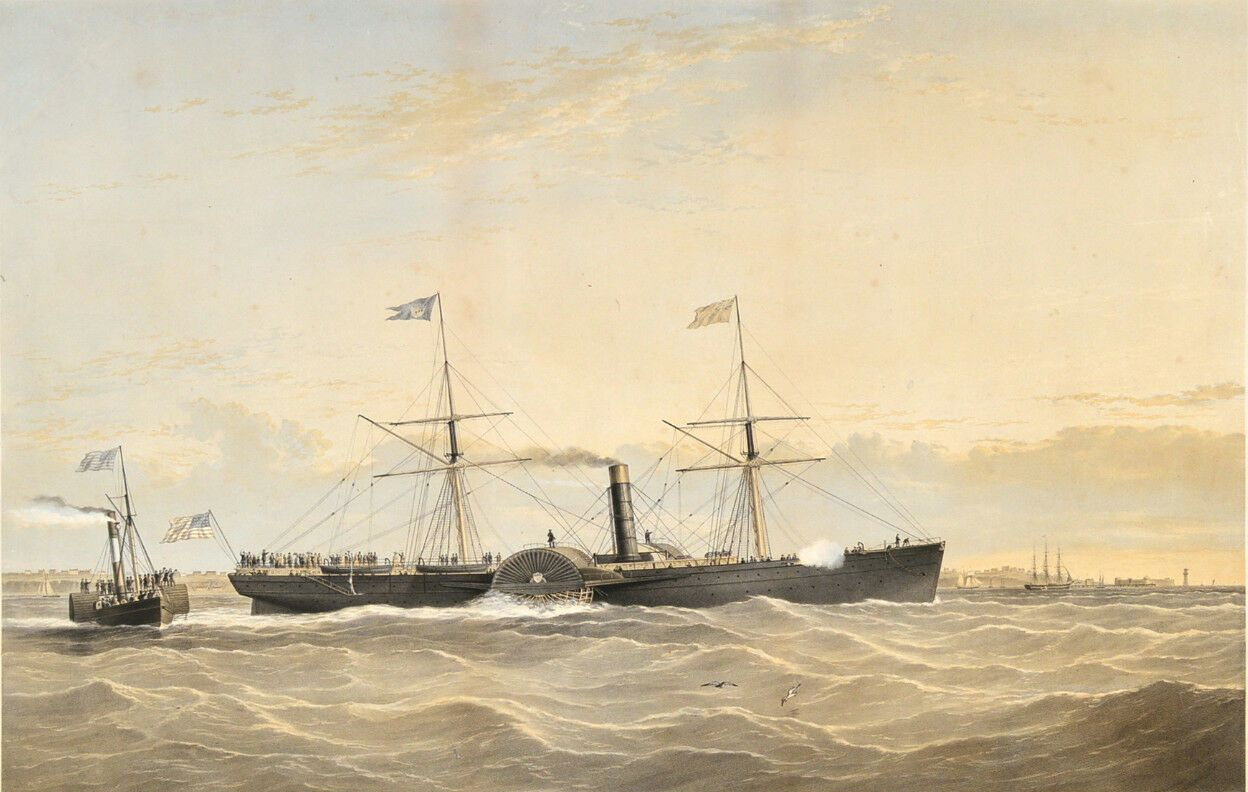
Atlantic in 1855, after her mizzen mast was removed.

As originally constructed, Atlantic had three masts and was rigged as a bark. In 1853 or 1854 the mizzen mast was removed increasing her dependence on her steam engines for propulsion.

The first four Collins Line ships cost just under $3 million to build, suggesting that Atlantic's original cost was approximately $750,000.

== New York and Liverpool United States Mail Steamship Company (1850–1858) ==
Atlantic departed New York for Liverpool on her maiden voyage on April 27, 1850. She reached port on May 10, but not without teething troubles. Just over half way across, the ship was stopped to repair the loss of paddles in heavy seas. She drifted for 12 hours while repairs were effected. Then one of the engines had to be shut down due to a valve failure, cutting the ship's speed by a third. Nonetheless, when all her machinery was working, she made almost 300 miles a day, a creditable speed for 1850. She proved that she could achieve these respectable speeds all the way across the Atlantic when she reached New York in July 1850 only 10 days and fifteen hours after leaving her dock in Liverpool. This was just an hour and twenty minutes behind Cunard's Asia which, at the time, held the blue riband for the fastest trans-Atlantic voyage. Atlantic's speed was very competitive for her time.

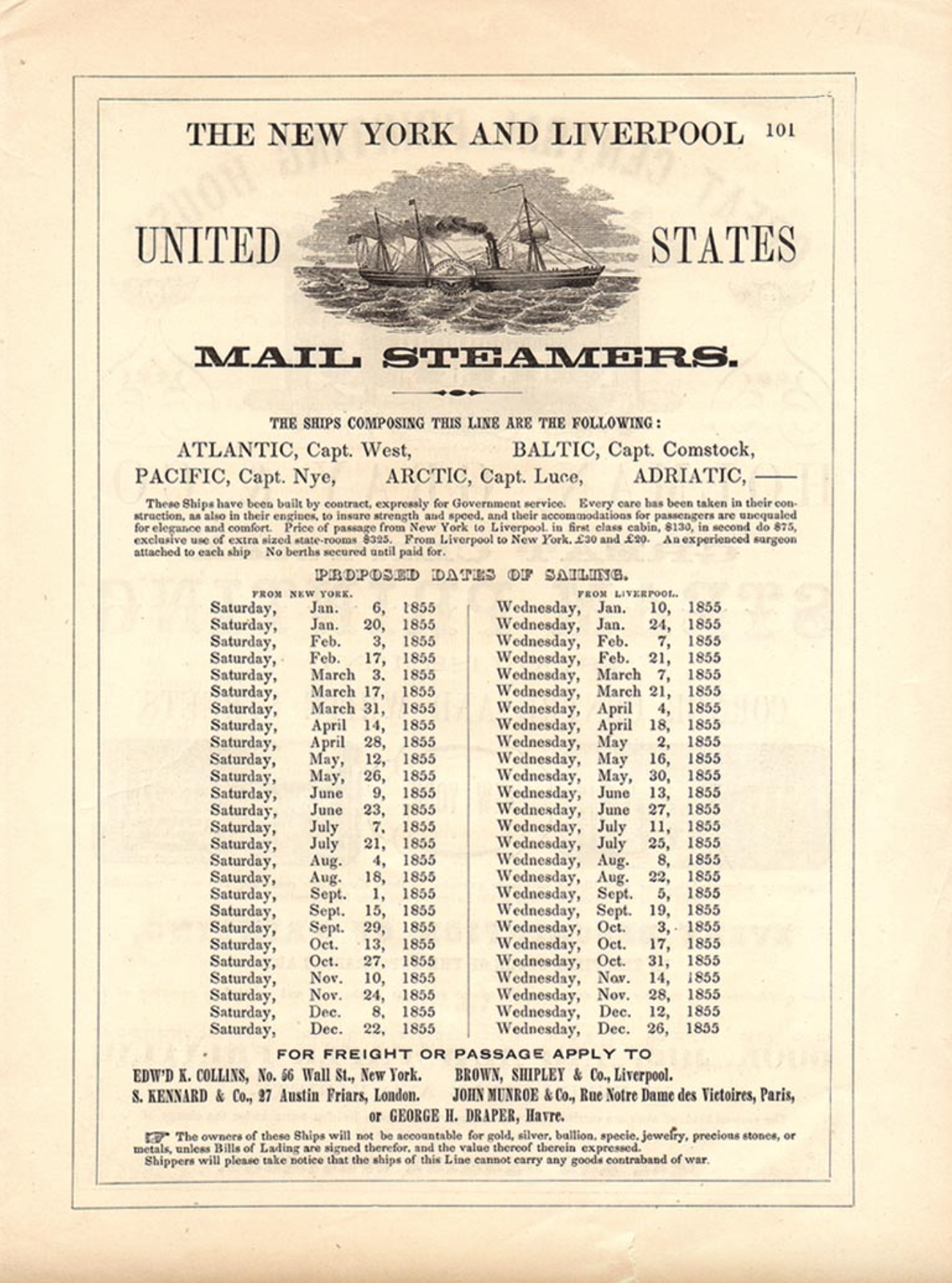
1855 sailing schedule for the Collins Line

Atlantic and the other Collins Line ships were more than just fast. They were among the most luxurious of their day. Consequently, traveling on them was more expensive than on lesser ships, one newspaper commenting that, "The superior comforts she offers will cause the extra $10 passage money to be disregarded." The luxuries attracted the rich and famous. Among the notables to sail on Atlantic were singer Jenny Lind, President Millard Fillmore, President James Buchanan, Vice President George M. Dallas, Ambassador to France, John Y. Mason, Ambassador to Russia Thomas H. Seymour, Gaetano Bedini, the first Papal Nuncio to the United States, theater entrepreneur William Niblo, and Philanthropist George Peabody.

For most of her career with the Collins Line, Atlantic rotated with Pacific, Baltic, and Arctic in regular ocean crossings. She completed a round trip, including loading and unloading in New York and Liverpool in about a month. For the most part, these trips were uneventful, but within her first year she suffered a major breakdown. Atlantic left Liverpool on December 29, 1850, and soon encountered stormy weather and rough seas. On January 6, 1851, the drive shaft for her starboard paddlewheel broke, and in doing so, wrecked several related pieces of machinery before the engine was shut down. Her captain ordered the crew to send up the yardarms for her square-rigged sails hoping to sail to Halifax or New York. The wind turned contrary, however, and the ship was forced to sail back to Europe. She arrived in Cork, Ireland on January 22, 1851. Her passengers were transferred to other ships, and Atlantic was towed to Liverpool for repairs.

It took a half year to repair the ship. While waiting for her engine to be repaired, a new dining room, suitable for serving 200 guests, was constructed on the spar deck. The old dining room, one level down on the main deck, was converted into rooms for 80 additional passengers. She arrived back in New York on August 3, 1851, to resume her monthly sailings, and although she was withdrawn from service periodically for repairs and upgrades, Atlantic continued them with regularity through 1857.

Atlantic had a minor scrape on April 28, 1852, when she ran aground in a dense fog near Killmore. She was able to work her way back into deep water and arrived at Liverpool the next day. She went aground again, this time on Sandy Hook, New Jersey, in March 1854. This was a particularly unlucky trip. While she floated off at high tide, she went aground again the next day after clearing customs in New York Harbor.

The North Atlantic was typically stormy during the winter months, so while Atlantic might carry over two hundred passengers on a summer crossing, there might be fewer than fifty willing to brave the discomfort and risk of a winter voyage. Several winter sailings were delayed by ice on the Hudson River.

The Collins Line suffered a number of setbacks in the mid-1850s. It lost Pacific and Arctic to shipwreck. In August 1856 Congress reduced the mail subsidy, which had risen to $858,000 per year, back to its original $385,000. The surviving ships, Atlantic and Baltic, were worked hard for less profit. In March 1857, Atlantic was withdrawn from service for repairs and was replaced by a chartered ship which was slower and less luxurious, eroding the Collins Line's reputation for superior service. Atlantic returned to service in late June 1857, but she was becoming less attractive to customers. Newer vessels, such as Vanderbilt, were speedier. On January 6, 1858, Atlantic returned to New York from Liverpool for the last time as a Collins Line steamer. She had completed 55 trans-Atlantic roundtrips, the most of any of Collins' ships. The Collins Line was bankrupt.

On April 1, 1858, Dudley B. Fuller, acting on behalf of the Brown brothers, was the sole bidder for Atlantic, Baltic, and Adriatic at a sheriff's auction. He bid only $50,000 which left various government and private creditors seeking recompense, mired in failed sale attempts and litigation for years.

== North Atlantic Steamship Company (1859–1860) ==
In 1859, the first trans-continental rail line was still a decade away. The fastest way to travel between the east and west coasts of the United States was to take a steamer from New York to Panama, take the Panama Railroad across the isthmus, and then take another steamer to San Francisco. Prior to 1859, the Pacific Mail Steamship Company served the west coast part of this route while the U.S. Mail Steamship Company served the east coast portion. Both lines depended on the subsidies from the U.S. Post Office for their profitability. When these contracts were due for renewal in 1859, the U.S. Mail Steamship Company chose to sell its assets and retire from the business. In response to losing its Atlantic partner, the Pacific Mail Steamship Company created the North Atlantic Steamship Company in conjunction with the Panama Railroad. The steamship company contributed $400,000 in cash, while the railroad contributed $500,000. The new company bought the three remaining Collins Line ships, including Atlantic, from the Brown brothers in 1859 for $900,000, half in cash and half in Pacific Mail Steamship Company stock.

Atlantic was extensively modified for her new job. New cabins were built on her spar deck for first and second class passengers, while the staterooms on the main deck were removed to create space for hundreds of steerage berths.

On October 20, 1859, Atlantic put to sea for the first time in a year and a half. She sailed from the former Collins Line wharf at the foot of Canal Street for Aspinwall, Panama. She was no longer a luxury liner for a few dozen rich and famous. She had on board perhaps 1,000 people, including 250 troops from the U.S. Army's Fourth and Ninth Regiments bound for General William Harney's command in the Pacific Northwest. She arrived back in New York on November 10, 1859 with 340 Californians returning to the eastern United States, and $1.6 million of their gold.

On her second roundtrip to Panama, which returned on December 12, 1859, she carried among her passengers Lieutenant General Winfield Scott, returning from a successful resolution of a border dispute with Britain in the Pacific Northwest. In all, Atlantic completed five roundtrips to Panama before this service was abandoned at the start of the Civil War.

== Civil War Service (1861–1865) ==
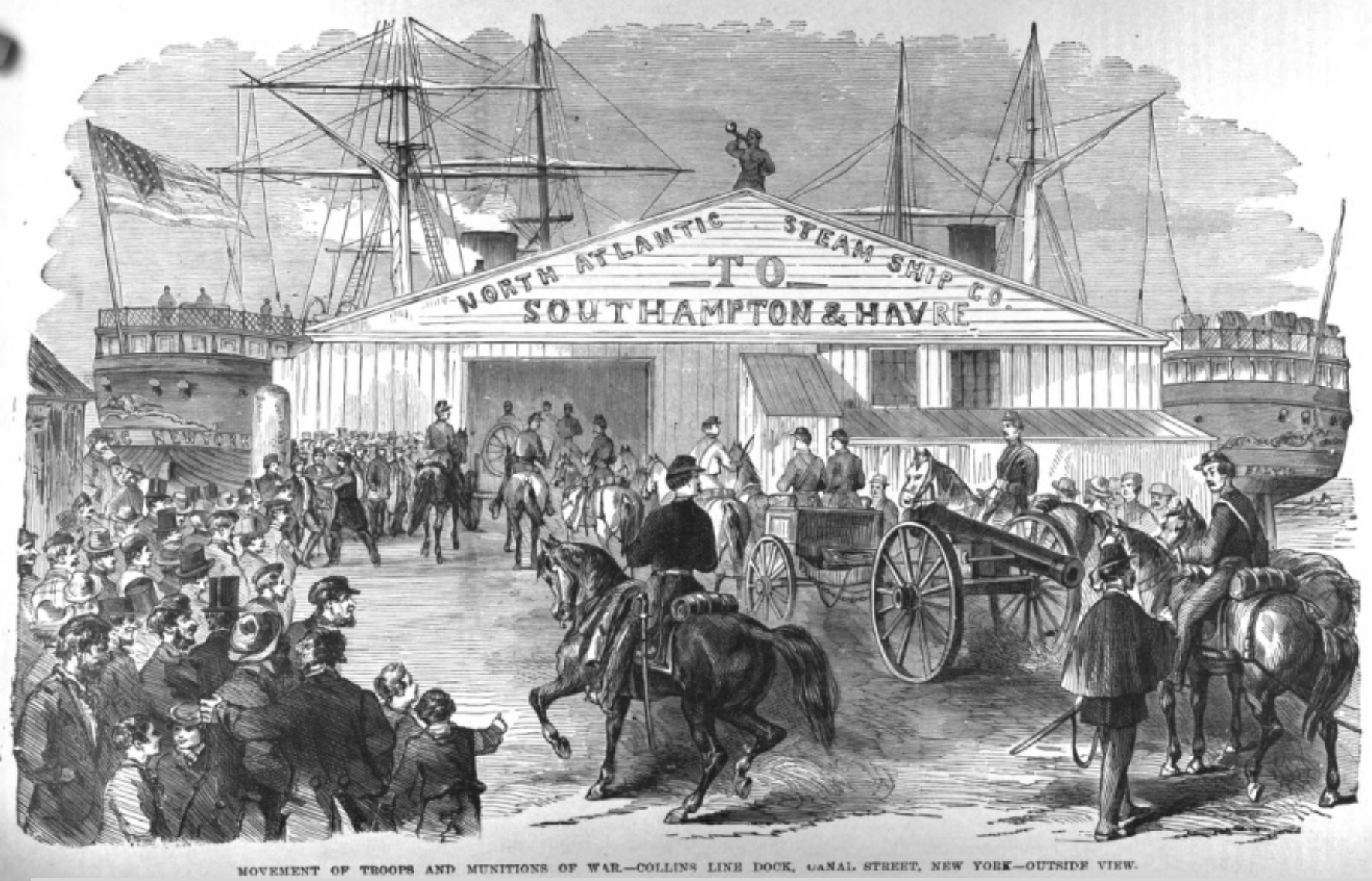
Atlantic (left) and Baltic (right) loading Union artillery April 6, 1861 from the former Collins Line wharf on Canal Street in Manhattan

Atlantic was chartered by the Quartermaster Corps of the United States Army on April 5, 1861, for the first of nine periods during the Civil War at rates that varied from $2,000 per day to $1,000 per day. Her role was to provide logistical support for army operations against the Confederate Atlantic and Gulf coasts.

Army charters of Atlantic
| Start date | Expiration Date | Fee per Day | Primary role |
|---|---|---|---|
| April 5, 1861 | Unknown | $2,000 | Reinforcement of Fort Pickens |
| September 25, 1861 | Unknown | $1,500 | |
| October 5, 1861 | Unknown | $1,500 | Assault on Port Royal |
| June 30, 1862 | September 5, 1862 | $1,200 | Hospital ship in Peninsula Campaign |
| October 30, 1862 | January 11, 1863 | $1,200 | Hospital ship in Peninsula Campaign |
| August 15, 1863 | August 31, 1863 | $1,000 | |
| January 21, 1864 | February 29, 1864 | $1,000 | |
| June 28, 1864 | December 3, 1864 | $1,000 | |
| December 31, 1864 | March 28, 1865 | $1,000 | Assault on Fort Fisher |

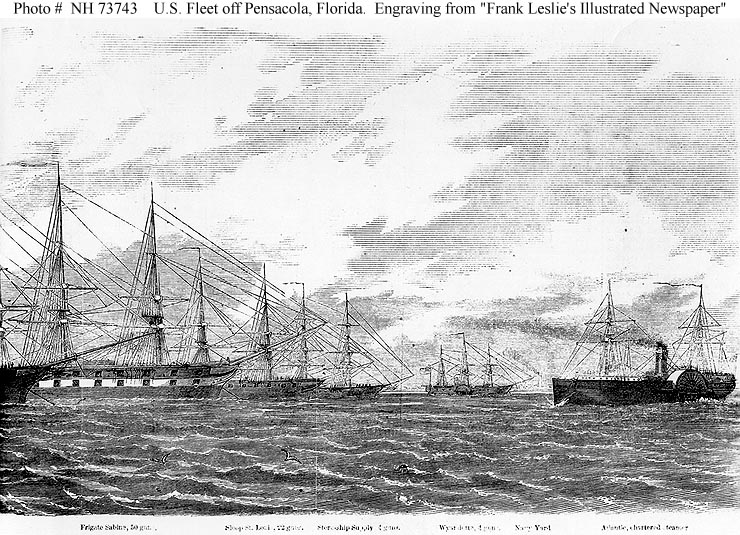
Atlantic (right) among the Union fleet reinforcing Fort Pickens in 1861

On April 6, 1861, Atlantic sailed from the former Collins Line wharf on Canal Street in Manhattan with 358 troops, 78 horses, artillery, food, and other supplies. She stopped at Fort Taylor at Key West, Florida and embarked additional troops, stopped at Fort Jefferson at Dry Tortugas, Florida, and sailed on to Pensacola, Florida. Her troops and supplies reinforced Fort Pickens, which the Union was able to use as a base throughout the Civil War. Confederate sympathizers refused to sell her coal, so Atlantic sailed to Havana for fuel on the return journey to New York.

In July 1861, Atlantic sailed from the Brooklyn Navy Yard to Washington, D.C., with ordinance supplies, including eight heavy guns.

In October 1861, the Union mounted an expedition to capture Port Royal on the South Carolina coast. The 3rd New Hampshire Infantry Regiment was embarked on Atlantic. The ship also served as the headquarters of the army component of the expedition under General Thomas Sherman. The expedition was successful, and Atlantic sailed a second round-trip to Port Royal carrying supplies for the troops ashore. Among the items in her hold was a printing press for the New South newspaper, one of the first occupation newspapers established by the Union. She returned to New York on December 20, 1861. She had in her hold 120,000 pounds of cotton which was sold to fund the war effort. She was towing USS R. B. Forbes, which had suffered a mechanical breakdown. This set a pattern for many of her subsequent trips to Port Royal. She carried military supplies south and captured commodities, mostly cotton, north.

On her April 1862 round trip to Port Royal she saw both the highest and lowest status passengers. She carried Major General David Hunter, the new commander of the Department of the South, on her outbound trip, and 85 Confederate prisoners of war captured at Fort Pulaski, on her return. In July 1862, Atlantic began serving as a hospital ship, transporting wounded and ill soldiers from the Peninsula Campaign to hospitals in the North. In August 1862 she transported 615 sick and wounded men from Fortress Monroe, in September 800 invalids from Alexandria, and in October nearly 1,500 more.

In January 1863 Atlantic was pulled out of service for maintenance. She was hauled out in the East River on the Great Balance Dock, at the time the largest floating dry dock in the world, and had her hull stripped, caulked, and re-coppered. After a brief Army charter in the summer of 1863, Atlantic sailed her one commercial trip during the Civil War. The Panama Railroad, one of her owners, used her to carry freight to Aspinwall. She left New York on November 25, 1863, and arrived back on December 27, 1863. Several creditors of the Collins Line sought and failed to obtain injunctions to stop this trip as the bankruptcy litigation continued in its fifth year. Within a month of her return, the Army had chartered her again, and the ship spent the rest of the war shuttling among New York and the other Union-controlled ports on the Atlantic coast. She carried troops, sick and wounded, prisoners of war, and stores of all kinds. Perhaps her final dramatic mission of the war was to carry the 112th New York Infantry Regiment to the second assault on Fort Fisher in January 1865.

== Pacific Mail Steamship Company (1865–1866) ==
In September 1865, the Pacific Mail Steamship Company acquired a major competitor, the Atlantic Mail Steamship Company, under terms that were favorable to Cornelius Vanderbilt, leader of the acquired company. Having eliminated its competitor, the Pacific Mail Steamship Company faced a sudden increase in the number of passengers it served between New York and Aspinwall. The company had two large steamers under construction, but until they were completed, Atlantic was pressed into service on her pre-war Panama route.

Atlantic resumed her sailings between New York and Aspinwall on November 11, 1865. She completed three round trips, arriving back in New York on February 1, 1866.

== North American Lloyd Steamship Company (1866) ==
Immigrants to America were typically poor, and thus fares on immigrant ships had to be kept low. The Ruger Brothers, who had strong links to Northern Europe, had a plan to keep costs low. They used older, slower, less attractive, and thus cheaper ships. By February 1866, Atlantic fit this description and the Rugers bought the ship for their North American Lloyd Steamship Company.

Atlantic left New York on her inaugural trip for her new line on February 22, 1866. She reached Cowes in the United Kingdom on March 10, and Bremerhaven the next day. She returned to New York with 900 passengers aboard on April 9, 1866. Her April sailing was even more successful, returning to New York with 1,138 passengers, mostly immigrants, 3 of whom were born en route. Her July arrival brought another 1,020 passengers. The cheap fares filled the ship: first cabin passage cost $105, second cabin $62, and a steerage berth $37.50. Atlantic returned to New York on September 25, 1866 with another 1,156 passengers.

Filling the ship did not translate to financial success. The North American Lloyd Steamship Company ran into trouble with its creditors in October and ceased operations. Atlantic was seized by Kings County sheriffs. It appears that the Pacific Mail Steamship Company loaned the Rugers much of the money they used to purchase the ship, since when the bankruptcy proceedings concluded, it owned the ship again.

== New York and Bremen Steamship Company (1867–1868) ==
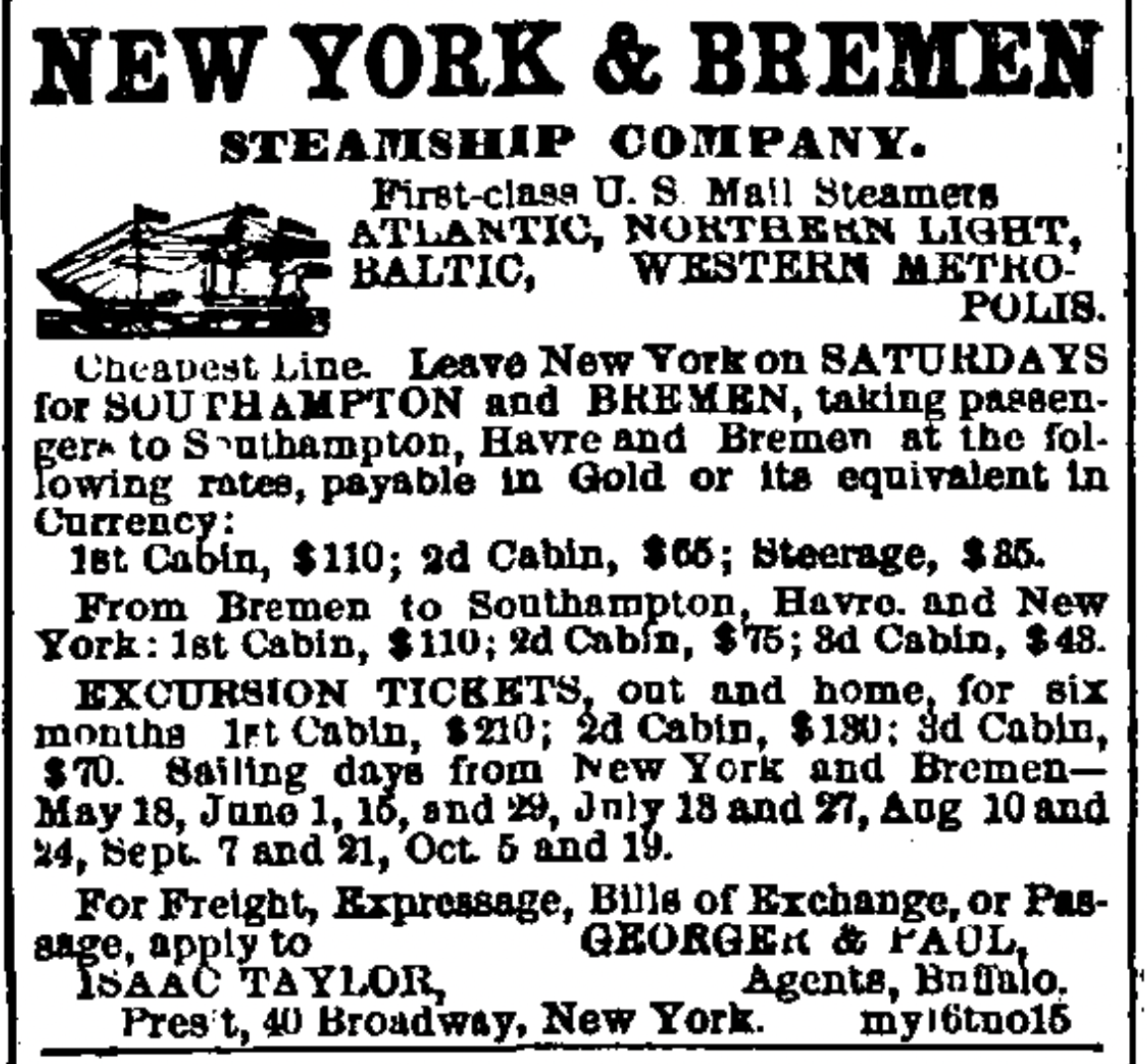
New York and Bremen Steamship Company advertisement from July 11, 1867

In January 1867, the New York and Bremen Steamship Company was formed. The Pacific Mail Steamship Company sold the new company Atlantic and Baltic, while Charles Lulling contributed Western Metropolis. As with her previous owner, Atlantic's purchase was funded by debt advanced by the Pacific Mail Steamship Company. While the ownership was different, the new company had the same operational plan as the Rugers. It would charge cheap fares and fill Atlantic with immigrants from Northern Europe.

U.S. Marshalls seized Atlantic over $61,000 of unpaid repair bills in early February 1867. This apparently got the bill paid, as the ship sailed on her first trip for her new company on February 7, 1867. She immediately ran aground on Sandy Hook. She was able to refloat herself and sailed on to Europe. She stopped in Bremerhaven and Southampton. On her return trip, she was beset by bad weather and high seas that slowed her trip, washed every loose object on deck overboard, and damaged her hull, lifeboats, and house. She reached New York at the end of this ill-starred trip on March 24, 1867, with 350 passengers aboard.

After her difficult first trip, Atlantic completed four uneventful roundtrips for the New York and Bremen Steamship Company during the summer of 1867. She carried hundreds, and on one sailing, over 1,000 passengers per trip back to New York. Her sixth trip was her last. On her return from Bremen, in late November 1867, she was met with a gale, snow and sleet, and heavy seas. Her steering system was damaged, skylights were broken, crew and the captain's cabins were crushed by waves, the forward lifeboats were swept away, and seven beams supporting the main deck were broken. The forward hatch was crushed, allowing water to rush into the ship. The flooding reached the bottom of the furnaces which created clouds of steam that scared the passengers. The wind was so strong that the sails blew out. As waves hit the ship, seams in her hull planking opened, contributing to the water in the bilge, but Atlantic's steam-powered pumps kept the ship afloat. While the gale eased after a day, the fog and snow continued to reduce visibility, delaying the ship's return to New York until December 13, 1867. She never sailed under her own power again.

As with the North American Lloyd Steamship Company, the New York and Bremen Steamship Company could not meet its financial obligations by charging low fares to immigrants. The New York and Bremen Steamship Company ceased operations, and on June 30, 1868 Atlantic was sold at auction for $41,000.

== Obsolescence and breaking up (1868–1871) ==
Atlantic had always been expensive to operate. With her four boilers, the ship consumed large amounts of coal and required a large crew to tend her machinery. Hard usage, North Atlantic storms, and twenty years of technological progress had rendered the ship worn and uneconomic. She was anchored off Brooklyn in the Erie Basin to await her fate. Her new owner, William D. Andrews and Brother, failed to find a use or buyer for their ship. In the fall of 1871 Atlantic was towed to Cold Spring Harbor, New York and broken up for her iron and copper.
