= Sea lane =

Regularly used navigable route through a large body of water

A sea lane, sea road or shipping lane is a regularly used navigable route for large water vessels (ships) on wide waterways such as oceans and large lakes, and is preferably safe, direct and economic. During the Age of Sail, they were determined by the distribution of land masses but also by the prevailing winds, whose discovery was crucial for the success of long maritime voyages. Sea lanes are very important for seaborne trade.

== History ==
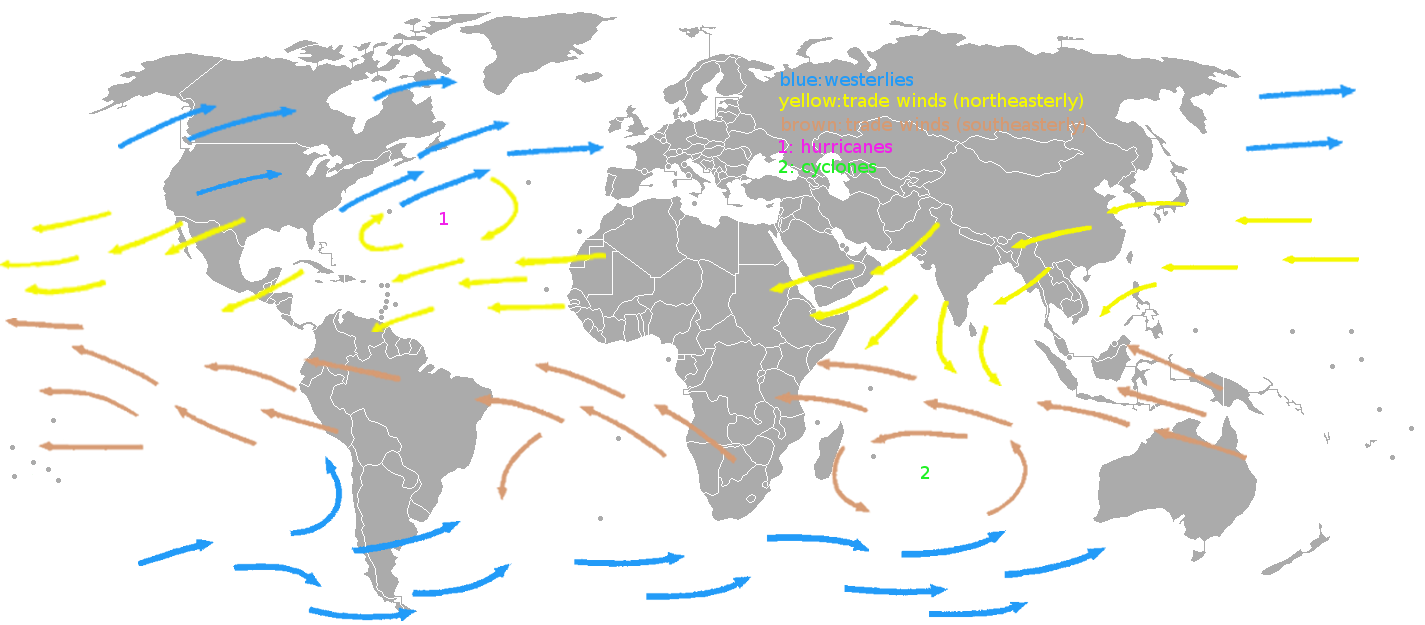
The westerlies and trade winds

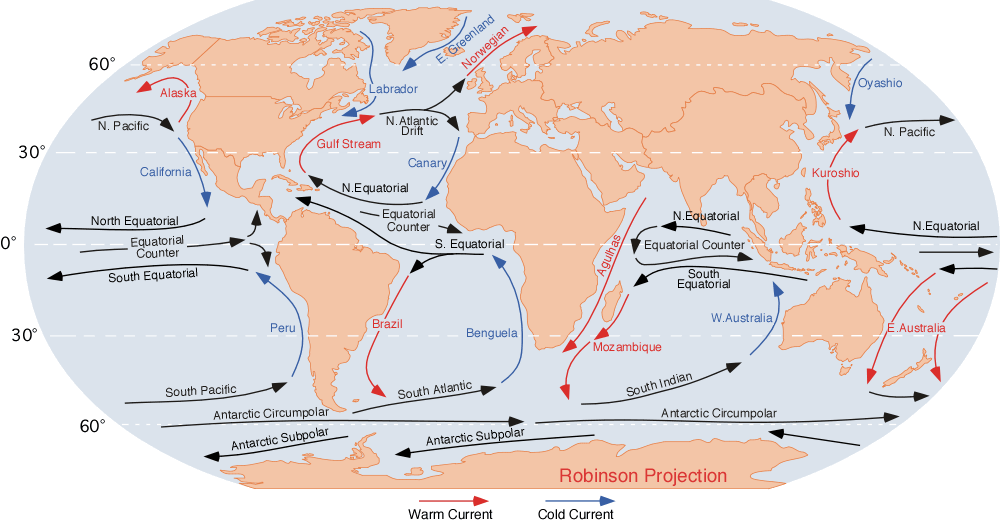
The ocean currents

The establishment of the North Atlantic sea lanes was inspired by the sinking of the US mail steamer SS Arctic by collision with the French steamer SS Vesta in October 1854 which resulted in the loss of over 300 lives, including the family of the Arctic's owner. Lieutenant M. F. Maury of the US Navy first published a section titled "Steam Lanes Across the Atlantic" in his 1855 Sailing Directions proposing sea lanes along the 42 degree latitude. A number of international conferences and committees were held in 1866, 1872, 1887, 1889, and 1891 all of which left the designation of sea lanes to the principal trans-Atlantic steamship companies at the time; Cunard, White Star, Inman, National Line, and Guion Lines. In 1913–1914 the International Convention for Safety of Life at Sea held in London again reaffirmed that the selection of routes across the Atlantic in both directions is left to the responsibility of the steamship companies.

Shipping lanes came to be by analysing the prevailing winds. The trade winds allowed ships to sail towards the west quickly, and the westerlies allowed ships to travel to the east quickly. As such, the sea lanes are mostly chosen to take full advantage of these winds. Currents are also similarly followed as well, which also gives an advantage to the vessel. Some routes, such as that from Cape Town to Rio de Janeiro (passing Tristan da Cunha), were not able to take advantage of these natural factors.

Main sea lanes may also attract pirates. Pax Britannica was the period from 1815–1914 during which the British Royal Navy controlled most of the key maritime trade routes, and also suppressed piracy and the slave trade. During World War I, as German U-boats began hitting American and British shipping, the Allied trade vessels began to move out of the usual sea lanes to be escorted by naval ships.

== Advantages ==
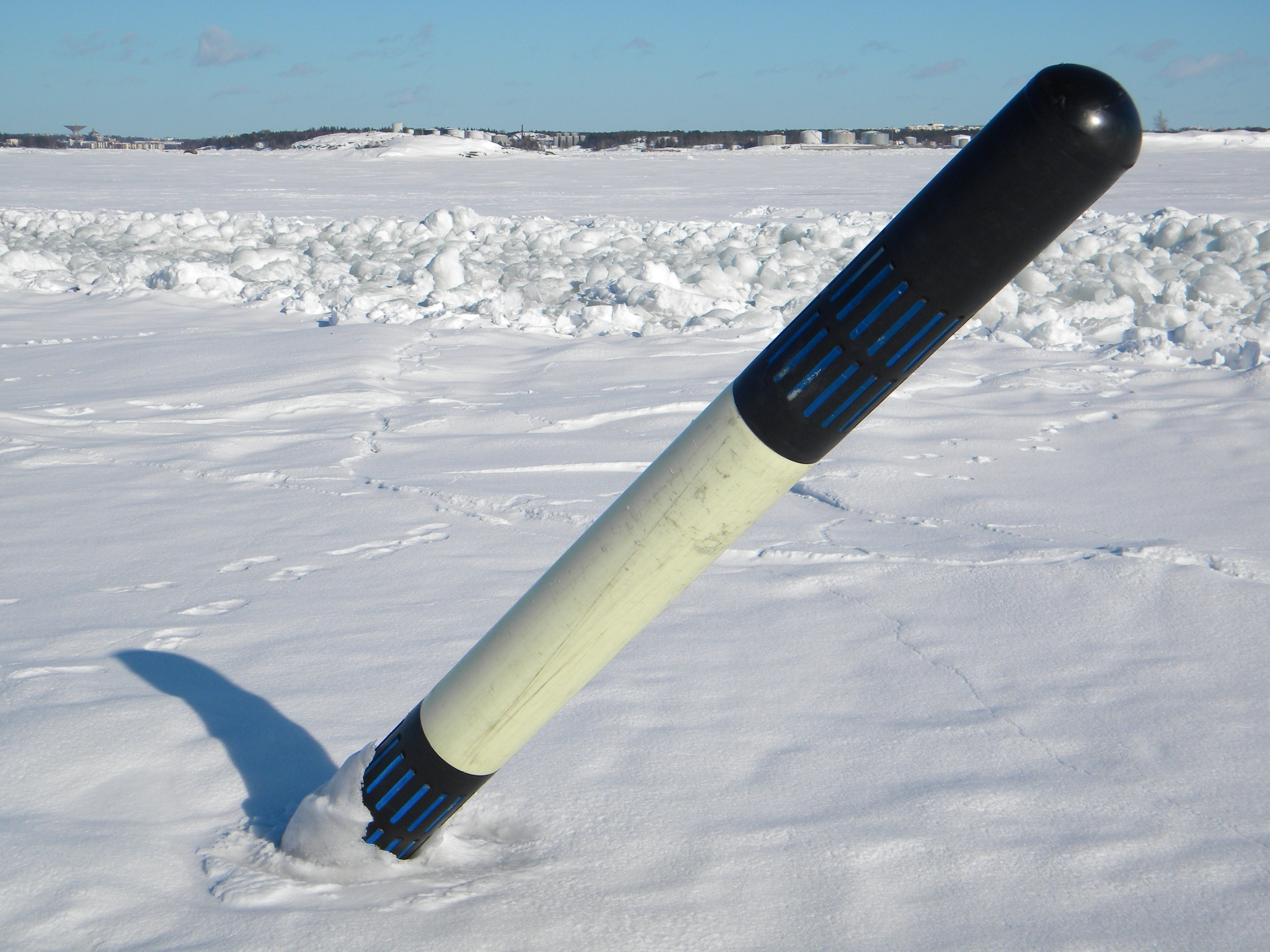
Behind the cardinal mark is a sea lane opened on an ice-covered sea.

Although most ships no longer use sails (having switched them for engines), the wind still creates waves, which can cause heeling. As such, following the overall direction of the trade winds and westerlies is still very useful. However, it is best for any vessel not engaged in trading or that is smaller than a certain length to avoid the sea lanes. This is not only because the slight chance of a collision with a large ship that can easily cause a smaller ship to sink, but also because large vessels are much less maneuverable than smaller ships, and need much more depth. Smaller ships can thus easily take courses that are nearer to the shore. Unlike with road traffic, there is no exact "road" a ship must follow, so this can easily be done.

Shipping lanes are the busiest parts of the sea, thus being a useful place for stranded boaters whose boats are sinking or people on a liferaft to boat to, and be rescued by a passing ship.

== Threats from shipping lanes ==
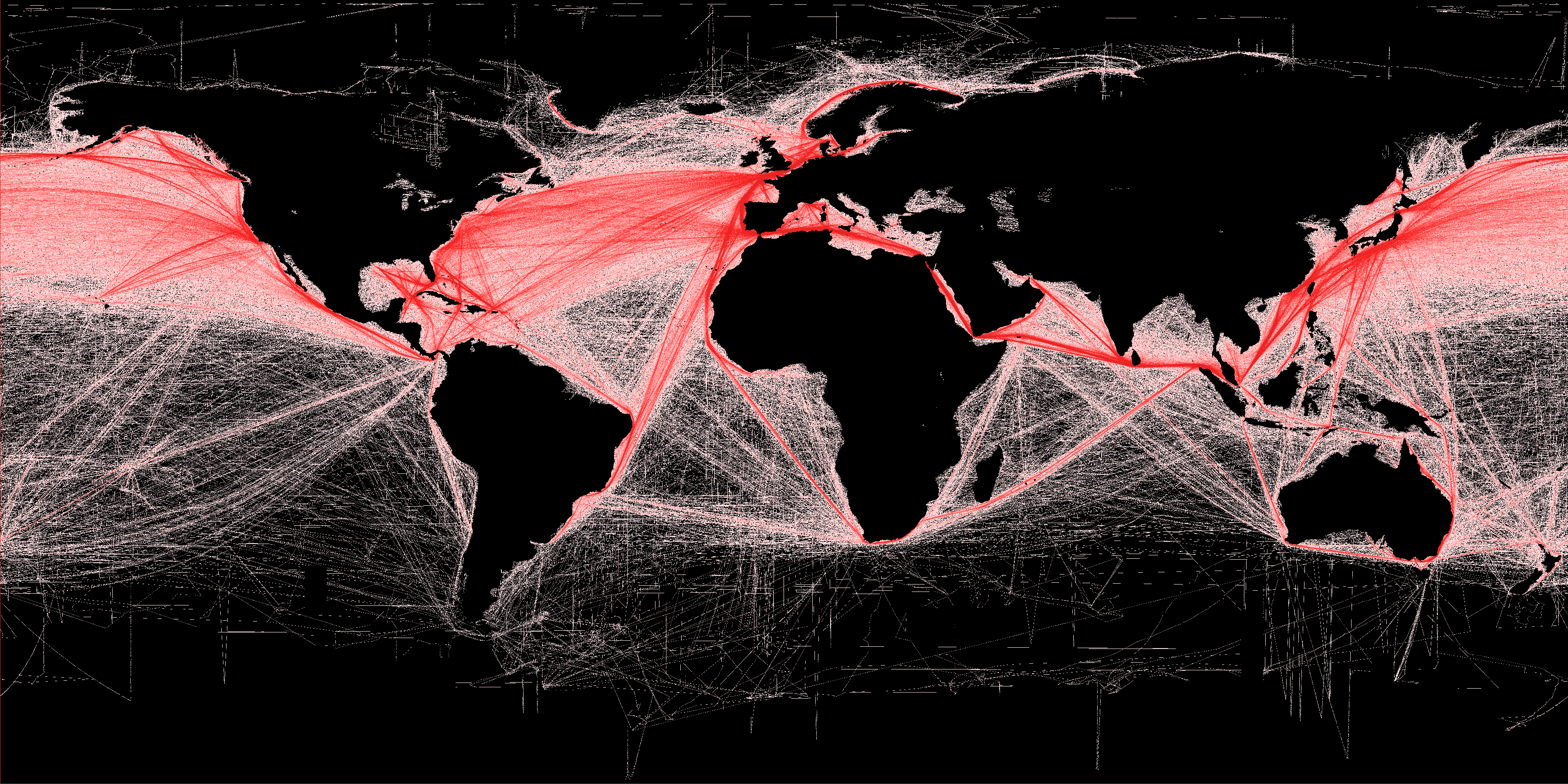
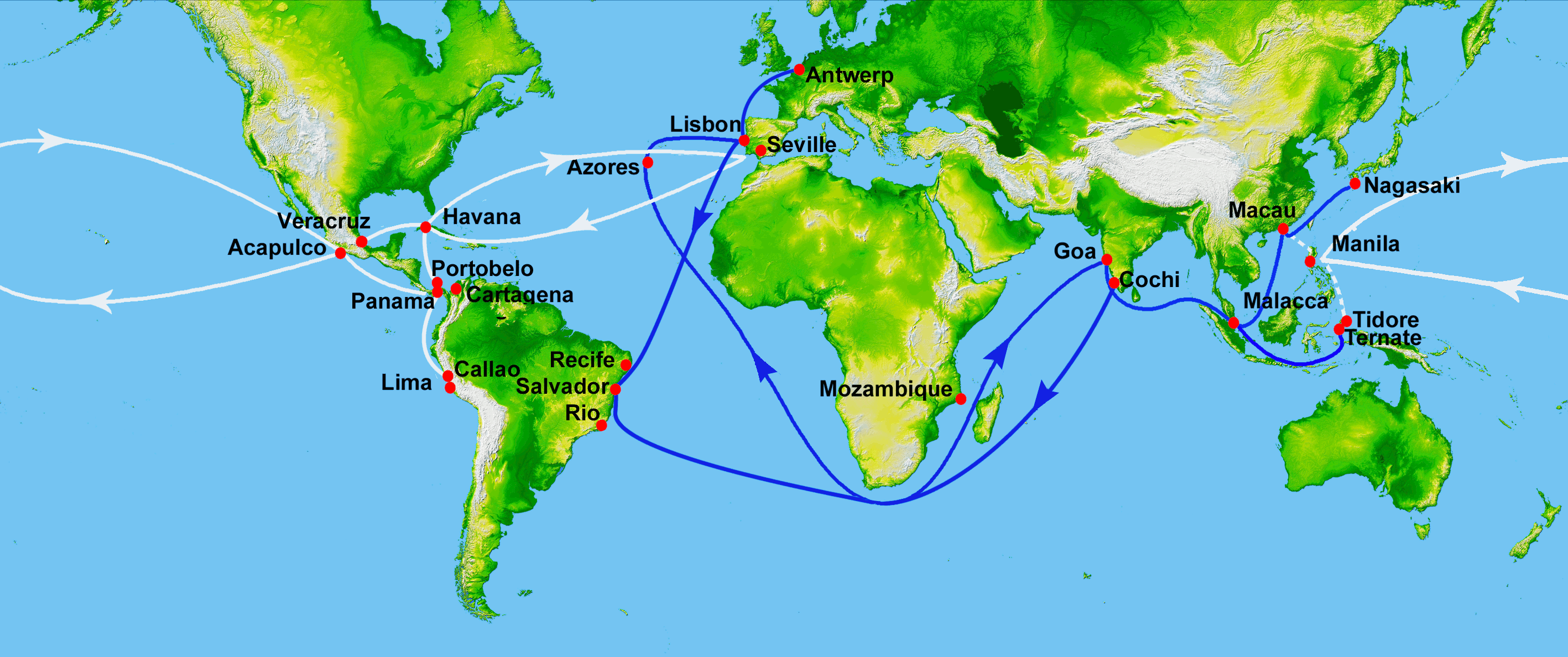
Left: This map of shipping routes illustrates the present-day density of commercial shipping in the world's oceans. Right: 16th century and current day trade routes prey to pirating and privateering.

Shipping lanes may pose threats to some ocean-going craft. Small boats risk conflicts with bigger ships if they follow the shipping lanes. Sections of lanes exist which can be shallow or have some kind of obstruction (such as sand banks). This threat is greatest when passing some narrows, such as between islands in the Indian Ocean (e.g. in Indonesia) as well as between islands in the Pacific (e.g. near the Marquesas islands, Tahiti). Some shipping lanes, such as the Straits of Malacca off Indonesia and Malaysia, and the waters off Somalia, are frequented by pirates operating independently or as privateers (for companies and countries). Passing ships run the risk of being attacked and held for ransom.

== Busiest shipping lanes ==
The world's busiest shipping lane is the Dover Strait, with 500–600 vessels passing through daily. In 1999, 1.4 billion tonnes gross, carried by 62,500 vessels, passed through the strait. The strait serves as a critical chokepoint for international trade, connecting the North Sea to the English Channel and facilitating maritime traffic between the Atlantic Ocean and key European ports. Its strategic importance has led to the implementation of advanced traffic separation schemes (TSS) and strict maritime regulations to prevent collisions and ensure safe navigation. Other major shipping lanes, such as the Strait of Malacca, the Panama Canal, and the Suez Canal, also play essential roles in global trade by enabling faster and more direct maritime routes. These lanes collectively handle a significant portion of the world's shipping traffic, underscoring their role as vital arteries of international commerce.

== See also ==
- Sea lines of communication
- Roadstead
- Trade route
