= Mahlon Day =

American publisher (1790–1854)

Mahlon Day (August 27, 1790 – September 27, 1854) was an American children's book publisher, printer, and bookseller, based in New York City.

== Biography ==
Mahlon Day was born on August 27, 1790, in Morristown, New Jersey.

Day, his wife and two daughters died on September 27, 1854, when the SS Arctic collided with the French steamship SS Vesta off the coast of Canada in thick fog, and only 22 out of 233 passengers survived, none of them women or children.

=== Descendants ===
Through his daughter Sarah, he was a grandfather, and namesake, of merchant Mahlon Day Sands.
