= American Free Trade League =

American Free Trade League was a free trade organization founded in Boston, Massachusetts, after the Civil War that advocated for the abolition of the tariff.

== History ==
The American Free Trade League was founded in Boston shortly after the U.S. Civil War. Among its founders was the economist and free trade theorist David Ames Wells. Their views were summed up thusly in 1865:

"The members of the American Free Trade League believe that by the adoption of Free Trade legislation the amount of revenue necessary to meet promptly all the engagements of the government, whether in specie or in currency, can be raised with less annoyance to the tax-payer than under any other system."

From the 1890s until the First World War, however, the League's activities were largely dormant. In 1916, publisher George Haven Putnam was elected president of the League. Putnam was based in New York City and was president of G. P. Putnam's Sons, the publishing house founded by his father. He was a "staunch free trade advocate and disciple of Wells," and he launched a "vigorous campaign aimed at combating the protectionist sentiment that was being generated by the war in Europe. Putnam correctly anticipated the wave of protective tariff legislation that was to follow the war. He believed that tariff barriers were one of the leading causes of war, and that their elimination would usher in a new era of peace and economic prosperity."

=== 1919 Split ===
A growing dispute over perceived pacifist views between League president was George Haven Putnam, who was based in New York City, and some members of the Boston group, including its secretary Kenneth B. Elliman and most of the executive committee who were based in Boston, resulted in a splitting up of the organization that led to the founding of the Free Trade League in New York in 1919 under Putnam. The members of the Boston group carried on for a short time under the name International Free Trade League. They attempted to "combine free trade theory with single tax theory."

Putnam served as president of the Free Trade League during the 1920s but the work was "hampered by lack of funds and dwindling public support". After Putnam's death in 1930, Richard Rogers Bowker took over. In 1931 Bowker and Trumbull White, among other members, formed the Council for Tariff Reduction "which sought to achieve modest reductions in tariff levels by exerting pressure on Congress." The organizing committee distributed a printed statement to scholars, academicians, businessmen and others who were asked to endorse the statement and become members of the council, however, the council was unsuccessful. Ultimately, the effects of the Great Depression and the Smoot-Hawley Tariff of 1931, however, resulted in the defeat of the free trade movement and the League "appears to have ceased its functions in 1933."

=== Notable members ===
- David Ames Wells
- Mahlon Day Sands
- George Haven Putnam
- Richard Rogers Bowker
- William Wood
