= Mahlon Day Sands =

American merchant

Mahlon Day Sands (March 1, 1842 – May 7, 1888) was an American merchant.

== Early life ==
Sands was born on March 1, 1842, in New York City. He was a son of merchant Abraham B. Sands (1815–1861) and Sarah A. (née Day) Sands (1816–1906). His brothers were Philip Justice Sands and Henry Mankin Sands. His sister, Katherine Sands, was the wife of Edwin Lawrence Godkin.

His paternal grandfather was Nathaniel Sands, a cousin of Comfort Sands. His maternal grandfather, and namesake, was the children's book publisher, printer, and bookseller, Mahlon Day.

== Career ==
Sands was secretary of the American Free Trade League, who in 1870 advocated for civil service reform and free trade. He was partner of his deceased father's pharmaceutical importing firm, A.B. Sands and Company.

He was a member of the Union Club, the Knickerbocker Club, and the New York Yacht Club. In London, he was a member of the Marlborough Club and the Reform Club.

== Personal life ==
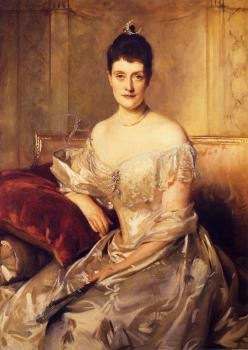
Portrait of his second wife, Mrs. Mahlon Day Sands (Mary Hartpence), by John Singer Sargent, 1893–1894.

In 1865, Sands married Edith Minturn (1841–1868), a daughter of merchant Robert Bowne Minturn and Anna Mary (née Wendell) Minturn (a daughter of Judge John Lansing Wendell). Her brother was Robert Bowne Minturn Jr. Together, they were the parents of:

- Mabel Sands (1866–1890), who married Clarence Granville Sinclair of Thurso Castle, son and heir apparent of Sir John Sinclair, 3rd Baronet; she died within days of the birth of her son; her widower died just five years later.

Edith died of typhus fever at sea on January 7, 1868, on her way to Calcutta. On September 18, 1872, Sands married Mary Morton Hartpence (1853–1896) in Newport, Rhode Island. Mary was a daughter of Alansan Hartpence and Martha (née Morton) Hartpence. Mary was also a niece of banker Levi P. Morton, who later served as Vice President of the United States under Benjamin Harrison. Her aunt, Mary Morton, was married to William F. Grinnell, and was the mother of her cousin, William Morton Grinnell, who served as the Third Assistant Secretary of State while Morton was vice president. Together, Mary and Mahlon were the parents of:

- Ethel Sands (1873–1962), an artist and hostess who lived in London and at Château d'Auppegard which she shared with her partner, Anna Hope Hudson.
- Mahlon Alanson Sands (1878–1936), who married Evelyn Nina Blight, a daughter of Atherton Blight.
- Morton Harcourt "Morty" Sands (1884–1959), a bachelor who was secretary to Lloyd George for several years before World War I; he bequeathed an important Chinese painting and 12 Japanese prints to the British Museum.

Sands died in London on May 7, 1888, after a horse fell while he was riding on Rotten Row and rolled onto him, fracturing his skull. His wife's uncle Levi, then the vice president-elect, was one of the executors of his will. His widow, a close friend of the Queen Alexandra, died in 1896 from heart disease at her residence in London on Portland Place. After a funeral at St George's, Hanover Square, her body was sent back to the United States just like her husband's had.

=== Descendants ===
Through his daughter Mabel, he was a grandfather of Archibald Sinclair (1890–1970), who inherited his paternal grandfather's baronetcy in 1912. The Leader of the Liberal Party, he was ennobled as Viscount Thurso in 1952.
