= SS Arctic disaster =

1854 ship sinking

Coordinates: 46°45′N 52°6′W

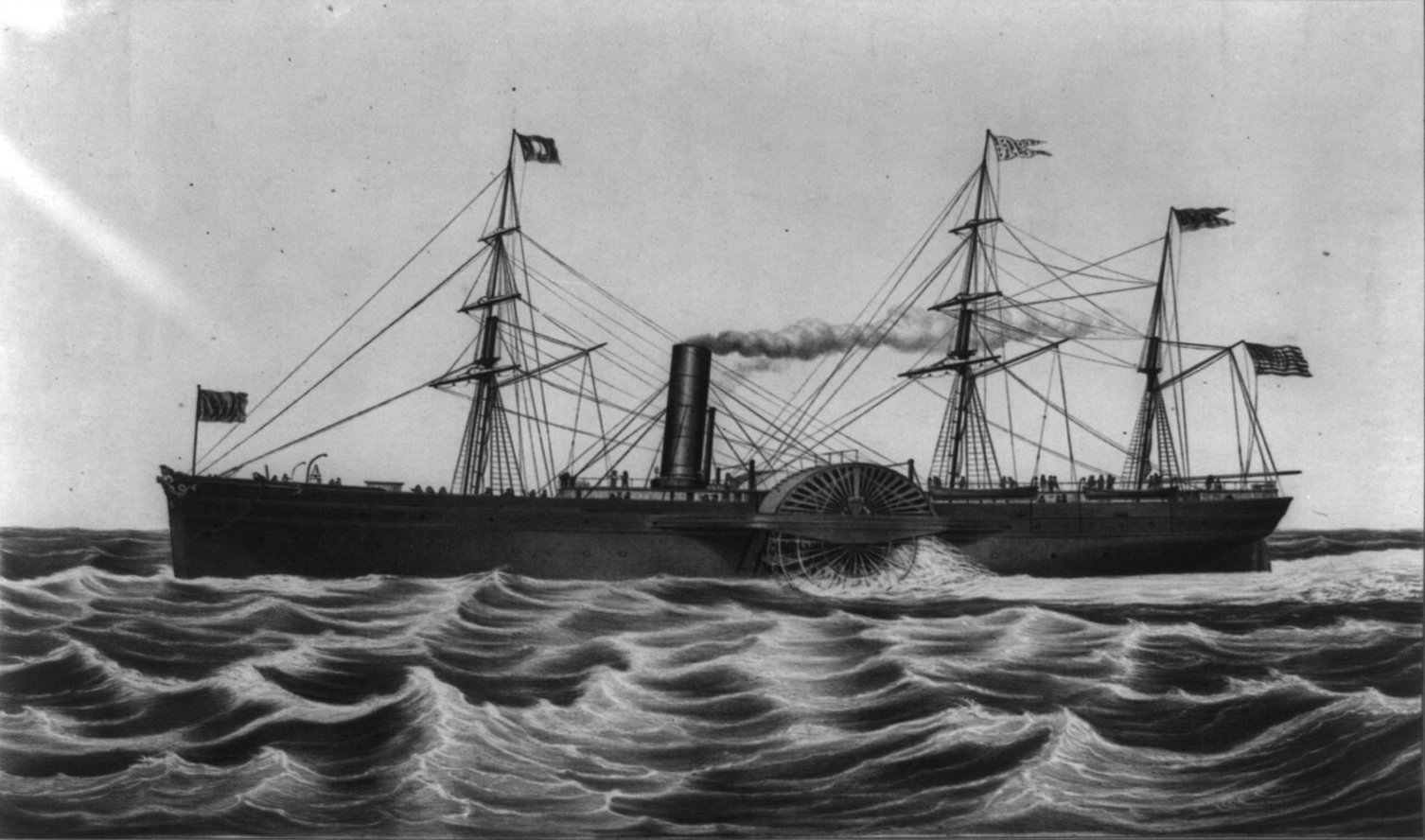
SS Arctic, after her launching in 1850

SS Arctic, an American paddle steamer owned by the Collins Line, sank on September 27, 1854, 50 miles (80 km) off the coast of Newfoundland after a collision with SS Vesta, a much smaller French vessel. Passenger and crew lists indicate that there were probably more than 400 on board; of these, only 88 survived, most of whom were members of the crew. All the women and children on board perished, along with the family of the owner of the Collins Line.

Arctic was the largest and most celebrated of the four Collins steamers that had operated a regular transatlantic passenger and mail carrying service since 1850. After the collision her captain, James Luce, first attempted to assist the stricken Vesta, which he believed was in imminent danger of sinking. When he discovered that his own ship had been seriously holed below the waterline, he decided to run her towards the nearest land in the hopes of reaching safety. His plan failed; the engines stopped when the ship was still a considerable distance from land. Arctic's lifeboat capacity was sufficient for fewer than half of those on board; when Luce ordered these launched, a breakdown in order and discipline meant that most places in the boats were taken by members of the crew or the more able-bodied male passengers. The rest struggled to build makeshift rafts, but most were unable to leave the ship and went down with her when she sank, four hours after the collision. Vesta, which initially appeared to have sustained mortal damage, was kept afloat by her watertight bulkheads and managed to limp into harbor at St. John's, Newfoundland.

Two of the six lifeboats that left Arctic reached the Newfoundland shore safely, and another was picked up by a passing steamer, which also rescued a few survivors from improvised rafts. Among those saved was Luce, who had regained the surface after initially going down with the ship. The other three lifeboats disappeared without trace. The limited telegraph facilities of the time meant that news of Arctic's loss did not reach New York City until two weeks after the sinking. Initial public sorrow at the ship's loss quickly turned to anger at the perceived cowardice of the crew. Despite press calls for a full investigation into the disaster, none took place, and nobody was held legally responsible. Demands for the introduction of further safety measures on passenger-carrying vessels were likewise sidestepped. Luce, who was generally exonerated from blame by the public, retired from the sea; some of the surviving crew chose not to return to the United States. The Collins Line continued its transatlantic service until further maritime losses and insolvency led to its closure in 1858.

== Background ==
=== Transatlantic shipping ===
In the second quarter of the 19th century, the transatlantic shipping trade was revolutionized by the development of long-range steamships. The transition from sail was gradual; shipowners were initially influenced by popular theories that ships could not carry sufficient coal to traverse the ocean. This notion was disproved in 1838 by the almost simultaneous crossings of Isambard Kingdom Brunel's giant paddle steamer SS Great Western and the American SS Sirius. Great Western completed the crossing, from Bristol to New York City, in fourteen days and twelve hours; under sail, westbound passages against the prevailing winds and current often took five weeks or more. (Note: Sirius left Queenstown in Ireland four days before Great Western left Bristol, and arrived in New York a few hours ahead of the British ship, thus becoming the first steamship to complete the crossing.)

The first shipping line to begin regular transatlantic steamer services was the British and North American Royal Mail Steam Packet Company, better known as the Cunard Line in recognition of its founder, the Canadian Samuel Cunard. It began its operations on July 4, 1840, when RMS Britannia left Liverpool for Boston, via Halifax, Nova Scotia. As the principal transatlantic mail carrier, the Cunard Line received subsidies from the British government and from the United States Post Office Department, the latter a point that rankled some Americans who felt that a home-owned line should be the beneficiary. U.S. Senator James A. Bayard of Delaware was among those urging Congress to subsidize a U.S. steamship line: "America will soon become tired of being informed of British maritime supremacy ... I suggest that Congress grant a carefully selected American shipping expert a completely free hand to proceed with the absolute conquest of this man Cunard". In 1845 the postmaster general invited tenders for a transatlantic mail contract. The successful bidder, announced on March 3, 1847, was New York shipowner Edward Knight Collins.

=== Collins Line ===
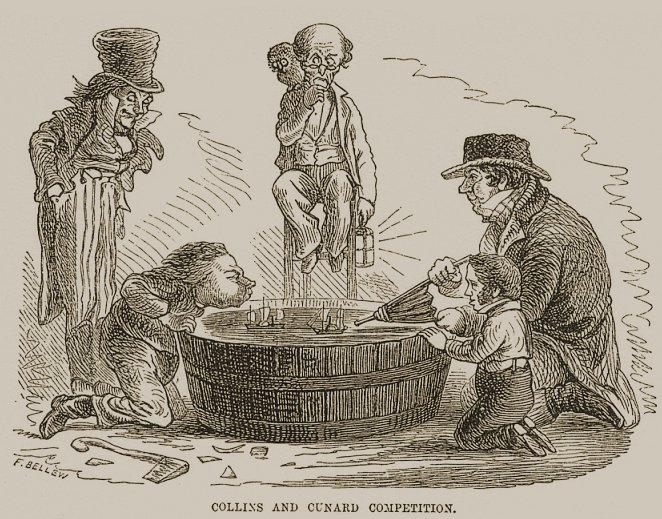
A cartoon from 1852, depicting the Collins–Cunard rivalry

With government subsidies promised, initially at $385,000 a year, (Note: The subsidy was increased to $858,000 in July 1852, when the Collins Line agreed to increase the number of annual crossings from 20 to 26. The line was dependent on these subsidies, since the voyages themselves were never profitable.) and with the backing of the leading investment bank Brown Brothers, Collins founded the New York and Liverpool United States' Mail Steamship Company, familiarly known as the Collins Line. He immediately embarked on an ambitious steamship construction program. The first of the four Collins Line ships, SS Atlantic, was launched in 1849 and began service in April 1850. Her three sister ships, Pacific, Arctic and Baltic, were all in service before the end of 1850. The four, all constructed of wood, were broadly similar in size and performance; Arctic was marginally the largest, at 284 feet (87 m) in length and 2,856 tons by American custom house measurement. (Note: At this time, the measurement of American ships' tonnage was a responsibility of the United States Custom House at Providence, Rhode Island. Some sources give a slightly different tonnage measurement for Arctic: for example Brown refers to "the 2,794-ton Arctic", without defining the method of measurement.) The new Collins Line steamers were about 25 percent larger than the biggest of the Cunard ships, and were soon outperforming them; crossings in ten days became routine.

Arctic entered service on October 26, 1850. The luxurious standards of its passenger accommodation contrasted with those experienced by Charles Dickens, who crossed the Atlantic Ocean in Cunard's Britannia in 1840. Dickens found his Britannia cabin dark and cramped, "a thoroughly hopeless, and profoundly preposterous box", while the bleak saloon was "a long narrow apartment, not unlike a gigantic hearse". In Arctic, according to a seasoned transatlantic passenger, her cabins "in comfort and elegance surpassed that of any merchant vessel Great Britain then possessed", while the main saloon had "an air of almost Oriental magnificence".

Under her captain, James Luce, a 49-year-old veteran of thirty years at sea, Arctic became the most celebrated of the Collins ships. Her record eastbound crossing, from New York to Liverpool in nine days, seventeen hours in the winter of 1851–52, earned her the title of the "Clipper of the Seas". Luce was admired by passengers as much for his social qualities as for his seamanship; a reporter for Harper's New Monthly Magazine wrote approvingly: "If you ever wish to cross the Atlantic, you will find in the Arctic one of the noblest of ships, and in Captain Luce one of the best of commanders".

== Last voyage ==
=== Liverpool to the Grand Banks ===
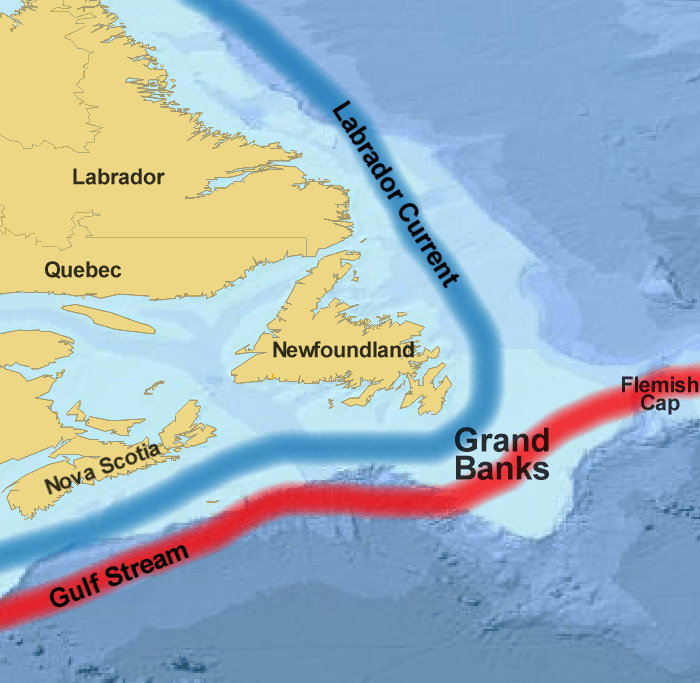
Map of the Grand Banks area, showing the contrasting Labrador and Gulf Stream currents

At about midday on September 20, 1854, Arctic left Liverpool for New York, carrying between 230 and 280 passengers (including around 100 women and children); about 150 crew members accompanied them. (Note: The exact number on board Arctic has not been established, nor how many of these were women and children. Alexander Brown (1962) provides tentative lists naming 282 passengers and 153 crew, while accepting that these may contain inaccuracies. From these names it appears that women and children accounted for at least 100 of the full complement, including two female crew, although gender is not specified in every case. On the other hand, David Shaw (2002) claims 233 passengers and 175 crew members, stating that all 200 berths in First Class were filled while 33 of the 80 berths in Second Class were taken.) Among the passengers was Mrs. Edward Collins, wife of the line's founder, who was traveling with her 19-year-old daughter Mary Ann and 15-year-old son Henry Coit, together with her brother and his wife. Another party was formed by members of the Brown banking family: William Benedict Brown, son of the bank's president, was accompanied by his wife Clara, their two infant children, and two of William's sisters, including Maria Miller "Millie" Brown, who was a friend of Captain Luce. A further passenger was Luce's partially disabled 11-year-old son, William Robert, whose health the captain thought might benefit from the round trip.

Arctic passed Cape Clear, at the southernmost point of Ireland, early on the morning of September 21, and entered the open Atlantic approaching her maximum speed of 13 knots (15 mph). In settled weather she progressed uneventfully, and early on September 27 had reached the Grand Banks, off the coast of Newfoundland. This area is formed by a series of relatively shallow submarine plateaus forming part of the Canadian continental shelf. Here, the sub-Arctic waters of the Labrador Current meet the warm northbound waters of the Gulf Stream to create weather systems typified by intermittent mists and fog. It was the practice for steamers to maintain maximum speeds in these conditions, although before electronic aids to navigation the risk of collision was considerable. Keeping schedules was considered paramount, particularly in the Collins Line where, Alexander Brown states in his 1962 account, "there was no room for overcautious shipmasters". On the morning of September 27, Luce observed typical Grand Banks conditions: "at intervals of a few minutes a very dense fog, followed by being sufficiently clear to see one or two miles."

=== Collision ===
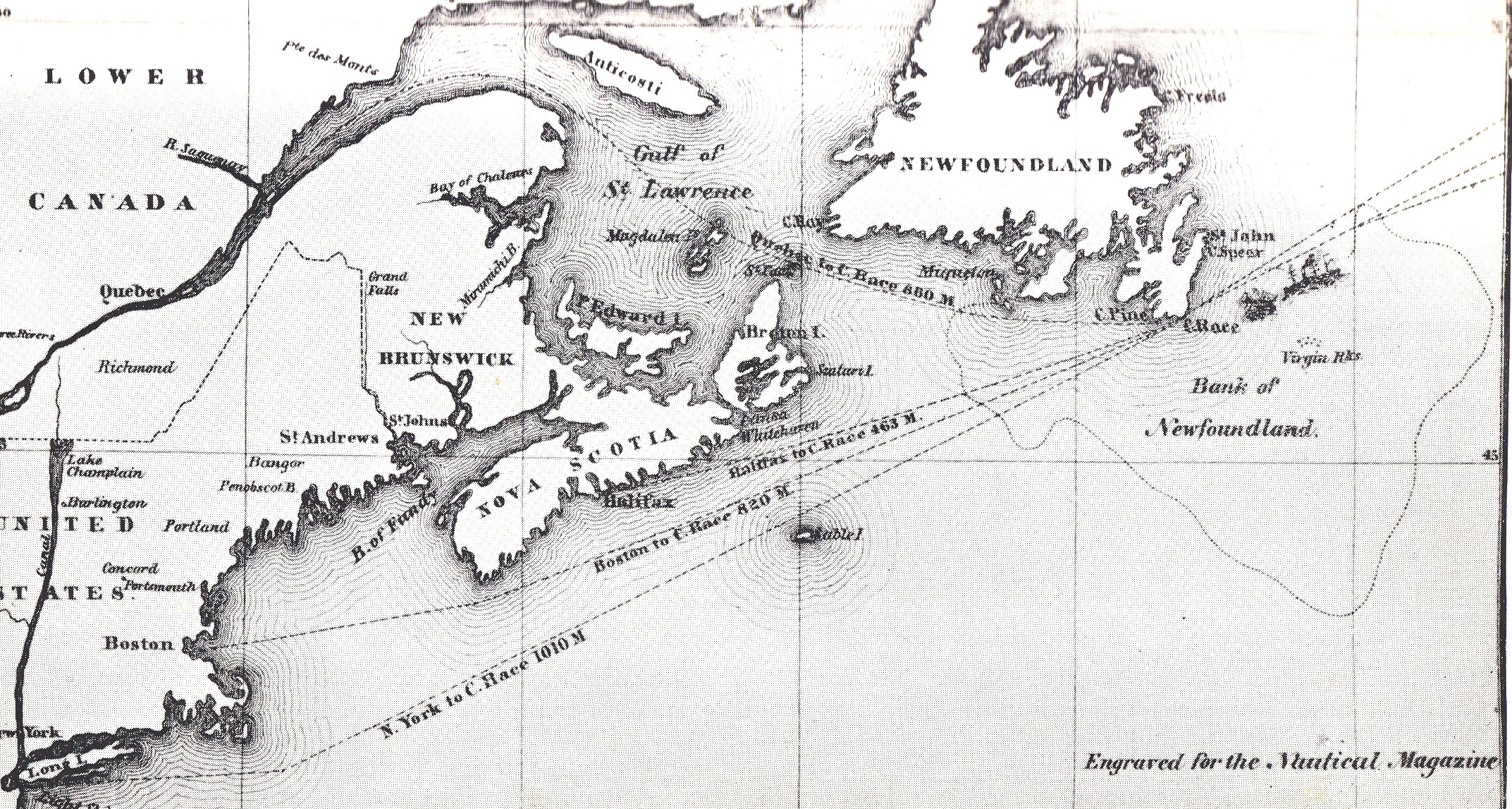
Map (1854) showing the position of the collision (upper right) between Arctic and Vesta, (roughly 46° 45'N, 52° 06'W) and the relative positions of land: Newfoundland, Halifax, Quebec, New York

At noon on September 27, Luce calculated the ship's position at roughly 50 miles (80 km) south-east of Cape Race in Newfoundland. Shortly afterwards, as Arctic slipped into a bank of fog, the lookout saw the shape of a steamer bearing down at a rate of around 10 knots. He gave the warning; the officer of the watch commanded, "Hard-a-starboard" and ordered the engine room to stop and reverse. In the chartroom, Luce heard these orders and returned to the deck, just as Arctic was struck by the advancing steamer on the starboard side, between the bow and the paddle wheel. His first impression was that his ship was "relatively uninjured".

To most of the passengers on board, the bump seemed slight. Many of the passengers were gathered in the cabin prior to lunch and some of them were engaged in drawing the numbers of the daily lottery, based on the number of miles run in the preceding 24 hours. In the saloon, passenger William Gihon "perceived a slight shock, although it was scarcely more than a tremor or a quiver". He continued his conversation with a fellow-passenger: "Neither of us entertained any idea at that time that the Arctic had sustained injury". As passenger James Smith would state "I think we all seemed to satisfy ourselves that the shock was so slight and we were on so large and strong a vessel, no serious damage had happended."

The steamer which had collided with Arctic was SS Vesta, captained by a 30 year old Alphonse Duchesne. Vesta was an iron-hulled propeller-driven French ship used by a major fishing operator to ferry its employees to and from their center of operations at Saint Pierre Island, a French territory off the coast of Newfoundland. To those on Arctic's deck, Vesta appeared to be fatally damaged; Luce thought her bows "seemed to be literally cut or crushed off for full ten feet". His first reaction, believing his own ship almost untouched, was to assist Vesta, on which scenes of panic and chaos among the 200-odd sailors and fishermen aboard her were evident. He ordered his chief officer, Robert Gourlay, to lower one of Arctic's six lifeboats with a crew of six and to ascertain what help could be offered; meanwhile, Arctic slowly circled the stricken vessel. Gourlay's boat was quickly away, and another was prepared for launching under second officer William Baalham, but before this could be done Luce rescinded the order. He had noticed that Arctic had begun to list to starboard and settle by the bow, as well as a change in the movement of her paddle wheels through the water, signs of potentially serious damage. Baalham was ordered to make a closer inspection of the point of impact; he found that debris from Vesta's iron stem and anchor were impaled in the woodwork of Arctic's hull, creating substantial holes about eighteen inches above the water-line. Two breaches were below the waterline, admitting large quantities of water. Unlike Vesta, Arctic was not equipped with watertight compartments; the hull was open from stem to stern.

=== Confusion and panic ===
==== Dash for land ====
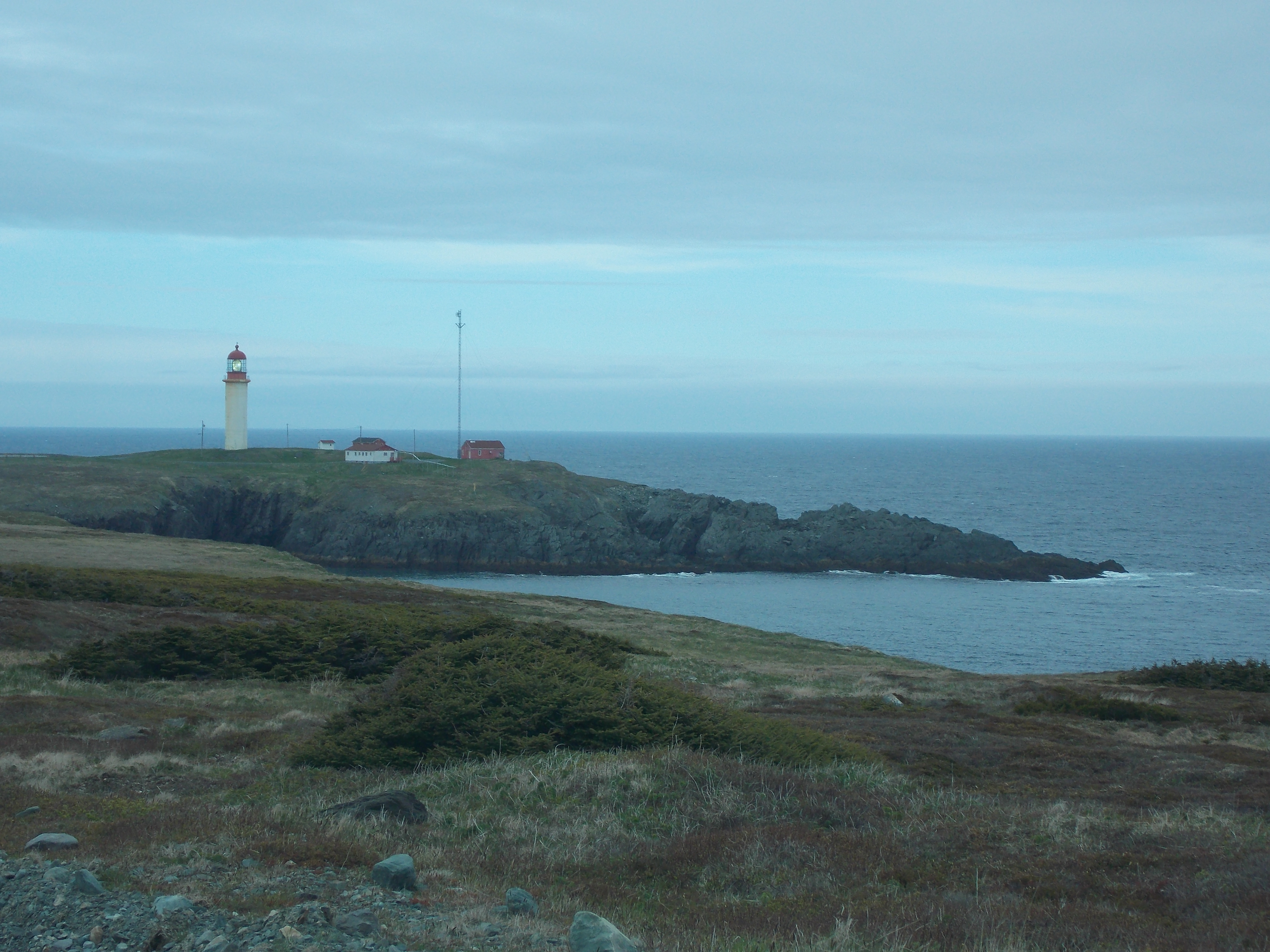
Cape Race, Newfoundland, the land nearest to the point of collision

As Baalham made his inspection, others observed the extent of the damage, and a mood of concern and anxiety began to develop as news spread. With Arctic's four pumps working at full capacity, Luce attempted to stanch the leak by passing a large canvas sail over the ship's bow. This, he hoped, could be fastened over the holes in the hull to lessen the inflow of water, but the jagged iron debris protruding from the hull quickly tore the sail apart. The ship's carpenter tried to stuff the breaches with mattresses and other materials, but the holes were by then too far below the waterline to be reached. Realizing that his ship was in serious danger of sinking, Luce decided to run for the nearest land in the hopes of reaching safety while Arctic was still afloat; Cape Race was about four hours distant, if the ship could be kept moving. This decision meant abandoning Vesta, but Luce rationalized that the French vessel was likely to sink at any moment and that remaining with her might well condemn his own passengers and crew to the same fate. After vainly attempting to signal his intention to Gourlay and his crew, who were being left to fend for themselves, Luce ordered full speed ahead. A few minutes later, Arctic ploughed into a lifeboat that had been launched from Vesta. All but one of its dozen occupants were killed, mostly crushed under Arctic's paddle wheels. The single survivor was a fisherman, Jassonet François, who jumped clear and was hauled aboard Arctic by a rope.

==== Boats launched ====
As the water in Arctic's hull continued to rise, outstripping the pumps, the boiler fires were gradually extinguished. By one o'clock the ship was scarcely moving. Still far from land, and with no help nearby, Luce ordered that the ship's lifeboats be prepared for launching. In accordance with the governing maritime regulations, Arctic carried six steel-constructed boats, one of which had departed with Gourlay. The five remaining boats could safely hold 150 persons, well under half of those on board but with more than enough places to hold all the women and children. (Note: The six boats were officially labeled: port guard; starboard guard; port quarter; starboard quarter; forward deck; after deck.) Under the charge of the ship's quartermaster, women and children were placed in the port guard boat, but as this orderly process proceeded, a group of male passengers and crew members rushed forward to claim the remaining places, and the boat was filled. Although ordered by the captain to remain alongside, it was rowed rapidly away.

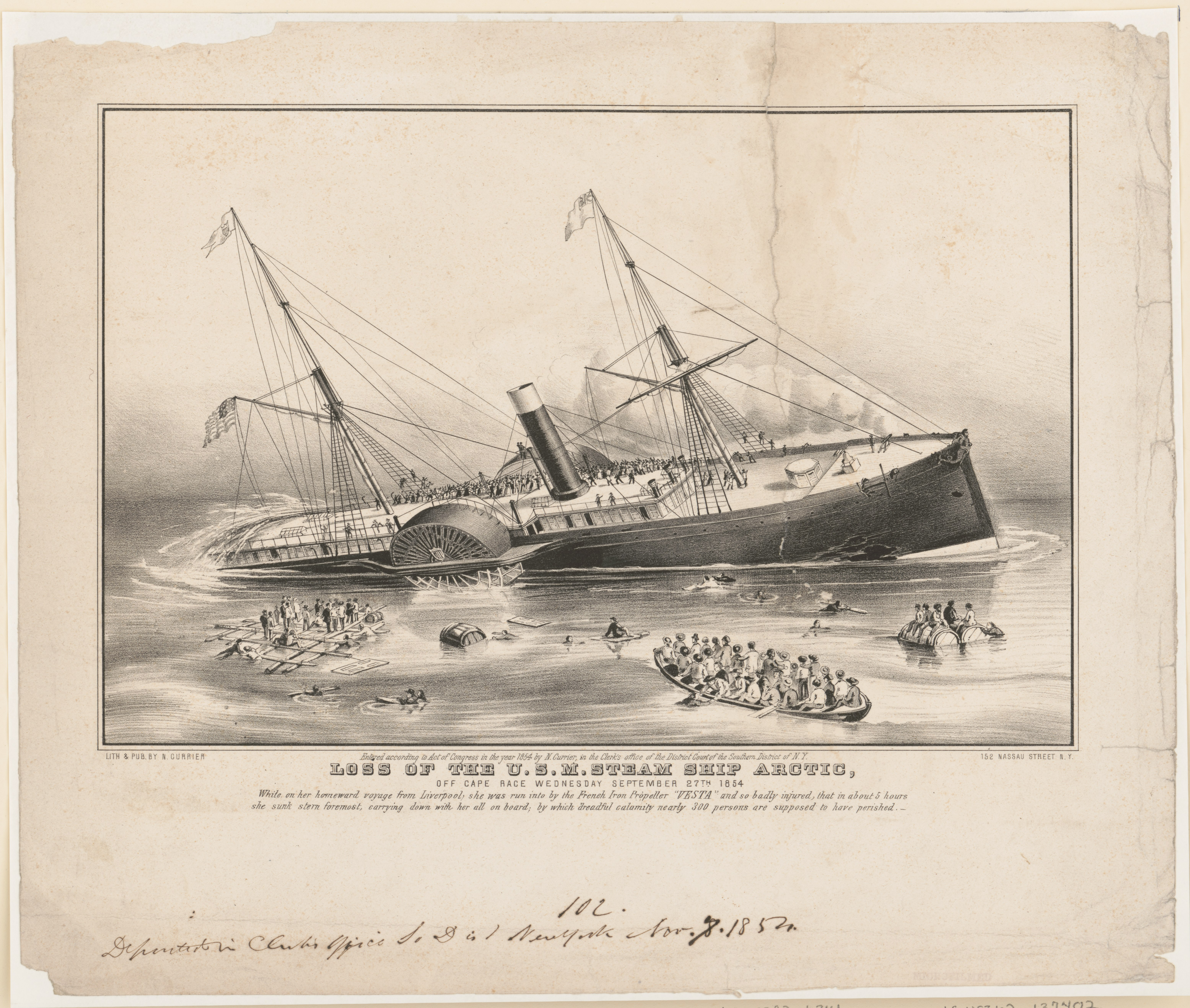
A view of the SS Arctic sinking

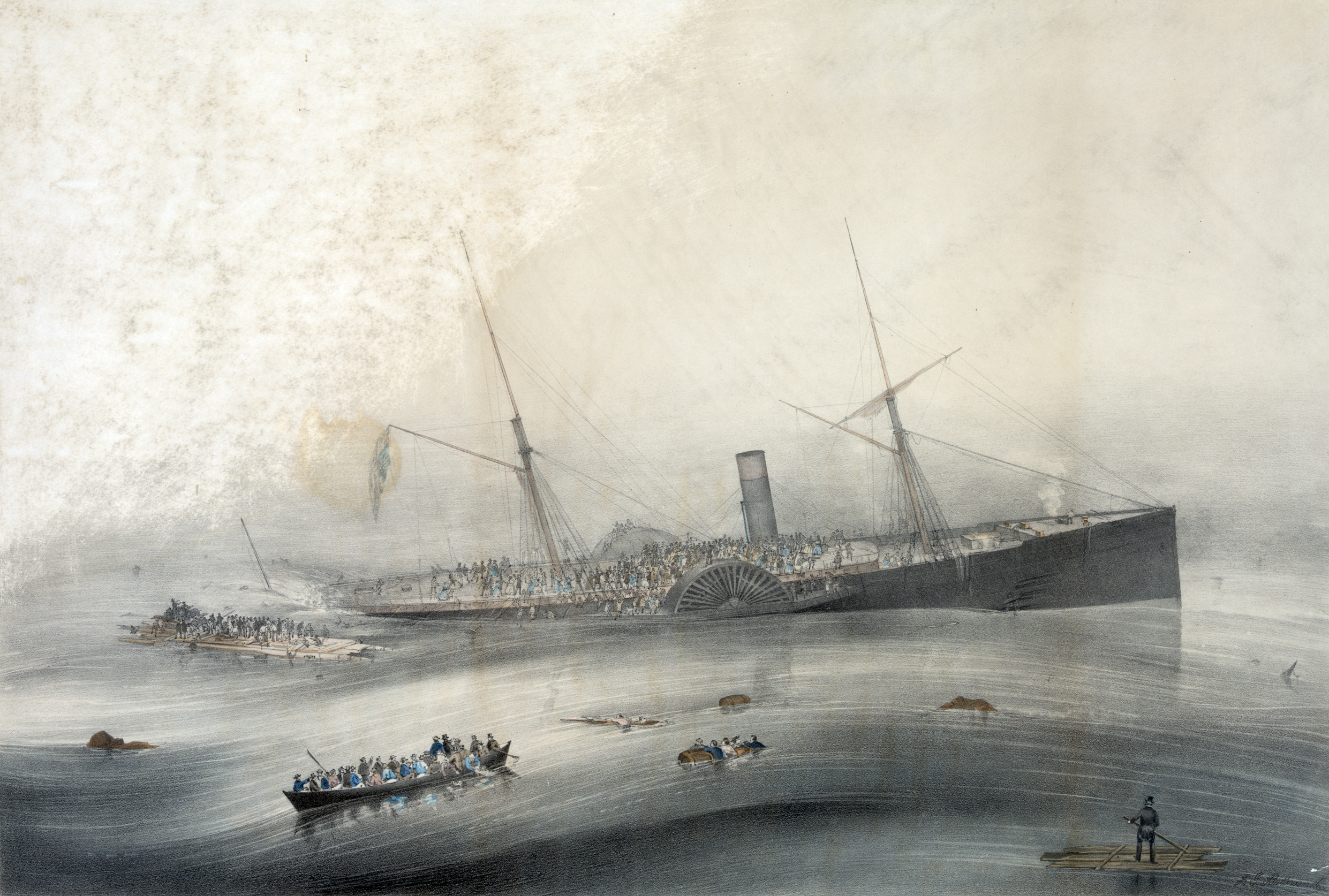
A depiction of the scene shortly before Arctic's sinking, showing the makeshift raft, several smaller improvised rafts, and an escaping lifeboat

On board Arctic, disquiet turned increasingly into panic as it became clear that lifeboat capacity was inadequate. Shortly after the port guard boat's departure, the port quarter boat, with around twelve women and five crew aboard, was being readied for lowering into the water when it, too, was rushed by members of the crew. In the general melee the boat was upended, sending all but three of its occupants into the water, where they drowned. On the other side of the ship, Luce ordered Baalham to launch the starboard guard boat and proceed with it to the stern, where women and children passengers would be passed down. No sooner was it launched when it was overwhelmed by men, who leapt into the water and clambered into the boat; all but one of these were crew members. With his boat now full, Baalham disregarded Luce's instructions to pick up women and children, and drifted away. Meanwhile, the upended port quarter boat had been righted, but despite Luce's efforts to give women passengers priority, it was again rushed by crew and male passengers, who thrust aside the waiting women and cut the boat adrift from the ship while it was only partially filled.

While Luce's attention was fully occupied in vain attempts to impose order, a group of the ship's engineers, led by Chief Engineer J. W. Rogers, quietly appropriated one of the two remaining lifeboats. They maintained they required the boat for a final attempt at plugging the leaks; anyone who questioned their intentions, or attempted to board the boat, was threatened with firearms. With ample food and water, this boat left the ship half full, occupied entirely by engine room staff. Of the ship's officers only Luce and fourth officer Francis Dorian now remained; virtually all the engineers and seamen had left. Around 300 people were still on board, with a single lifeboat. As a final measure to give at least some of them a chance of survival, Luce ordered the building of a raft. The fore and main yardarms, with various beams, spars and other wooden artifacts, were collected and lowered into the sea where Dorian, in the remaining boat, attempted to supervise the raft's construction.

While some men worked to put together a raft, others abandoned hope. They drank all the hard liquor at the bar, then smashed the storage closet to obtain more. Some passed out drunk, and some began sexually assaulting female passengers. When the ship suddenly settled downward, a group of men rushed at Luce, attempting to get on the raft, still under construction. They successfully rushed and pushed aside Luce, and landed en masse on the raft. Despite Dorian's entreaties, his raft was rapidly overwhelmed; to save it he cut loose, leaving a final terrified scramble for whatever security the half-finished raft could provide. Among those who found safety in Dorian's boat was a fireman, Patrick Tobin. According to his later account: "It was every man for himself. No more attention was paid to the captain than to any other man on board. Life was as sweet to us as to others".

=== Sinking ===
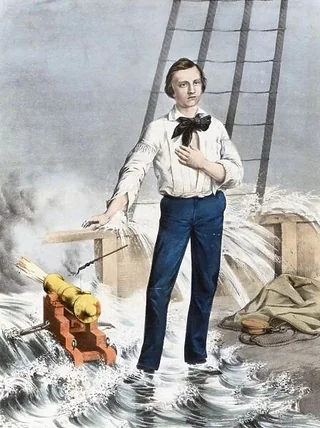
The Last Gun of the Arctic Stewart Holland at the Signal Gun (Portrait of Holland from a daguerreotype lent by his father)

With Arctic rapidly sinking and all of the lifeboats gone, Luce instructed a young trainee engineer, Stewart Holland of Washington, D.C., to station himself at the bow and to fire the ship's signal cannon at one-minute intervals, in the hope of attracting the attention of a passing vessel. Throughout the chaos of the ship's final minutes, Holland held his position and continued to fire until the moment the ship sank. Holland did not survive the sinking. His last words, allegedly said to Captain Luce, were: "Let it be known that one crewman aboard this ship did not abandon his post." Holland's bravery and devotion to duty were noted in several later accounts: the Baltimore Sun called him "a conqueror of death. That noble ship had many noble spirits on board—but none nobler than he".

Also remaining at her post was Black stewardess Anna Downer, who continued to work a hand pump until her hands bled from the efforts, even after many others among the crew had abandoned ship. Captain Luce stated he encountered Downer below decks about half an hour before the ship sank and had bid her to come up with him, to which she replied: "Captain, I'm willing to pump as long as I can work my arms." After the ship completely sank, men in Dorian's boat reported seeing the dead body of the "colored stewardess" in the water.

Luce refused to take any action to save himself—he had told Baalham, before the second officer's departure, that "the fate of the ship shall be mine". When he could no longer render assistance to those still on board, he climbed with his young son to his command post atop the starboard paddle box and waited for the end. By this time, many on board had become resigned to their fate; they huddled together for comfort while some sang hymns or recited scripture. A few still frantically sought for means of survival; those who could not find a place on the raft lashed together anything that might float—chairs, stools, caskets, sofas and doors—while Holland continued to fire the cannon. Peter McCabe, a waiter on his first transatlantic voyage, later described the scene: "Several persons were floating about on doors and beds ... I seized hold of a door which had been taken down to save passengers, and went into the sea, where I left the door and got upon the raft ... A great many persons were trying to get on the raft ... Among the number who were on it I saw four ladies". Many were lost from the raft when it fouled the sinking hull—a section broke off, spilling its occupants into the sea. After this, McCabe counted 72 men and 4 women either on or clinging to the structure as it moved slowly away from the ship.

At around 4:45 pm, four and a half hours after the collision, Holland fired the cannon for the final time as Arctic sank stern-first. There were still perhaps 250 persons on board. As the ship went down, Paul Grann from New York, in Dorian's boat, heard "one fearful shriek, and saw the passengers swept forward against the smokestack, and then all was over". Luce, holding tightly to his child, was dragged deep down by the suction of the sinking vessel. When he rose to the surface, "a most awful and heart-rending scene presented itself to my view—over two hundred men, women and children struggling together amidst pieces of wreck of every kind, calling on each other for help, and imploring God to assist them. Such an appalling scene may God preserve me from ever witnessing again." As he struggled, a section of one of Arctic's paddle-boxes rose to the surface, delivering him a glancing blow but striking and killing his son outright. Despite the shock, Luce was able to clamber on to the paddle-box, which provided a temporary raft for him and eleven others.

== Survival and rescue ==
=== Newfoundland ===
A short distance from the foundering ship, Baalham's boat encountered the partly filled port quarter boat. The loads were equalized, and the two vessels, with 45 persons in all, agreed to proceed under Baalham's overall command. After briefly considering—and rejecting—a suggestion that they should look for other survivors, the two unprovisioned boats began rowing in the direction of the Newfoundland coast. Without an adequate compass, Baalham navigated by the run of the sea and occasional glimpses of the stars. Many of these survivors were freezing through extensive immersion in the cold water, about 45 °F (7 °C); nevertheless, they rowed through the night and the next day. Twice they sighted ships in the distance, but were not seen. Early on the morning of September 29 they were close to the shoreline of Newfoundland's Avalon Peninsula, and shortly afterwards the two boats landed at Broad Cove, about 50 miles (80 km) south of St John's.

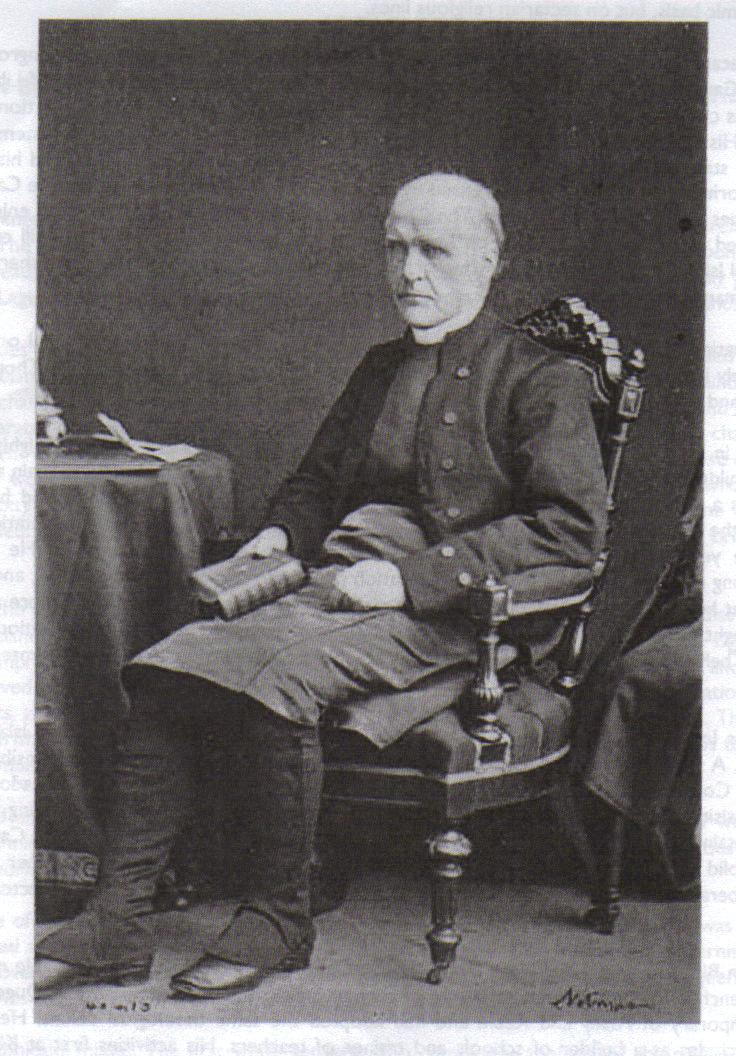
Bishop Edward Feild, whose yacht Hawk helped to search for Arctic survivors

After a brief respite, the party moved on to Renews, a fishing village four miles (six km) to the north. There, Arctic's purser, John Geib, wrote a short message for dispatch by courier to the American consul in St John's, informing him of the collision. Baalham hired two schooners; in one, he returned with two others to the location of the sinking to search for other survivors. In the other, the rest of the group sailed for St John's. When they arrived, during the afternoon of October 2, they were surprised to find Vesta, safely moored in the harbor. Despite the serious damage to its bow, her watertight bulkheads had held firm, enabling the ship to proceed slowly to St John's with almost her complete complement on board. Her arrival, on September 30, had provided the basis of the first, inaccurate report of the disaster in the local Patriot and Terra Nova Herald newspaper, in which it was assumed that Arctic had survived. The Arctic survivors' reception in St John's was cool, as following Vesta's arrival the perception had been that Arctic had displayed what William Flayhart, in his account of the disaster, terms a "hit and run" attitude.

Baalham arrived on October 3, following a fruitless three-day search for survivors. The text of Geib's brief letter to the American consul appeared in that day's edition of the St John's Newfoundlander, while its rival newspaper The Public Ledger printed a more detailed account of the disaster provided by Baalham. Because St John's lacked a telegraph service, these reports had to be taken by the steamer Merlin to Halifax, where they could be wired to New York. Most of the Arctic party traveled on the same steamer; Geib remained in St John's, on the chance that further survivors might arrive. Merlin detoured to cover the area of the sinking but discovered nothing; she then proceeded to Sydney, Nova Scotia, and reached Halifax on October 11.

Numerous efforts were launched from St John's in the hope of finding more survivors. An English schooner, John Clements, spent a week searching, before returning with Arctic's flagstaff but no personnel. The New York, Newfoundland and London Telegraph Company, owners of the steamer Victoria, offered their vessel to the American consul for a fee of $500 a day, an action which led to considerable criticism from the local press. By contrast, the Bishop of Newfoundland, the Right Revd Edward Feild, provided his private yacht Hawk free of charge. Eventually Victoria agreed to assist without payment, although an unnamed correspondent of the Ledger doubted whether the ship made more than a perfunctory search. None of the ships other than John Clements found any definite traces of Arctic. Some reported that they had sighted debris, but were not able to identify or recover it.

=== Huron, Lebanon, and Cambria ===
The whole time I had been in the water I had not eaten a particle of anything or drank a drop ... my sight had become so dim that I could not perceive objects a few feet off, even the ghastly faces of the dead that looked up at me from under the raft ...

— Survivor Peter McCabe recounts his two days adrift on a raft to The New York Times.

Dorian's lifeboat was the smallest of the ship's boats and, with 26 crew and 5 passengers on board, had only a few inches of freeboard. In worsening weather, Dorian improvised a rough sea anchor, which enabled the boat to ride the waves through the night and following day without being swamped. In the late afternoon of September 28 they sighted a distant sail, which proved to be the Canadian barque Huron, bound for the Province of Canada. As they rowed towards their rescuer, they passed Peter McCabe, still clinging to the makeshift raft, the only one of its 72 occupants to have survived the night; he, too was taken on board Huron. McCabe later recalled that he thought he was within ten minutes of death when he was rescued.

On the following day Huron encountered another sailing ship, the Lebanon, heading for New York. Dorian, the five passengers and twelve of the crew chose to transfer to Lebanon. The other crewmen, possibly anticipating a hostile reception in their home port, chose to remain with Huron and proceed to the Province of Canada, where she arrived on October 13.

The ordeal of Captain Luce, and others who survived on assorted wreckage, lasted for two days. Around noon on September 29, the sailing ship Cambria, out of Glasgow and heading for the Province of Canada, spotted Jassonet François, the Vesta fisherman who had been rescued by the Arctic after the collision. In the following few hours, Cambria picked up nine more survivors; these included Luce and two companions, the only survivors of the eleven who had found refuge on the remains of the paddle-box. The last to be picked up by Cambria was James Smith, a businessman from Scotland, who had survived on a raft constructed from planking and a tin-lined wicker basket. He had seen at least one ship pass in the distance during his ordeal, and had almost given up hope when Cambria arrived. Once satisfied there were no further survivors in the area, Cambria continued its journey to the Province of Canada. Luce spent much of the voyage preparing a report of the disaster, ready to wire to Edward Collins in New York as soon as he reached land. Cambria arrived in the Province of Canada on October 13, a few hours after Huron.

The fates of three of Arctic's lifeboats are unknown: the starboard quarter boat in which Gourlay left to assist Vesta just after the collision; the port guard boat, launched under the control of the quartermaster; and the forward deck boat, appropriated by Rogers and his associates. No trace of the occupants of these boats was ever found. In mid-November 1854, Gourlay's empty boat was picked up by the schooner Lily Dale, in good condition and with its oars still inside. In mid-December the port guard boat was washed ashore at Placentia Bay in Newfoundland, again with no indication of the fate of its occupants.

== New York ==
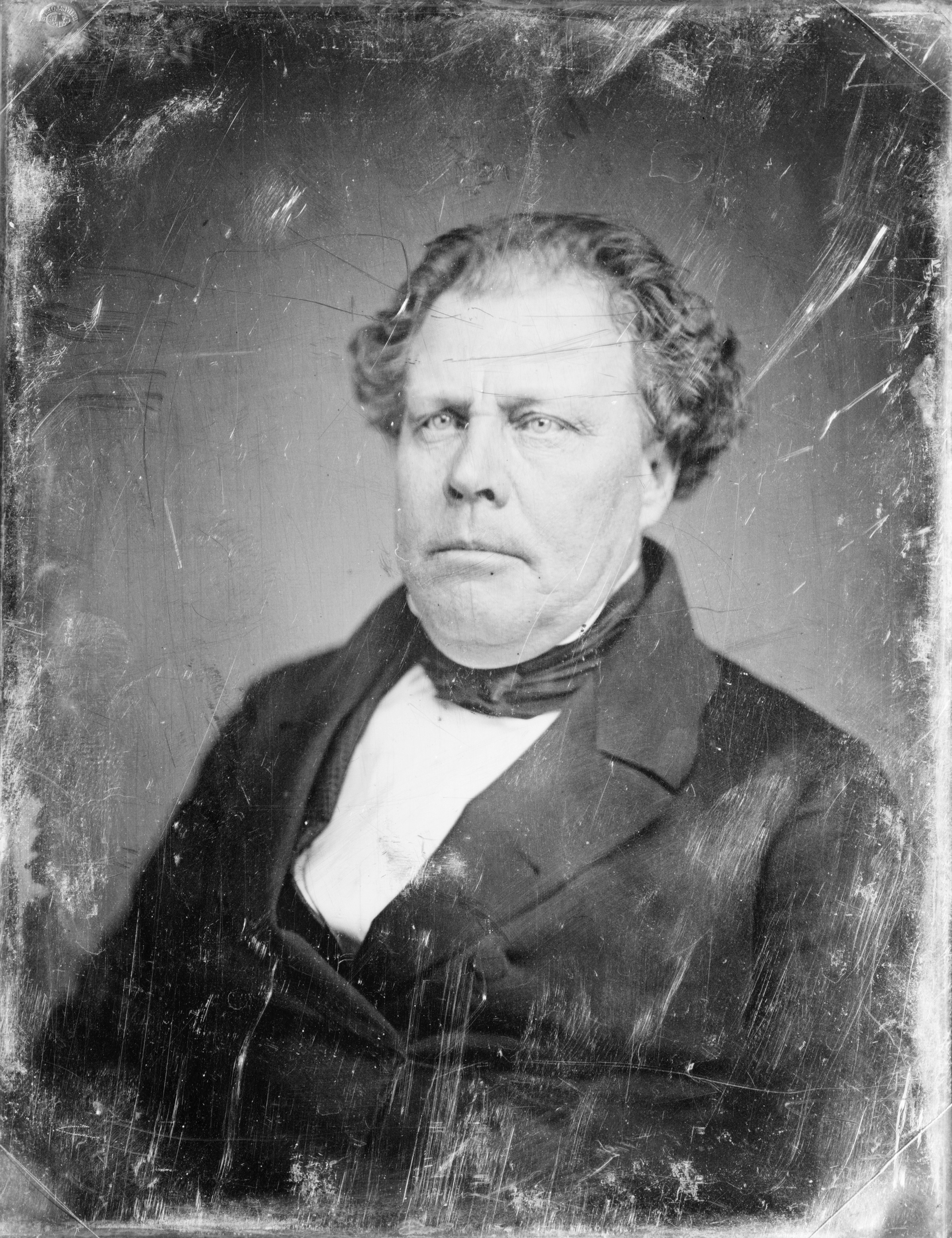
Edward Knight Collins, founder of the Collins Line, whose wife and two children were drowned in the disaster

New York first heard of the disaster on October 11, with the arrival of the survivors rescued by Lebanon. Later that day, Baalham's report, telegraphed from Halifax, was received at the Collins offices. The men from Lebanon were seized upon by the press; their stories, and the details from Baalham's wired account, formed the basis of the early newspaper accounts. At that stage, information was incomplete; Luce was missing and presumed lost, and there were various speculations about the numbers of casualties. The New York Herald's headline announced: "Between Three and Four Hundred Souls Perished", and: "Only Thirty-two Lives Known to be Saved". On the basis of the sketchy telegraphs from Halifax, the Baltimore Sun printed the false story that Vesta had saved 31 from Arctic's complement and brought them into St John's. This confusion temporarily raised hopes that the number saved might be higher than was immediately apparent, but this hope was dashed when, on the following day, some of Baalham's party from St John's arrived in New York, via Halifax and Boston, with their more detailed accounts.

On October 13, Luce's telegraphed report was received at the Collins New York office. The news of his survival was the cause of celebration and thanksgiving. In his first paragraph, Luce informed Edward Collins that the lost passengers likely "included your wife, daughter and son, with whom I took a last leave the moment the ship was going down". That day, the Sun reported the loss of the entire Brown party. Luce's account of the rushing of lifeboats, and the early departures of officers and crew, caused considerable consternation in New York, which quickly turned to anger and condemnation as it became apparent that no women or children had been saved, and that most of the survivors were from the crew. The New York Times reported "an entire lack of disciplined control over the whole of the ship", and that "the officers and crew did not do their best towards saving the vessel, which they left too early". Paul Grann, from Dorian's boat, reported that "all order and discipline ceased on board", and that Rogers had threatened passengers with firearms. Later press accounts condemned the crew in increasingly harsh terms; the Times referred to "a ghastly desertion of duty" and condemned the "cowardly and dastardly conduct of the crew". Scientific American adjudged that the behavior of the crew in saving themselves before their passengers had "blackened the character of our marine in the eyes of the whole world". (Note: Although much anger, at the time and retrospectively, was directed to the self-preserving actions of the crew, a 2013 research project carried out at the University of Uppsala, Sweden, indicated that the Arctic crew's behavior was relatively common in shipwrecks. After examining the survival data of 15 maritime disasters between 1852 and 2011, the group concluded that (a) women have a distinct survival disadvantage, (b) crew survival rates are significantly higher than those for passengers, and (c) human behavior in such situations is accurately encapsulated by the expression "every man for himself".) Luce, however, was largely exculpated; he had not sought to save himself, had gone down with his ship, and had survived largely by chance. When he arrived in New York by train on October 14, he was greeted as a hero.

The probable number of survivors from Arctic is 88, of whom 24 (including the French fisherman Jassonet François) were passengers. This figure includes 45 in Baalham's Newfoundland party, 32 rescued by Huron, 10 picked up by Cambria, and a passenger, Thomas Fleury, whose survival was not known until 1860. (Note: Fleury's story was that he had been rescued by a whaler, which had sunk during the course of a lengthy cruise; he had found refuge on a remote island, where he had eventually been picked up by a second whaler, which he maintained had only just returned to New York. His wife had remarried meantime.) Alexander Brown names 85 survivors, but includes only 42 from Baalham's party. David Shaw, writing in 2002, gives the total who survived as 87, but does not count Fleury. In the absence of accurate passenger and crew lists, it has not been possible to establish the precise number of casualties; on the basis of published partial lists, Flayhart estimates the death toll as not less than 285, and conceivably as high as 372. Some accounts give inflated casualty figures; for example, W.H. Rideing in 1896 asserts that "five hundred and sixty-two persons perished".

== Aftermath ==
After a week of reports chiefly concerned with survival accounts and tributes, on October 18 The New York Times turned to "Lessons Concerning Means of Security on Ocean Steamers". Among several recommendations were: the compulsory use of steam whistles or trumpets as fog signals; the construction of permanent watertight bulkheads in all passenger-carrying ships; organized lifeboat drills for passengers; better discipline and more training among seamen. (Note: The writer was very critical of the treatment of seamen in American ships, who he believed "are so treated that it is impossible for them to retain self-respect and decent, orderly, gentlemanly habits of mind ... I do not believe there is one native seaman in a hundred who is not a helpless drunkard when on shore ... And all this is even more true of the foreigners who have long been in our service".) Few of these suggested reforms were adopted immediately; calls for steamships sailing under the U.S. flag to carry sufficient lifeboats for everyone on board were resisted until after the loss of RMS Titanic 58 years later. In December 1854, the same newspaper called for an official enquiry into the disaster: "Whatever may be the extent of their legal responsibility, the owners, the officers and the crew of the Arctic are responsible to the public judgment ... They have no right to resist any attempt that may be made to define the extent of that responsibility, nor to deprecate any degree of scrutiny into their conduct". No such investigation was ever instituted, and no one was taken to court for their actions. Some of the crewmen who landed in the Province of Canada avoided questions by not returning to the U.S.; according to Shaw they "disappeared on the waterfronts along the St Lawrence River and found the obscurity they wanted".

Luce never went to sea again. The sympathy that greeted him on his return to New York did not prevent later criticism that he had not acted forcefully enough and had, according to the crewman Tobin, "seemed like a man whose judgment was paralyzed". He accepted that his abandonment of Gourlay had been a grave error; the first officer might well have supervised a more disciplined organization of the lifeboats. Luce took a post as an inspector of ships with the Great Western Marine Insurance Company, where he worked until his death in 1879, in his 75th year. His obituarist recorded that "his latter years were embittered by the recollection of the terrible disaster". The Collins Line continued its fortnightly transatlantic mail steamship service with its three remaining ships, but suffered a further blow when, in January 1856, SS Pacific sank with her entire complement of 186 passengers and crew. Nevertheless Collins went ahead with the construction of an even larger ship, the SS Adriatic, which, after a single round trip in November–December 1857, was laid up. Confidence in the line had been damaged; "people concluded that getting there was more important than luxuriating amid ornate trim", and public opinion was increasingly averse to the payment of government subsidies to finance the Collins Line's extravagances. Early in 1858, when these subsidies were heavily cut back, the line ceased business, and the Cunard ships resumed their position of transatlantic supremacy. Vesta, fully repaired, remained in the service of various owners until 1875 when, renamed Amberes, she is recorded as sinking in Santander harbor.

Among memorials to those lost from Arctic, a stone pillar was erected next to Luce's grave in the Center cemetery at Wareham, Massachusetts, to honor 11-year-old Willie Luce, who had died at his father's side as the ship sank. James Brown of Brown Brothers bank built an elaborate monument in Green-Wood Cemetery, Brooklyn, to commemorate the six members of his family who had drowned. It incorporates a sculpture of Arctic at the moment of her sinking.

== See also ==
- Women and children first
- PS Lady Elgin, collision between a steamship and a sailing ship
- Sinking of the SS La Bourgogne, a result of the collision between a steamship and a sailing ship

== Notes and references ==
=== Sources ===
- Brown, Alexander Crosby (1962). Women and Children Last. London: Frederick Muller. OCLC 753009727.
- Dickens, Charles (1913). American Notes for General Circulation. London: Chapman and Hall. OCLC 832156813.
- Flayhart, William H. (2003). Perils of the Atlantic: Steamship Disasters, 1850 to the Present. New York: W.W. Norton. ISBN 0-393-04155-7.
- Gibbon, John Townsend (1990). Palaces that Went to Sea. Minneapolis: Nerus Publishing. ISBN 0-9625082-0-9.
- Gould, John H. (1891). "Ocean Passenger Travel". In Chadwick, F.E. (ed.). Ocean Steamships. New York: Scribners. pp. 114–148. OCLC 3688125. (Also available as a 2012 print on demand book. ISBN 9783861959663.)
- Kingston, W.H.G. (1873) Shipwrecks and Disasters at Sea. George Routledge and Sons, London.
- Shaw, David W. (2002). The Sea Shall Embrace Them. New York: The Free Press. ISBN 0-7432-2217-2.
