= David Ames Wells =

American engineer & economist (1828–1898)

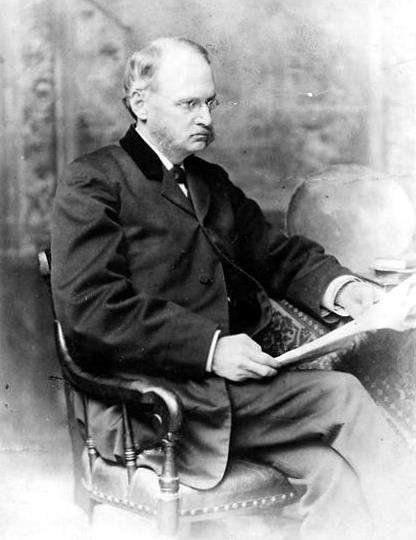
- Wells in 1886
- Born: June 17, 1828; Springfield, Massachusetts, U.S.
- Died: November 6, 1898 (aged 70); Norwich, Connecticut, U.S.

Academic background
- Education: Lawrence Scientific School; Williams College

David Ames Wells (June 17, 1828 – November 5, 1898) was an American engineer, textbook author, economist and advocate of low tariffs.

Born in Springfield, Massachusetts, he graduated from Williams College in 1847. In 1848 he joined the staff of the Springfield Republican newspaper, where he invented a device to fold papers. He graduated from the Lawrence Scientific School at Cambridge, Massachusetts in 1851, where he worked with Louis Agassiz. Also in 1851, he was appointed assistant professor at the Lawrence Scientific School, and was lecturer on chemistry and physics at Groton Academy. He edited The Annual of Scientific Discovery from 1850 to 1866. He invented devices for textile mills, and wrote The Science of Common Things (1857) and Wells's Principles and Applications of Chemistry (1858); Wells's First Principles of Geology (1861) and Wells's Natural Philosophy (1863), which went through fifteen editions as a college textbook.

He was a strong supporter of Abraham Lincoln during the American Civil War, writing pamphlets that reassured investors of the soundness of Lincoln's financial policies. He first attained reputation as a political economist by an address on “Our Burden and Our Strength,” read before a literary society of Troy in 1864. It discussed the resources of the United States in regard to the nation's debt-paying ability, and attracted the attention of President Lincoln, who appointed him in 1865 chairman of a three-member National Revenue Commission. In this capacity Wells was the first to collect economic and financial statistics for government use. The commission's recommendations became law in 1866.

President Andrew Johnson made him a special commissioner of the revenue. The Reports of the Special Commissioner of the Revenue, 1866-69 recommended the use of stamps in the collection of revenue on liquor and tobacco. Wells was instrumental in abolishing the many petty taxes which had been imposed during the Civil War, and originated most of the important forms and methods of internal revenue taxation adopted from 1866 to 1870.

In 1867, Wells studied the costs of production in Europe. He started as a high-tariff supporter, but finding that high wages in America made for efficiency as compared with the backward methods of competing countries, he was converted to free trade, and became a leading advocate of abolition of the tariff. He was an advisor to his close friend, Congressman James Garfield, on tariff matters, and later to Grover Cleveland. As chairman of the New York state tax commission, his Local Taxation (1871) was a highly influential analysis. The problem was New York was losing business to neighboring states with lower taxes. He was an active consultant to the railroad industry.

He served as delegate to the Democratic National Conventions, and ran unsuccessfully for Congress from Connecticut in 1876 and 1890, and he made many speeches in each of Cleveland's campaigns.

Wells died at Norwich, Connecticut, which had been his residence since 1870. He was married, May 9, 1860, to Mary Sanford Dwight, by whom he had one son; a second wife and a son survived him.

== Writings ==
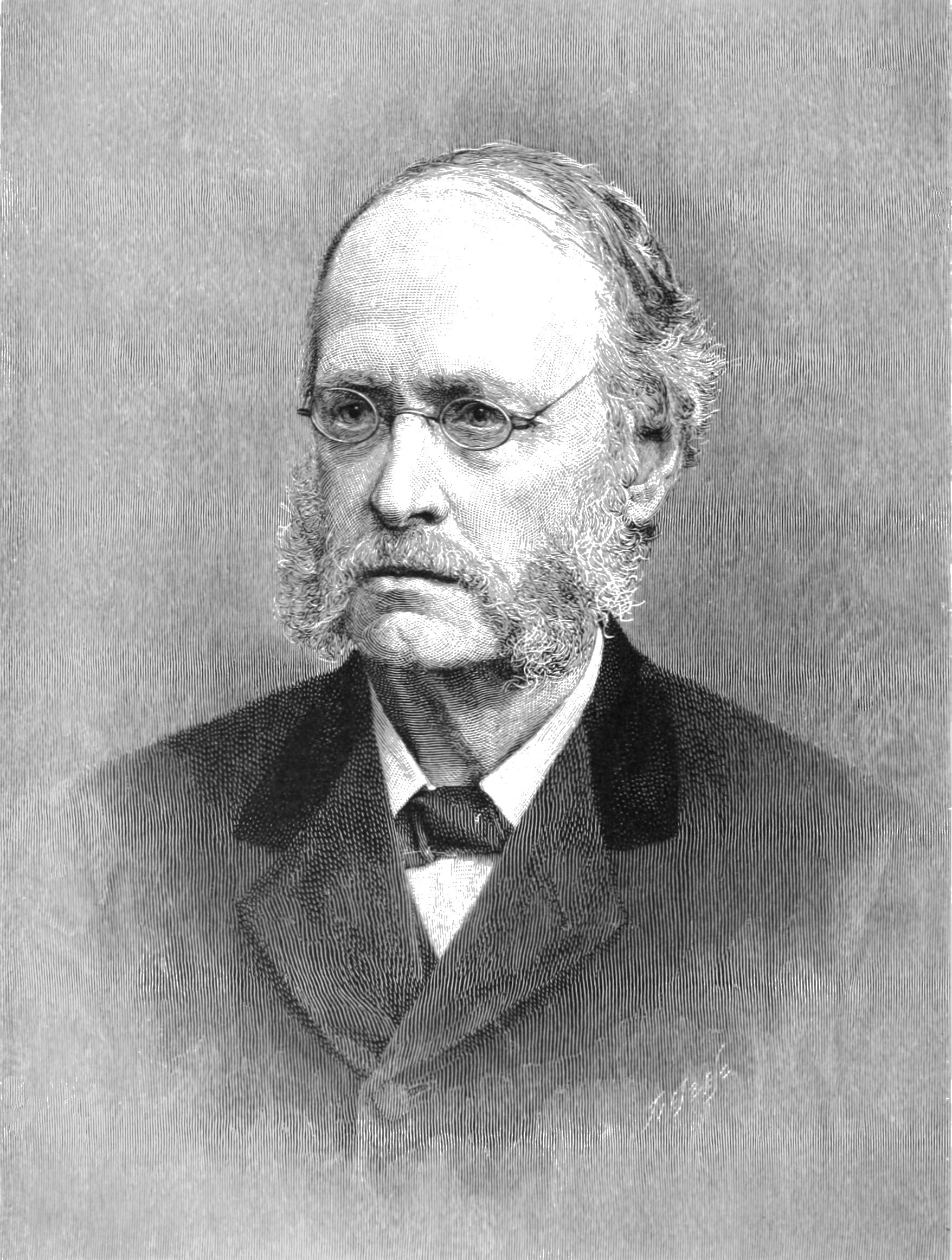
Portrait of Wells published in the Popular Science Monthly

Wells wrote extensively on current economic issues, especially on tariffs, the theory of money and the currency question, and taxation. His goal was greater efficiency by progressive lowering of costs of production through the application of science. He was the foremost American authority on the economics of the emerging "the machine age." He argued that industrial depressions, with falling prices, were due not to insufficient supply of money, but to sudden and rapid increase in commodities. He strongly opposed inflationary monetary policies such as free silver, writing Robinson Crusoe's Money (1876; reissued 1896). Wells early emphasized that technological unemployment was displacing of men by machines. He urged the substitution of trained personnel for political hangers-on in tax bodies, sought to bring system into taxation, and was the inveterate foe of the general property tax as applied to intangibles. He fought against income taxes, especially in 1894. His writing style was characterized by simplicity, candor, and an extraordinary success in presenting statistics in a day when educated people did not understand percentages. He wrote The Relation of the Government to the Telegraph (1873); The Cremation Theory of Specie Resumption (1875); The Silver Question (1877); Why We Trade and How We Trade (1878); Our Merchant Marine (1882); A Primer of Tariff Reform (1884); Practical Economics (1885); A Study of Mexico (1887); Recent Economic Changes (1889), a major description and analysis of the national economy; Breakers Ahead: Cause of the Present Crisis (1896); and The Theory and Practice of Taxation (1900).

=== Recent Economic Changes ===
Recent Economic Changes and Their Effect on the Production and Distribution of Wealth and Well-Being of Society (1891) is a frequently cited reference for U.S. economic history of the late 19th century and is available in modern reprints. It is an account of the dramatic changes in the world economy transitioning into the Second Industrial Revolution in which Wells documented many of the changes in trade, such as triple expansion steam shipping, railroads, the effect of the international telegraph network and the opening of the Suez Canal. Wells also discussed the Long Depression and many causes of the great advances in productivity of the preceding 20 years. Wells noted that many of the government inquires on the “depression of prices” (deflation) found various reasons such as the scarcity of gold and silver. Wells showed that the U.S. money supply, especially the amount of gold and silver, actually rose significantly during the deflation. Wells pointed out that deflation only lowered the cost of goods that benefited from improved methods of manufacturing and transportation. Goods produced by craftsmen did not decrease in value, nor did many services, and the cost of labor actually increased. Also, deflation did not occur in countries that did not have modern manufacturing, transportation and communications.

Recent Economic Changes gives support to those who argue that economic growth in the late 19th century is significantly underestimated.
