= SS Arctic =

American transatlantic passenger and mail steamship (1850s)

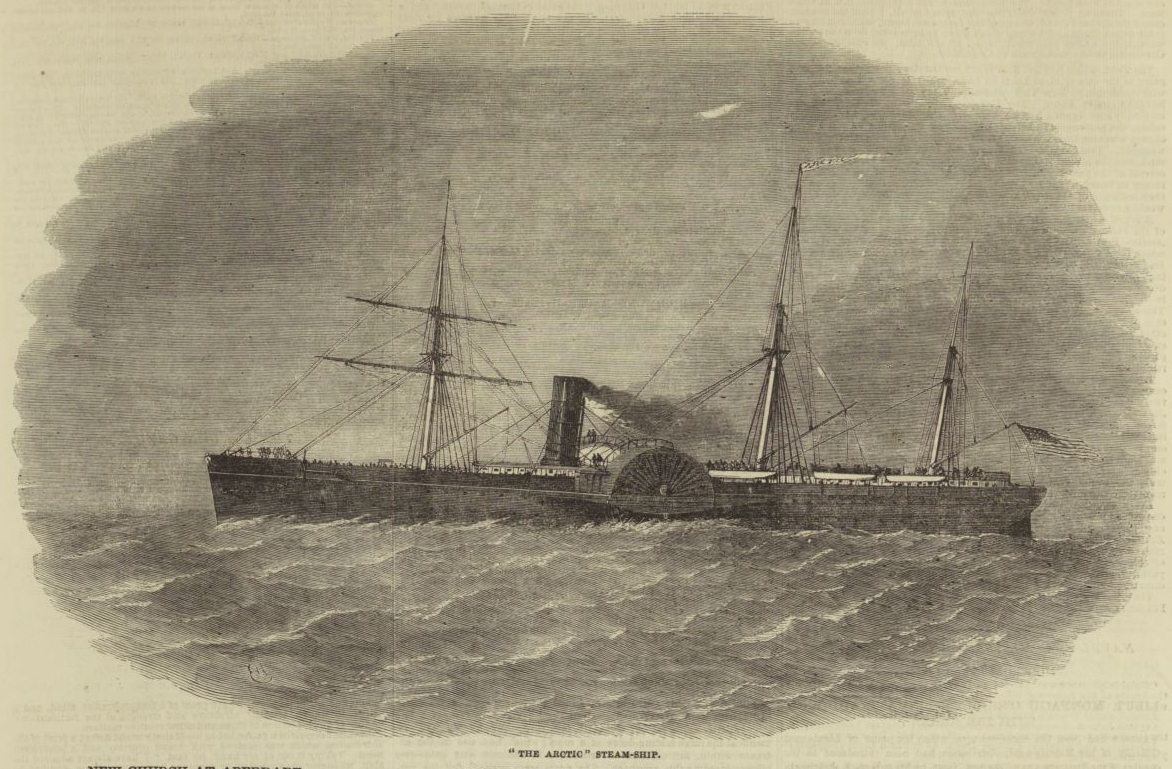
- The Arctic by Edwin Weedon for The Illustrated London News

History

United States
- Name: Arctic
- Namesake: Arctic
- Owner: Collins Line
- Route: New York-Liverpool
- Builder: William H Brown Shipyard - New York
- Launched: January 28, 1850
- Completed: 1850
- Maiden voyage: October 26, 1850
- In service: October 26, 1850
- Out of service: September 27, 1854
- Fate: Sank on September 27, 1854 after collision with SS Vesta

General characteristics
- Tons burthen: 2,856 American tons burthen
- Length: 284 feet (87 m)
- Beam: 45 feet (14 m)
- Draught: 19 feet (5.8 m)
- Depth: 32 feet (9.8 m)
- Installed power: 2,000 hp (1,500 kW)
- Propulsion: Two side-lever steam engines
- Capacity: Passengers: 200 1st class, 80 2nd class
- Crew: 153

SS Arctic was a 2,856-ton paddle steamer, which was one of the few Collins Line liners, which operated a transatlantic passenger and mail steamship service during the 1850s. She was the largest of a fleet of four, built with the aid of U.S. government subsidies to challenge the transatlantic supremacy of the British-backed Cunard Line. During her four-year period of service, the ship was renowned both for her speed and for the luxury of her accommodation.

On September 27, 1854, while on passage to New York from Liverpool, the Arctic collided in fog with the French steamer SS Vesta, a ship with little to no background, off the coast of Newfoundland, and sank four hours later. The Arctic's lifeboat capacity was around 180, enough for fewer than half those on board; the boats were launched in an atmosphere of panic and disorder, and the principle of "women and children first" was ignored. From around 400 on board (250 passengers, 150 crew), 24 male passengers and 64 crew survived; all the women and children died. No one was called to account for the disaster, and no official enquiry was held. Lifeboat provision on passenger-carrying ships remained inadequate until well into the 20th century.

== Background ==
The first shipping line to begin regular transatlantic steamer services was the British-backed Cunard Line, which began operating on July 4, 1840, with the departure from Liverpool of RMS Britannia, bound for Halifax, Nova Scotia, and Boston. As the principal transatlantic mail carrier, the Cunard Line received subsidies from the British government and from the United States Post Office Department; many Americans, however, thought that an American line should benefit from these subsidies. Thus, in 1845, the United States Postmaster General asked shipowners to tender for the right to operate a subsidized passenger and mail service between the U.S. and Europe. The successful bidder, announced on March 3, 1847, was Edward Knight Collins. On the basis of the mail contract Collins founded the New York and Liverpool United States' Mail Steamship Company, familiarly known as the Collins Line, and begin an ambitious steamship construction program.

== Construction and launching ==
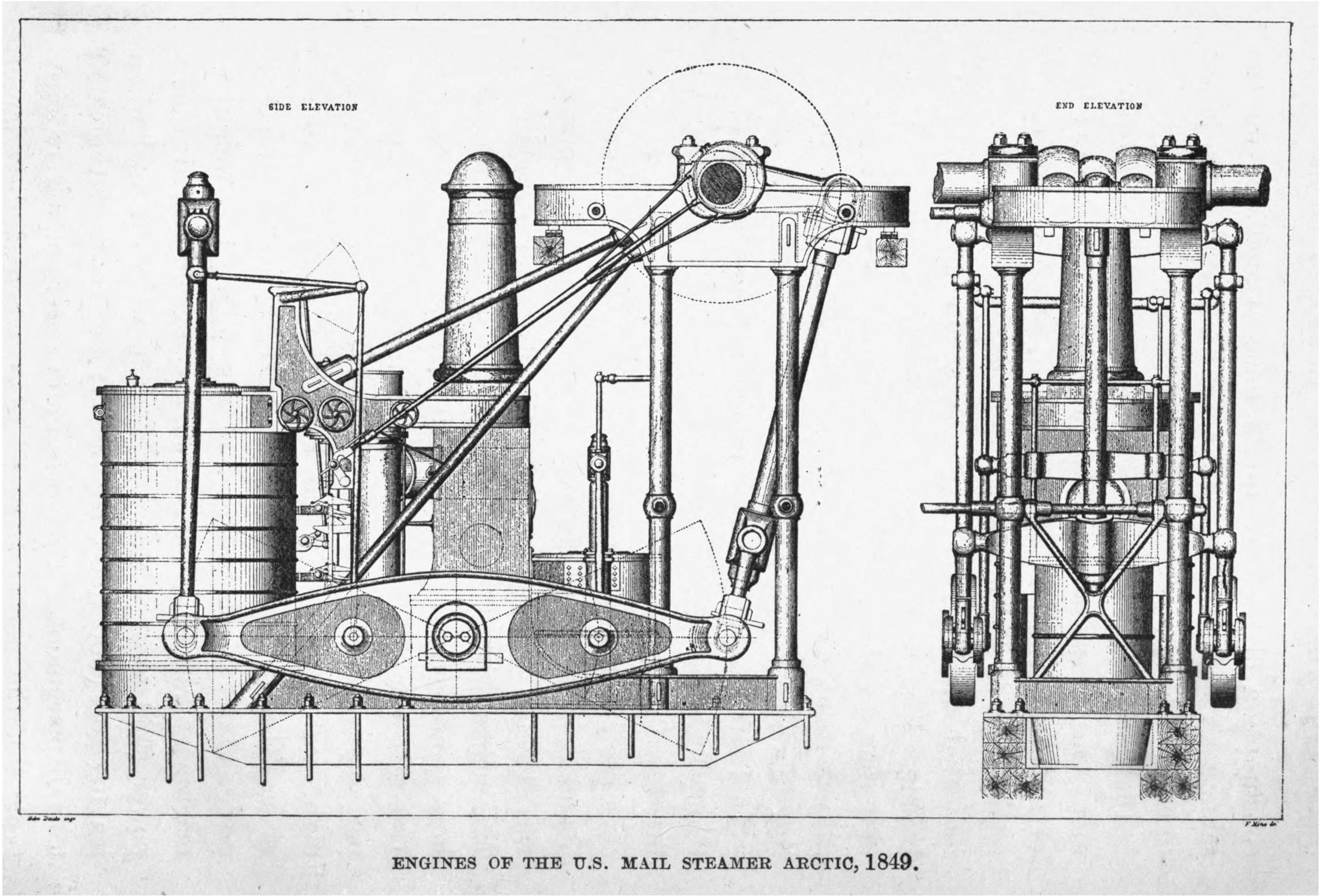
Diagram of her engines, 1850

The William H. Brown and the Jacob Bell shipyards were each contracted to build two large wooden paddle steamers, for use by Collins in a regular twice-monthly transatlantic mail service. The Collins line would receive an annual subsidy, initially of $385,000 a year, from the U.S. government. Part of the government's interest in the project lay in the potential of these ships for use in times of war; they were constructed in a manner that facilitated rapid conversion to warships should the need arise. Arctic, built at Brown's shipyard and designed by George Steers, was the third of the four ships to be launched, following SS Atlantic and SS Pacific, and was marginally the largest of the four. She was 284 feet (87 m) in length, and measured at 2,856 tonnage by the U.S. Custom House measurement then in use. Her two side-lever steam engines, which accounted for $250,000 of the total construction cost of $700,000, were built and fitted by Stillman, Allan and Company. Each generated 1,000 horsepower, turning the 35.5-foot (10.8 m) paddle wheels at 16 revolutions a minute at full speed. Like her sister ships, Arctic was built to a luxurious standard; a contemporary description refers to her furnishings and fittings as giving "an air of almost Oriental magnificence." The ladies' saloon was described as a "gorgeous yet beautiful apartment, brilliant with light [presenting] as cheerful a scene as the heart could crave."

Arctic was launched on January 28, 1850, from Brown's yard on New York's East River, before a large crowd. According to a press account, she was "the most stupendous vessel ever constructed in the United States, or the world, since the patriarchal days of Noah." The New York Herald's reporter described the crowd's reaction as the ship slid into the water: "Men waved their hats, ladies their handkerchiefs, in admiration of the glad event ... the thousands who witnessed her launch [stood] for nearly half an hour, contemplating the splendid vessel."

== Service history ==
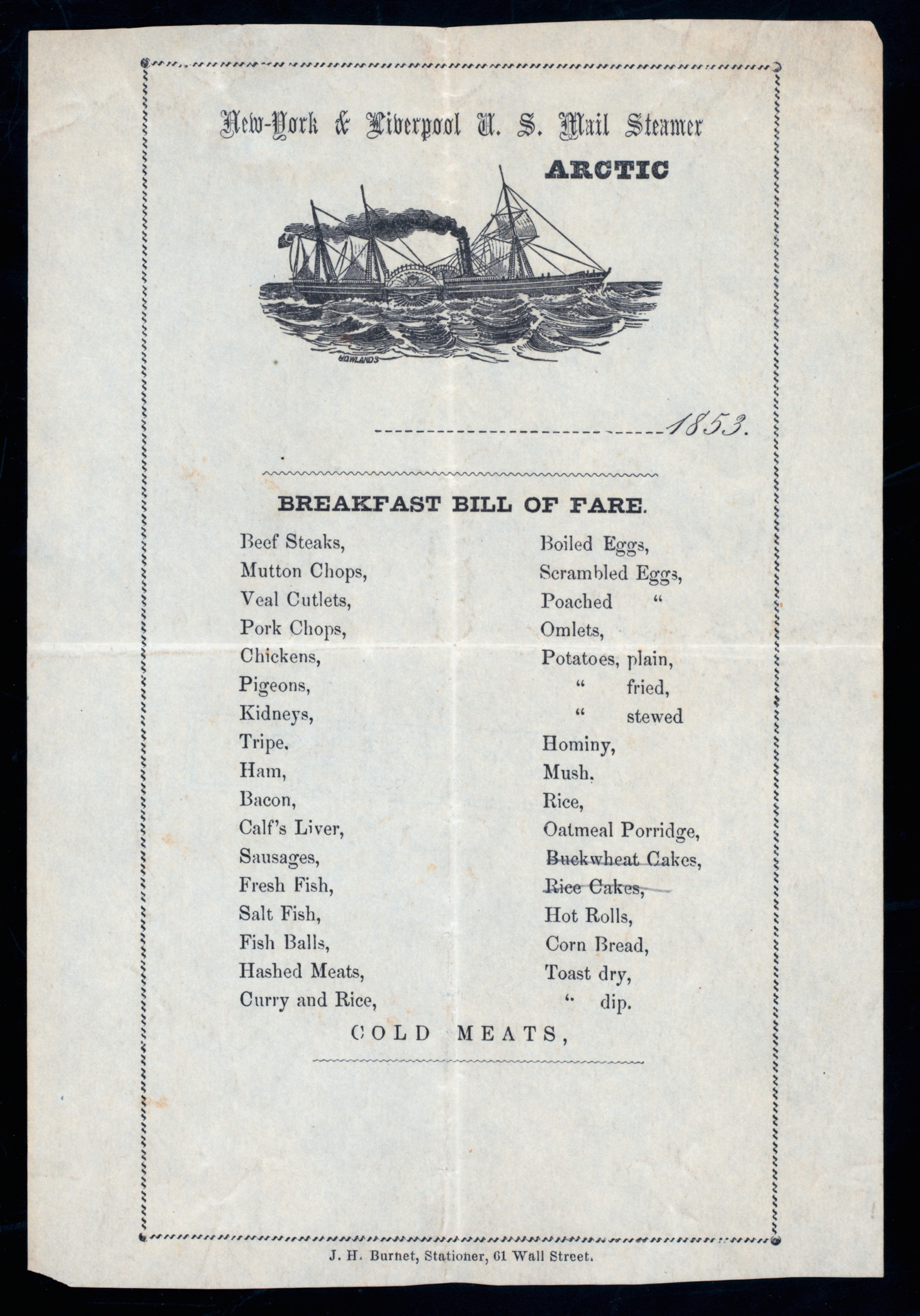
Breakfast Menu from SS Arctic dated 1853

Under her captain, James F. Luce, Arctic, now fully fitted out, underwent her sea trials during October 18–19, 1850, in preparation for entering regular transatlantic service on October 26. That first voyage, to Liverpool, passed without incident. In the years that followed, Arctic established a reputation as one of the fastest of ocean liners, regularly completing the crossing in ten days and sometimes less; in February 1852 she reached Liverpool in nine days, seventeen hours, considered an exceptional time for a winter crossing. She became the most celebrated of the Collins ships, and was known as the "clipper of the sea." On 23 November 1853, Arctic ran aground on the Burbo Bank, in Liverpool Bay whilst on a voyage from New York to Liverpool. She was refloated and taken in to Liverpool. On 18 May 1854, Arctic struck the Black Rock, off the coast of the Saltee Islands, County Wexford whilst on a voyage from Liverpool to New York. She was refloated and put back to Liverpool. In July 1854, Arctic's engines were adapted, in the hopes of reducing the heavy fuel costs that were helping to undermine the ship's profitability. The Baltimore Sun reported that the modifications were an invention of a Baltimore firm, Wethered Bros, and if successful, would reduce fuel costs by half. The powerful engines fitted to Arctic and her sisters strained their wooden hulls, and the line incurred large expenses in maintaining the vessels.

== Sinking ==
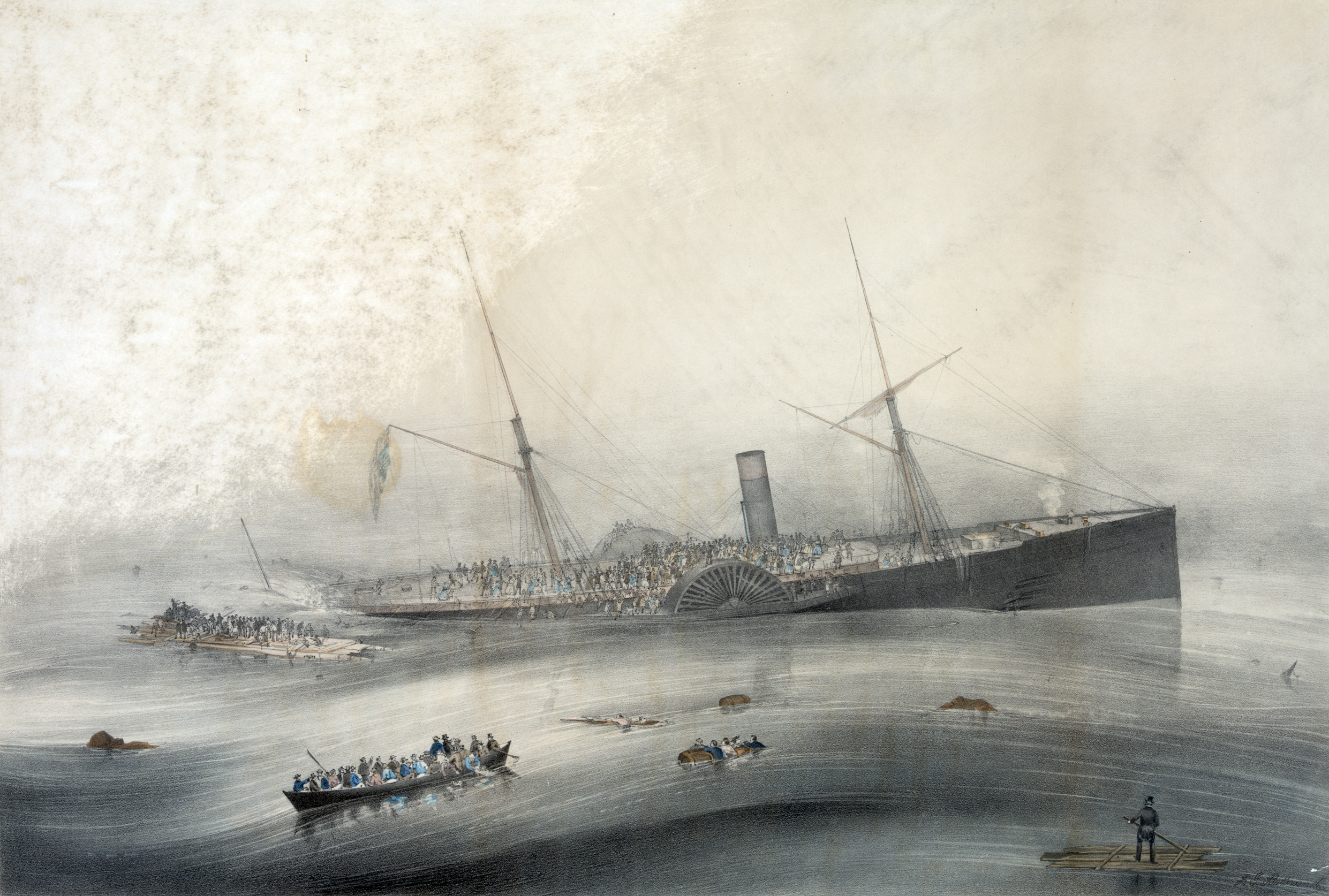
Arctic sinking by the stern after colliding with Vesta

On September 27, 1854, while en route to New York from Liverpool, Arctic collided with Vesta, a much smaller fishing vessel, 50 miles off the coast of Newfoundland. There were roughly 400 people on board Arctic – about 250 passengers and 150 crew. Captain Luce's first thought was to give assistance to the stricken Vesta, which appeared in danger of sinking, but when he was told that his own ship was holed beneath the waterline, he decided to make for the nearest land. As attempts to plug the leaks failed, Arctic's hull steadily filled with sea water. The boiler fires were gradually extinguished and the engines slowed and stopped, still far from land.

In accordance with the maritime regulations then in force, Arctic carried six lifeboats, the total capacity of which was around 180. Luce ordered these launched, but a breakdown in discipline among the crew meant that most places in the boats were taken by members of the crew or by the more able-bodied passengers; one of which was the French ambassador, the duc de Gramont who was observed jumping from the ship into one of the last lifeboats. Ship engineer Stewart Holland stayed at his post to fire a signal cannon on the sinking vessel; he did not survive.

The rest were left with makeshift rafts, or were unable to leave the ship and went down with her when she sank, four hours after the collision. Captain Luce, himself, unlike his crew, went down with his ship, although he survived. Meanwhile, Vesta, which appeared to have sustained mortal damage, was saved from sinking by her watertight bulkheads, and was able to gain the harbour at St. John's, Newfoundland.

Two of the six lifeboats that left Arctic safely reached the Newfoundland shore, and another was picked by a passing steamer which also rescued a few survivors from improvised rafts. Among these was Captain Luce, who had regained the surface after initially going down with the ship. He was rescued after clinging to wreckage of the paddle-wheel box for two days. The other three boats disappeared without trace.

In all, more than 300 people died; the 88 survivors included 64 of the crew and 24 male passengers. All the women and children on board perished. Among those lost were the wife of Edward Collins and two of his children. Other victims included several members of the Brown family, whose bank, Brown Brothers, had helped to finance the Collins Line. Also lost were Frederick Catherwood, the English architect and painter whose name was mysteriously left off the official casualty lists for weeks until a concerted effort by his friends and colleagues resulted in a belated inclusion by the authorities and newspapers, and Mahlon Day, a prominent New York publisher of children's books and business publications, with his wife and daughter. In addition to the tragic loss of human life, a rare copy of William Shakespeare's First Folio that New York lawyer and Shakespeare collector Aldon W. Griswold had purchased and shipped from Liverpool, was lost.

== Victims ==
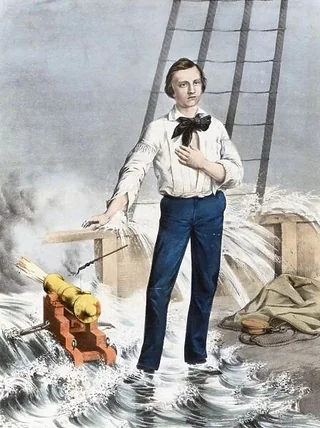
Stewart Holland lost on the SS Arctic firing signal gun

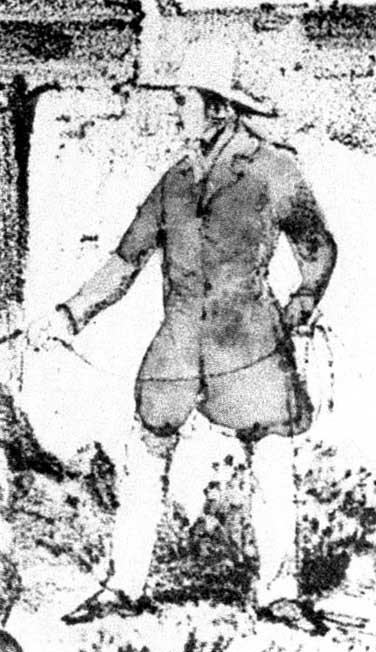
Frederick Catherwood

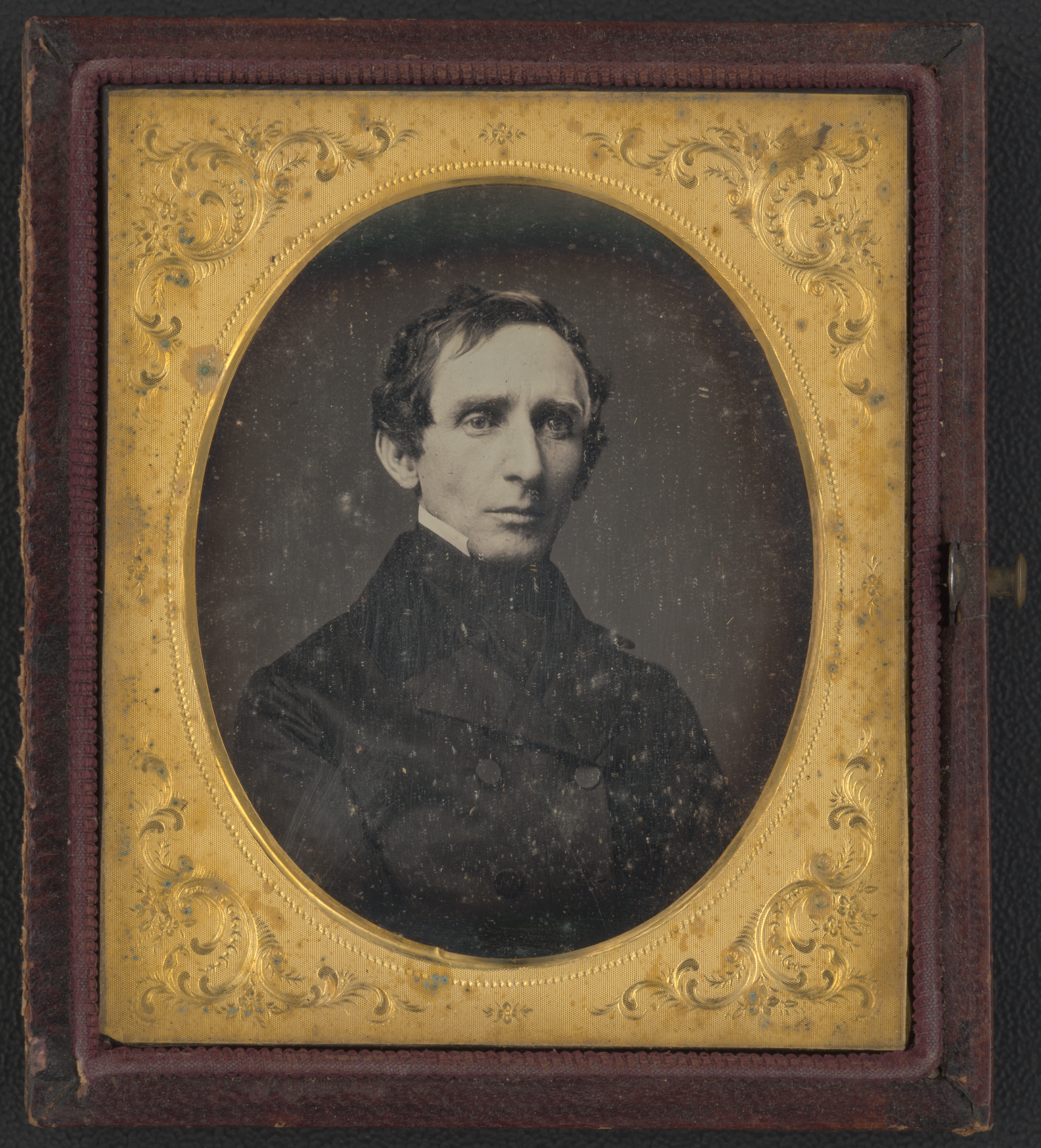
Henry Hope Reed

== Aftermath ==
The limited telegraph communications of the time meant that news of Arctic's loss did not reach New York until two weeks after the sinking. As the full story emerged, initial public sorrow at the ship's loss quickly turned to condemnation of the perceived cowardice of the crew, and their failure of duty towards their passengers. Although some newspapers demanded an inquiry into the disaster, none was held, and nobody was called to account for their actions. Proposals that lifeboat capacity on passenger-carrying vessels should be increased, to provide a place for every person on board, were not acted on. Captain Luce, who was generally exonerated from blame by the public, retired from the sea, and some of the surviving crew chose not to return to the US. The Collins Line continued its transatlantic service, until further maritime losses and insolvency led to its collapse in 1858.

James Brown, president of both Brown Brothers bank and the Collins Line, erected a grand monument in Green-Wood Cemetery, Brooklyn, New York, to the six members of his family lost in the Arctic disaster. The names of those who died are inscribed on the pedestal.

== See also ==
- SS Arctic disaster (27 September 1854)

== Citations ==
Records
Preceded by Pacific	Blue Riband (Eastbound record); 1852–1856	Succeeded by Persia
