= SS Vesta =

French iron screw steamer (1853–1875)

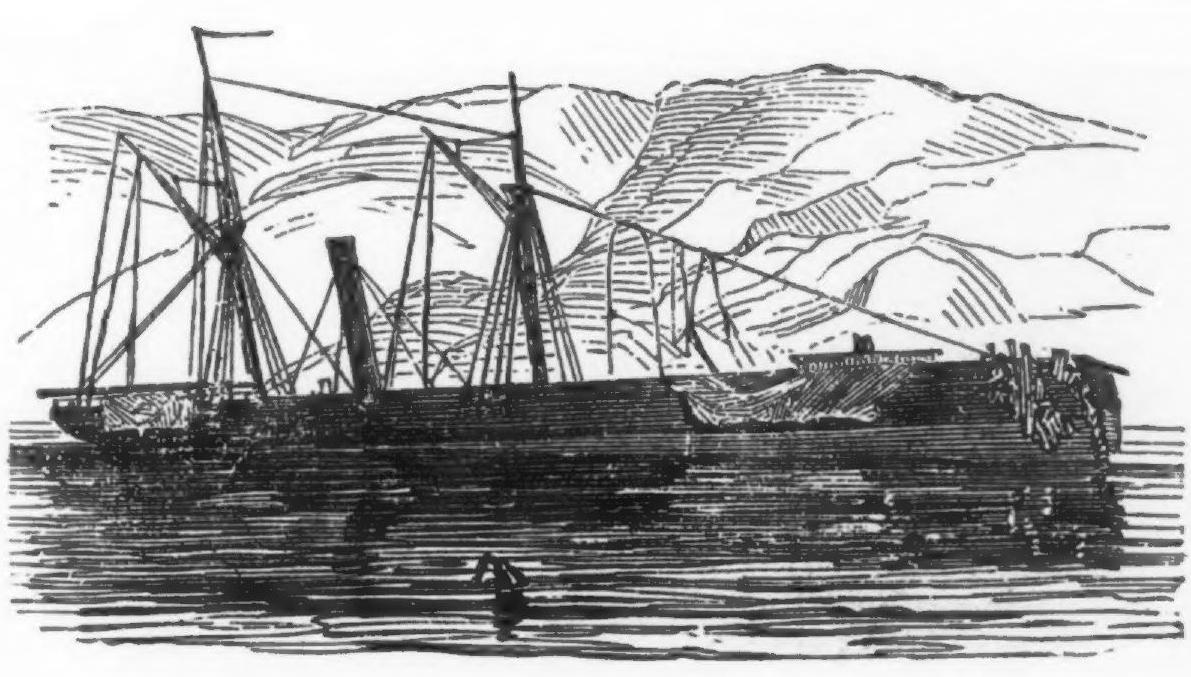
- From a wooden engraving showing the iron propeller ship Vesta as she appeared on the arrival at St Johns, Newfoundland.

History

France
- Name: SS Vesta
- Owner: Société Terreneuvienne (1853–1855); Compagnie Générale Maritime (1855–1863)
- Port of registry: Granville, France
- Completed: 1853
- Fate: Sold to Spain, 1863

Spain
- Name: SS Amberes
- Owner: J Amann
- Acquired: 1863
- Fate: Sunk in Santander harbour 1873

General characteristics
- Tonnage: 250 GRT
- Length: 46 m (152 ft)
- Beam: 6.2 m (20 ft 4 in)
- Draught: 3.2 m (10 ft 5 in)
- Installed power: Steam-powered
- Propulsion: Steam engine; 1 screw
- Sail plan: 3-masted

SS Vesta was a propeller-driven fishing vessel 250 gross tons, built in 1853 at Nantes, France, by Hernoux et Cie of Dieppe for the Société Terreneuvienne of Granville in Normandy. The ship completed her sea trials on July 7th, 1854. The company had extensive fishing interests in the Grand Banks area off Newfoundland, which it operated from a base in Saint Pierre Island. On 27 September 1854 Vesta was eastbound with a crew of 50, returning 147 fisherman and salters home. In a heavy fog, Vesta collided with the Collins Line passenger paddle steamer SS Arctic. A three-metre (ten-foot) section of Vesta's bow was sheared off, but the watertight bulkhead behind the bow remained intact and kept out the sea, keeping the vessel afloat.

The much larger Arctic, which initially had appeared to have sustained only superficial damage, had been fatally holed below the waterline. Lacking watertight compartments, the hull filled with water and the ship sank, four hours later, with great loss of life. By contrast, the only casualties from Vesta's crew and passengers were about a dozen who precipitately left the ship in a lifeboat, which was then accidentally run down by the Arctic.

After the collision, Vesta's captain, Alphonse Duchesne, brought the ship slowly to St John's, Newfoundland, which she reached on 29 September, and was repaired. On 20 March 1855 Vesta sailed for home, and was forced into Liverpool after fighting ice and storms for 17 days.

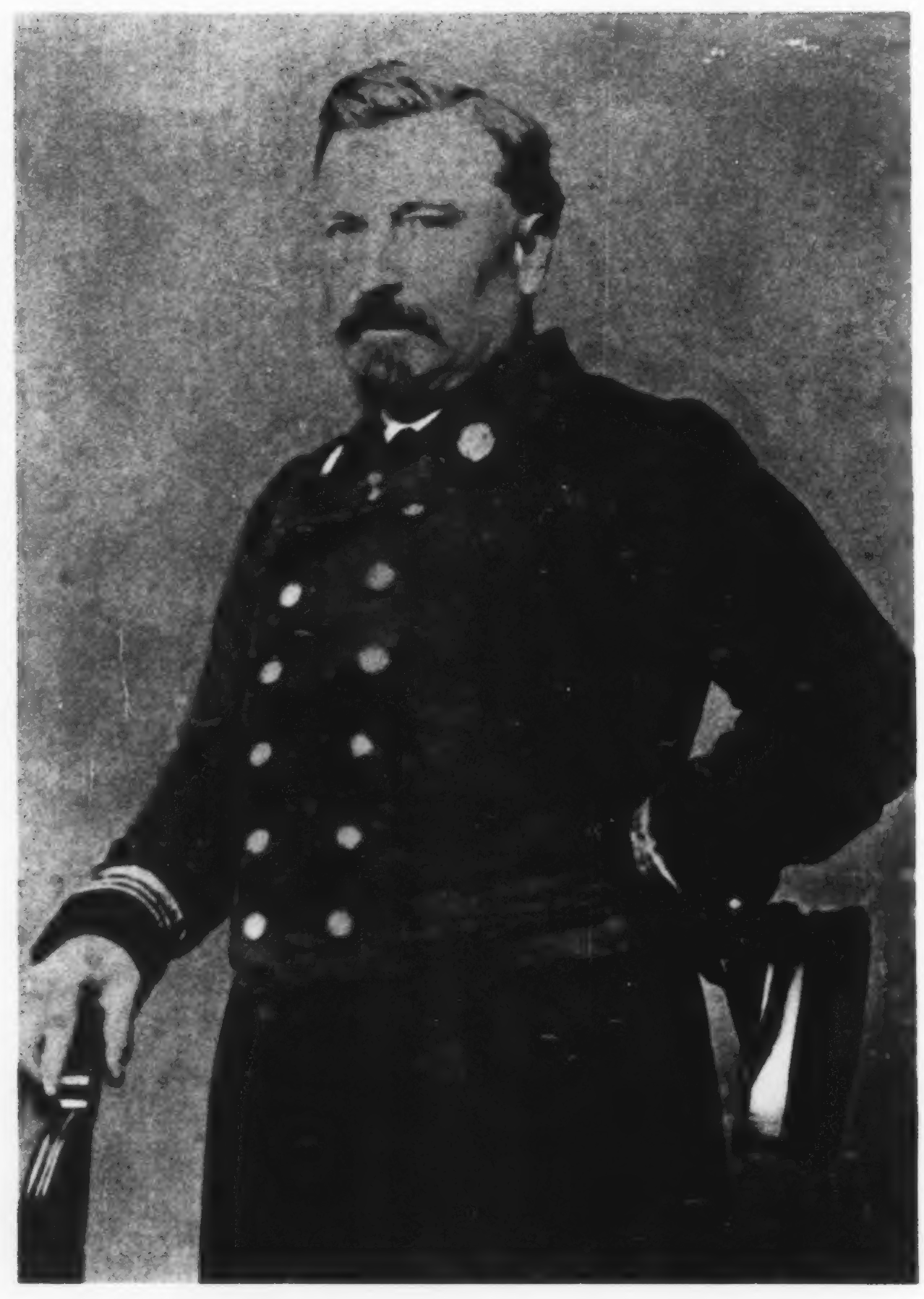
Captain Alphonse Duchesne, Master of the French steamship SS Vesta

Later that year she was sold to the Compagnie Générale Maritime of Le Havre, and ran services between Valencia to Le Havre, via Málaga, Gibraltar, Cádiz and Lisbon, advertising first class and second class cabins.

It passed, in 1863, to J Amann of Bilbao and was renamed Amberes. She was used as a freighter, generally working between northern Spanish ports and Antwerp. On December 13th, 1865, the ship, sailing from Bordeaux to Antwerp, collided with the Danish schooner Ornen, sailing from Gothenburg to Seville. Both ships were damaged, with Amberes receiving a hole in her side and losing some rigging. The schooner also took on water and the crew abandoned ship to Amberes, which later towed the Ornen to Dartmouth.

On March 27th, 1870, while 60 miles southwest of the Eddystone Lighthouse, steaming from Bayonne to Antwerp, the Amberes' boiler burst around 5pm. The ship's crew were uninjured, and she went under tow of the Britannia, arriving in the Plymouth Sound in the morning of the 28th of March. By June 1870, the ship was repaired for the price of £1200.

On December 9th, 1873, the ship sank in Santander harbour, while carrying a cargo of flour, leading to the extension of a pier.

== See also ==
- SS Arctic disaster

== Notes and references ==
=== Sources ===
- A.C. Brown: Women and Children Last. Frederick Muller, London 1962
- William H Flayhart: Perils of the Atlantic: Steamship Disasters, 1850 to the Present. W.W. Norton, New York 2003
- Lincoln P Paine: Ships of the World: An Historical Encyclopedia. Houghton Mifflin, Boston 1997
- David W Shaw: The Sea Shall Embrace Them. The Free Press, New York 2002
