= List of Ireland-related topics =

Non-exhaustive list of articles related to Ireland, grouped by selected topics

This page aims to list articles related to the island of Ireland. This list is not necessarily complete or up to date; if you see an article that should be here but is not (or one that should not be here but is), please update the page accordingly.
Recent changes: Irish topics

== Architecture ==
- Architects' Alliance of Ireland
- Architectural Association of Ireland
- Architecture of Ireland
- Castles in Ireland
- Irish Architectural Archive
- Heritage Council
- Historic houses
  - Northern Ireland
  - Republic of Ireland
- Irish Georgian Society
- List of monastic houses in Ireland
- List of Irish towns with a Market House

- Notable buildings
  - American Embassy
  - Áras an Uachtaráin
  - Chambered cairn
  - Farmleigh
  - Four Courts
  - Irish Houses of Parliament
  - Leinster House
  - Liberty Hall
  - Irish round tower
  - Spire of Dublin
- Royal Institute of the Architects of Ireland

== Communications ==
- An Post
  - Dublin postal districts
  - General Post Office
  - People on the postage stamps of Ireland
  - Postage stamps of Ireland
    - Definitive postage stamps of Ireland
  - Postal addresses in the Republic of Ireland

- Broadcasting Authority of Ireland
- BT Ireland
- Commission for Communications Regulation
- Telecommunications in the Republic of Ireland
- Eir
- HEAnet
- Proposed British Isles fixed sea link connections

- Irish Broadband
- IE Domain Registry
- Internet Neutral Exchange
- IrelandOffline
- ITnet
- Three Ireland
- Vodafone Ireland

== Culture ==
- Aosdána
- Celts
  - Celtic art
  - Celtic calendar
    - Imbolc (1 February)
    - Beltane (1 May)
    - Lughnasadh (1 August)
    - Samhain (1 November)
    - Halloween (31 October)
  - Modern Celts
- Chief of the Name
- Craic
- Cúirt International Festival of Literature
- Culture of Ireland
- Gaeltacht
  - Gaeltarra Éireann
  - Údarás na Gaeltachta
- Gaels
- Irish people
- Irish art
  - List of Irish artists
  - Migration Period art
  - National Gallery of Ireland
  - Hugh Lane Gallery
  - Irish Museum of Modern Art
  - Ulster Museum
  - Kerlin Gallery
- Public holidays in the Republic of Ireland
  - Saint Patrick's Day (17 March)
- Other notable dates
  - Bloomsday (16 June)
  - Quarter days
- Irish Catholics

- Irish dance
  - Jig
  - Step dance
  - Reel
  - Riverdance
- Irish diaspora
  - Irish Americans
  - Irish Australians
  - Irish Canadians
  - Irish Newfoundlanders
  - Irish Quebecers
  - Irish migration to Great Britain
  - Irish immigration to Puerto Rico
  - Irish immigration to Mexico
  - Irish military diaspora
    - Saint Patrick's Battalion
  - The Gathering Ireland 2013
- Irish prose fiction
  - List of Irish novelists
  - List of Irish short story writers
- Irish film
- Irish literature
- Irish mythology
  - Banshee
  - Leprechaun
  - Oisín
  - Ossian
  - Tír na nÓg
  - Púca
  - Will-o'-the-wisp
- Irish poetry
  - List of Irish poets
- Irish Social Season

- Irish theatre
  - Abbey Theatre
  - List of Irish dramatists
- Irish Travellers
  - Shelta
- List of Irish cultural institutions
- List of Irish people
- Music of Ireland
  - National Anthem
  - Bagpipes
  - Donegal fiddle tradition
  - Great Irish warpipes
  - List of Irish ballads
  - The Fields of Athenry
  - Uilleann pipes
- National symbols
  - Flag
    - List of flags of Ireland
    - List of flags used in Northern Ireland
  - Coat of arms of Ireland
  - Harp / Celtic harp
  - Shamrock
- Nettlemas
- Orange Order
- Pejorative
  - Anti-Irish sentiment
  - An Irish solution to an Irish problem
  - GUBU
  - Paddywagon
  - Scoti
  - Taig
  - West Brit
- List of public art in Dublin
- An Tóstal

== Economy ==
- Airtricity
- Banknotes of the Republic of Ireland
  - Series A Banknotes
  - Series B Banknotes
  - Series C Banknotes
- Bewley's
- Big Four
  - Bank of Ireland
  - First Trust Bank
  - Northern Bank
  - Ulster Bank
- Big Four
  - Allied Irish Banks
  - Bank of Ireland
  - Danske Bank
  - Ulster Bank
- Bord na Móna

- Camara
- Celtic Tiger
- Central Bank of Ireland
- Central Statistics Office
- Coins of the Republic of Ireland
  - Irish euro coins
  - Irish pound coin
- Companies Registration Office
- DeLorean Motor Company
- Demographics of the Republic of Ireland
- Deposit interest retention tax
- Economy of Northern Ireland
- Economy of the Republic of Ireland
- Élan
- Electricity Supply Board
- Ervia
- Financial services in the Republic of Ireland
- Guinness
  - Guinness World Records

- IDA Ireland
- Intel Ireland
- Irish pound
- Irish Stock Exchange
- Irish Taxi Council
- Laser debit card
- Irish linen
- List of companies of Ireland
- Natural resources of the Republic of Ireland
  - Irish Conservation Box
- Northern Ireland Electricity
- Permanent TSB
- Personal Public Service Number
- Product liability in the Republic of Ireland
- Irish property bubble
- State-sponsored bodies of the Republic of Ireland
- Suas Educational Development
- Taxation in the Republic of Ireland
- Tourism in the Republic of Ireland
- Water supply and sanitation in the Republic of Ireland

== Education ==
- Education in the Republic of Ireland
  - Central Applications Office
  - Gaisce – The President's Award
  - Graduate diploma
  - Higher Certificate
  - Higher diploma
  - Higher Education Authority
  - List of Irish learned societies
  - List of schools in the Republic of Ireland
    - List of schools in County Dublin
  - List of higher education institutions in the Republic of Ireland

- National Institute for Higher Education
- Institutes of technology in Ireland
- National Qualifications Authority of Ireland
  - Further Education and Training Awards Council
  - Higher Education and Training Awards Council
    - National Certificate
    - National Diploma
- Postgraduate diploma
- Postgraduate Applications Centre

- State Examinations Commission
  - Junior Certificate
  - Leaving Certificate
- Education and Training Board
- Vocational Education Committee
- Education in Northern Ireland
  - Council for the Curriculum, Examinations & Assessment
  - Lists of schools in Northern Ireland
  - List of universities in Northern Ireland
- Union of Students in Ireland
- Young Scientist and Technology Exhibition

== Food and beverages ==
- Baileys Irish Cream
- Bangers
- Black and Tan
- Boxty
- Cidona
- Irish breakfast
- Irish coffee

- Irish cuisine
- Irish stew
- Irish whiskey
- Poitín
- Potato bread/cake/farls/fadges
- Rashers
- Red lemonade

- Saint Brendan's
- Soda bread
- Stout
- Tayto
- Tripe and Drisheen
- Tanora
- Veda bread

== Geography ==
- Geography of Ireland
  - Drumlin
  - Peat bog
  - Rockall

- Conservation
  - Northern Ireland
  - Republic of Ireland

- Coastal landforms of Ireland
- List of bays of the British Isles (Ireland)
- List of loughs of Ireland

=== Places ===
- Aran Islands
- Areas of Outstanding Natural Beauty in Northern Ireland
- List of castles in Ireland
- Cities in Ireland
  - Armagh
  - Belfast
  - Cork
  - Derry
  - Dublin
  - Galway
  - Kilkenny
  - Limerick
  - Lisburn
  - Newry
  - Waterford
- Clochán
- Counties of Ireland
- Crannog
- Dál Fiatach
- Dál nAraidi
- Dál Riata
- Dublin Zoo
- Scotia
- Ulaid
- Gardens
  - Northern Ireland
  - Republic of Ireland
- Greater Dublin Area
- Ha'penny Bridge
- Islands of the North Atlantic
- Hill of Tara
- Lighthouses in Ireland
- Lightvessels in Ireland
- List of archaeological sites in County Cork
- List of Dublin postal districts
- List of Irish place names in other countries
- List of mountains and hills of County Dublin
- List of rivers of County Dublin
- Museums
  - Northern Ireland
  - Republic of Ireland
- Nature reserves in Northern Ireland
- List of national parks of the Republic of Ireland
- Passage grave
- Provinces of Ireland
  - Connacht
  - Leinster
  - Munster
  - Ulster
- Regions of the Republic of Ireland
  - Eastern and Midland Region
    - Dublin
    - Mid-East
    - Midland
  - Southern Region
    - Mid-West
    - South-East
    - South-West
  - Northern and Western Region
    - Border
    - West
- Rock of Cashel
- Tourist attractions in Ireland
- Towns and villages
  - Northern Ireland
  - Republic of Ireland
- World Heritage Site
  - Giant's Causeway
  - Newgrange
  - Skellig Michael

== History ==
- Air India Flight 182
- All-for-Ireland League
- Anglo-Irish
  - Anglo-Irish Treaty
  - Anglo-Irish trade war
  - Anglo-Irish Agreement
- Articles 2 and 3 of the Constitution of Ireland
- Battle of Dublin
- Battle of the Boyne
- Belfast Agreement ("Good Friday Agreement")
- Belfast blitz
- Black and Tans
- Blueshirts
- Bloody Sunday (1920)
- Bloody Sunday (1972)
- Boundary Commission
- Catholic emancipation
- Cliathairi
- Coat of arms of Ireland
- Congested Districts Board for Ireland
- Confederate Ireland
- Conradh na Gaeilge
- Connaught Rangers
- Conscription Crisis of 1918
- Committee on Evil Literature
- Council of Ireland
- Council of Irish Genealogical Organisations
- Cromwellian conquest of Ireland
- Cumann na mBan
- Desmond Rebellions
- Easter Rising
  - Proclamation of the Republic
- Erin go bragh
- External Relations Act
- Garden of Remembrance
- Garda Síochána
- Gerrymander
- Government of Ireland Act 1920
- Great Irish Famine
  - Legacy
- Great Seal of the Irish Free State
- Great Seal of Northern Ireland

- History of Ireland
  - History of Ireland (400–800)
  - List of High Kings of Ireland
  - History of Northern Ireland
    - History of Derry
  - History of the Republic of Ireland
    - History of Dublin
    - History of Limerick
    - History of Galway
    - History of Waterford
  - Timeline of Irish history
  - List of years in Ireland
- Irish conflicts
- Irish Civil War
- Irish Coercion Act
- Irish Convention
- Irish Crown Jewels
- Irish Declaration of Independence
- Irish diaspora
- Irish Famine (1879)
- Irish Guards
- Irish Home Rule movement
- Irish House of Commons
- 1923 Irish Hunger Strikes
- Irish Hunger Strike (1981)
- Irish Land Acts
- Irish Land and Labour Association
- Irish Land Commission
- Irish military diaspora
- Irish National Land League
- Irish National War Memorial Gardens
- Irish nobility
- Irish neutrality during World War II
- Irish Parliamentary Party
- Irish Famine (1740–41)
- Irish Rebellion of 1641
- Irish Rebellion of 1798
- Irish Reform Association
- Irish State Coach
- Irish Volunteers
- Irish War of Independence
- Irish Victoria Cross recipients
- Irish 10th Division, 1914
- Irish 16th Division, 1914
- Island of Ireland Peace Park
- Land Conference
- Last Light Ceremony
- Local Government (Ireland) Act 1898

- Magdalene laundries in Ireland
- Maze Prison
- Megalith
- Message to the Free Nations of the World
- Military of Ireland
- More Irish than the Irish themselves
- National Volunteers
- New Departure
- Nuclear Energy Board
- Norse–Gaels
- Nine Years' War
- Oath of Allegiance
- Old English
- Omagh bombing
- Penal Laws (Britain)
- Penal Laws (Ireland)
- Plan of Campaign
- Protestant Ascendancy
- Rome Rule
- Royal Inniskilling Fusiliers
- Royal Irish Constabulary
- Royal Ulster Rifles
- Royal Dublin Fusiliers
- Royal Munster Fusiliers
- Seal of the president of Ireland
- Siege of Derry
- Statutes of Kilkenny
- Statute of Westminster 1931
- Sunningdale Agreement
- Tenant Right League
- The Emergency (Ireland)
  - Plan Kathleen
  - Plan W
  - Operation Green
  - Operation Lobster
  - Operation Lobster I
  - Operation Seagull
  - Operation Seagull I
  - Operation Seagull II
  - Operation Whale
  - Operation Osprey
  - Operation Sea Eagle
  - Operation Mainau
  - Operation Innkeeper
- The Pale
- The Troubles
- United Irish League

== Ideologies ==
- Ancient Order of Hibernians
- Irish nationalism
  - Irish republicanism
    - Irish National Liberation Army
    - Irish Republican Army
      - Irish Republican Army (1919–1922)
      - Irish Republican Army (1922–1969)
      - Official Irish Republican Army
      - Provisional Irish Republican Army
        - Continuity Irish Republican Army
        - Real Irish Republican Army
    - Irish Republican Brotherhood

- Unionism in Ireland
  - Ulster loyalism
    - Red Hand Commando
    - Ulster Defence Association
    - Ulster Volunteer Force
      - Loyalist Volunteer Force
- Irish neutrality

== Law ==
- Abortion in Ireland
- Same-sex marriage in the Republic of Ireland
- Courts of the Republic of Ireland
  - Supreme Court
  - High Court
  - Court of Appeal
  - Circuit Court
  - District Court
  - Special Criminal Court

- Legislation
  - Government of Ireland Act 1920
  - Law of the Republic of Ireland
    - Constitution
      - Dáil Constitution (1919)
      - Constitution of the Irish Free State (1922)
      - Constitution of Ireland (1937)
        - Constitutional amendments
    - Freedom of Information Act 1997
    - Local Government (Ireland) Act 1898
    - Republic of Ireland Act 1948
  - Northern Ireland Act 1998

- Policing
  - Garda Síochána
  - Police Service of Northern Ireland
- List of High Court judges of Northern Ireland
- Referendum on the European Constitution
- Warrant of Appointment

== Language ==
- Goidelic substrate hypothesis
- Celtic languages
- Proto-Celtic language
- Insular Celtic languages
- Goidelic languages
- Gaelic
  - Ogham
  - Primitive Irish
  - Old Irish
  - Middle Irish
  - Irish language
    - Connacht Irish
    - Munster Irish
    - Ulster Irish
    - Irish initial mutations

    - Irish language in Northern Ireland
    - Irish language in Newfoundland
    - Irish language outside Ireland
    - Irish conjugation
    - Irish declension
    - Irish grammar
    - Irish name
    - Irish orthography
    - Irish phonology
    - Irish syntax
    - Irish words used in the English language
    - Modern literature in Irish
    - Place names in Ireland
    - English words of Irish origin
    - Manx language
    - Scottish Gaelic

- Hiberno-English
- Scots language
  - Ulster Scots dialect
- Shelta
- Yola
- Euro English

== Media ==
- Celtic Media Group
- Fair City
- Ros na Rún
- Father Ted
  - Craggy Island
- Independent News & Media
- Independent Media Center
- Jacob's Award
- List of newspapers in the Republic of Ireland
  - Irish Bulletin
  - The Irish Times
  - Iris Oifigiúil

- Newspaper Licensing Ireland
- Radio in the Republic of Ireland
  - RTÉ Radio 1
  - RTÉ 2fm
  - RTÉ lyric fm
  - RTÉ Raidió na Gaeltachta
  - Today FM
- BBC Radio Ulster
- BBC Northern Ireland

- List of Irish television channels
  - RTÉ One
  - RTÉ2
  - TG4
  - UTV
  - Virgin Media One
  - Virgin Media Two
  - Virgin Media Three
- Raidió Teilifís Éireann
- Thomas Crosbie Holdings

== Music ==
- Artists
  - Ciarán Farrell
  - The Boomtown Rats
  - Boyzone
  - The Cranberries
  - The Frames
  - The Dubliners
  - Christy Moore
  - Flogging Molly
  - Damien Rice
  - Patrick Cassidy
  - Celtic Woman
  - The Corrs
  - Enya
  - CMAT
  - Engine Alley

  - Maria Doyle Kennedy
  - Rory Gallagher
  - Horslips
  - Hozier
  - Bell X1
  - Eleanor McEvoy
  - Christy Moore
  - Van Morrison
  - Delia Murphy
  - My Bloody Valentine
  - Chris de Burgh
  - Maura O'Connell
  - Sinéad O'Connor
  - Carmel Quinn
  - Dolores Keane
  - Samantha Mumba

  - Kevin Shields
  - Thin Lizzy
  - The Potbelleez
  - U2
  - Virgin Prunes
  - Westlife
  - The Wolfe Tones
  - Wreck of the Hesperus
- Music of Ireland
  - Celtic music
  - Donegal fiddle tradition
  - The Rare Old Mountain Dew
  - Country and Irish

== Nationhood ==
- Aspirational
  - Republic of Connacht
  - Munster Republic
  - United Ireland
- Historical
  - Erin
  - Hibernia

- Irish states since 1171
  - Lordship of Ireland (1171–1541)
  - Kingdom of Ireland (1541–1800)
    - Confederate Ireland (1641–1649)
  - United Kingdom of Great Britain and Ireland (1801–1922)
    - Northern Ireland (1921–present)
    - Southern Ireland (1921–1922)
  - Irish Republic (1919–1922)
  - Irish Free State (1922–1937)
  - Ireland (1937–present), sometimes called the Republic of Ireland (1949–present)

== Officials ==
- President of Ireland
  - Council of State
  - Presidential Commission
- Public service of the Republic of Ireland
- Republic of Ireland
  - Government of Ireland
  - Taoiseach (Prime Minister)
  - Tánaiste (Deputy Prime Minister)
    - Minister for Agriculture, Food and the Marine
    - Minister for Children, Disability and Equality
    - Minister for Defence
    - Minister for Education and Youth
    - Minister for Enterprise, Tourism and Employment
    - Minister for Climate, Energy and the Environment
    - Minister for Finance
    - Minister for Further and Higher Education, Research, Innovation and Science
    - Minister for Foreign Affairs and Trade
    - Minister for Health
    - Minister for Housing, Local Government and Heritage
    - Minister for Justice, Home Affairs and Migration
    - Minister for Public Expenditure, Infrastructure, Public Service Reform and Digitalisation
    - Minister for Rural and Community Development
    - Minister for Social Protection
    - Minister for Culture, Communications and Sport
    - Minister for Transport
      - Minister of State
      - Government Chief Whip
- Governments of Ireland
- Oireachtas Chairpersons
  - Cathaoirleach
  - Ceann Comhairle
- Opposition Front Bench
  - Leader of the Opposition
- Attorney General of Ireland

- Ombudsman
- Data Protection Commissioner
- Civil Service of the Republic of Ireland
- Lord Mayor of Cork
- Lord Mayor of Dublin
- First Minister and deputy First Minister of Northern Ireland
- Secretary of State for Northern Ireland
- Historical
  - Order of St Patrick
  - Chief Secretary for Ireland
  - High King of Ireland
  - Irish Free State (1922–1937)
    - Executive Council
      - President of the Executive Council
      - Vice-President of the Executive Council
    - Governor-General
  - Irish Republic (1919–1922)
    - Ministry of Dáil Éireann
      - President of Dáil Éireann
  - King of Ireland
  - Lord Chancellor of Ireland
  - Lord Chief Justice of Ireland
  - Lord Lieutenant of Ireland
  - Minister for the Co-ordination of Defensive Measures
  - Minister for Labour
  - Minister for Posts and Telegraphs
  - Minister for Supplies
  - Northern Ireland
    - Governor of Northern Ireland (1922–1973)
    - Prime Minister of Northern Ireland (1921–1972)
  - Provisional Government (1922)

== Politics ==
- Politics of the Republic of Ireland
- Politics of Northern Ireland
- Elections in the Republic of Ireland
  - Dáil election results
  - Irish Presidential Elections
- Elections in Northern Ireland
- Foreign relations of Ireland
  - Diplomatic missions of Ireland
  - Diplomatic missions in Ireland
- Irish trade unions
- List of Irish politicians
- Peerage of Ireland
  - Duke of Leinster
  - Duke of Abercorn

- Legislature
  - Oireachtas
    - Constitution of Ireland
      - Dáil Éireann
      - Seanad Éireann
  - Parliament of Ireland
    - Irish House of Commons
    - Irish House of Lords
  - Parliament of Northern Ireland
  - Parliament of Southern Ireland
    - House of Commons of Southern Ireland
    - Senate of Southern Ireland
  - Dáil Éireann (Irish Republic)
    - First Dáil
    - Second Dáil
    - 3rd Dáil
  - Oireachtas (Irish Free State)
    - Constitution of the Irish Free State
      - Dáil Éireann (Irish Free State)
      - Seanad Éireann (Irish Free State)
  - Northern Ireland Assembly
    - Northern Ireland Executive

- List of Irish political parties
  - Fianna Fáil
  - Fine Gael
  - Green Party
  - Labour Party
  - People Before Profit–Solidarity
  - Sinn Féin
  - Social Democrats
- List of political parties in Northern Ireland
  - Alliance Party of Northern Ireland
  - Democratic Unionist Party
  - Progressive Unionist Party
  - Republican Sinn Féin
  - Sinn Féin
  - Social Democratic and Labour Party
  - Ulster Unionist Party
- North/South Ministerial Council
- Celtic League

== Religion ==
- Abbeys and priories
- Ardbraccan
- Association of Baptist Churches in Ireland
- Book of Kells
- Cathedrals
- Church of Ireland
  - Anglican Communion
  - Christ Church Cathedral, Dublin
  - St Patrick's Cathedral, Dublin

- Dioceses
  - Church of Ireland
  - Roman Catholic
- Dublin Buddhist Centre
- Hinduism in Ireland
  - Hinduism in Northern Ireland
  - Hinduism in the Republic of Ireland
- History of the Jews in Ireland
- Islam in the Republic of Ireland
- Methodist Church in Ireland
- Presbyterian Church in Ireland
- Primates
  - Primate of Ireland (Archbishop of Dublin)
  - Primate of All Ireland (Archbishop of Armagh)
- Quakers Ireland Yearly Meeting

- Catholic Church in Ireland
  - Glasnevin Cemetery
  - Knock Shrine
  - St Mary's Cathedral
  - St. Nicholas Collegiate Church
  - St Patrick's Classical School
- Saints
  - Brendan
  - Brigid
  - Columba
  - Columbanus
  - St Finnian of Movilla
  - St Patrick
  - Margaret Ball
  - Charles of Mount Argus
- Sheela na gig
- U Dhammaloka

== Science and technology ==
- Department of Education and Youth
- Department of Further and Higher Education, Research, Innovation and Science
- Department of Enterprise, Tourism and Employment
- Dublin Institute for Advanced Studies
- Irish Centre for High-End Computing
- List of Irish botanical illustrators
- List of Irish scientists, engineers and inventors
- Royal College of Science for Ireland
- Science Foundation Ireland
- Young Scientist and Technology Exhibition

== Sport ==
A

- National Aquatic Centre

B

- Baseball Ireland
- Basketball Ireland
- Basketball Northern Ireland

C

- Cricket Ireland
- Community Games

F

- Fencing Ireland

G

- Gaelic Athletic Association
  - All-Ireland Senior Football Championship
  - All-Ireland Senior Hurling Championship
  - Camogie
  - Gaelic football
  - Hurling
  - Rounders
  - Gaelic handball

- Golf
  - 2006 Ryder Cup
  - Golf Ireland
  - Golf in Ireland
  - Professional Golfers' Association (Great Britain and Ireland)

H

- Hockey Ireland
- Horse racing
  - Coolmore Stud
  - Irish Derby
  - Irish National Stud
  - The Curragh

M

- Motorsport Ireland
- Motorcycling Ireland

O

- Ireland at the 2008 Summer Olympics

P

- Parachute Association of Ireland

R

- Rugby union
  - Irish Rugby Football Union
  - Ireland's Call
  - Ireland national rugby union team
  - United Rugby Championship

S

- Soccer
  - Northern Ireland
    - Irish Football Association
    - Northern Ireland Football League
    - Northern Ireland national football team
  - Republic of Ireland
    - Football Association of Ireland
    - League of Ireland
    - Republic of Ireland national football team
  - All-Ireland
    - Setanta Sports Cup
- Softball
- Stadiums
  - Aviva Stadium
  - Croke Park
  - List of GAA stadiums
  - Páirc Uí Chaoimh
  - Semple Stadium
  - Thomond Park
- Swim Ireland

T

- Tennis Ireland

U

- Underwater sports
  - Comhairle Fo-Thuinn
  - Northern Ireland Federation of Sub-Aqua Clubs

== Transport ==
- Transport in Ireland
- Airlines
  - Aer Lingus
  - CityJet
  - Eirjet
  - Ryanair
  - Skynet Airlines
- Airports
  - Belfast City
  - Belfast International
  - Cork
  - Derry
  - Dublin
  - Galway
  - Knock
  - Kerry
  - Shannon
  - Sligo

- Bus
  - Bus Éireann
  - Dublin Bus
- Canals
  - Grand Canal
  - Royal Canal
  - Shannon–Erne Waterway
- Common Travel Area
- Rail transport in Ireland
  - CIÉ
  - Heritage railways
    - Northern Ireland
    - Republic of Ireland
  - History of rail transport in Ireland
    - Armagh Rail Disaster
  - Iarnród Éireann (Irish Rail)
    - DART
    - Western Railway Corridor
  - Luas
  - Northern Ireland Railways

- Roads in Ireland
  - Motorways in the Republic of Ireland
  - National primary road
  - National secondary road
  - Regional road
  - Local roads in Ireland
  - Atlantic Corridor
  - Dublin Port Tunnel
  - Jack Lynch Tunnel
  - River Suir Bridge
  - Rose Fitzgerald Kennedy Bridge
  - History of roads in Ireland
  - Trunk roads in Ireland
  - Road signs in Ireland
  - Road speed limits in the Republic of Ireland
  - Vehicle registration plates of the Republic of Ireland
  - National Roads Authority
- Shipping
  - The Galway Line
  - Irish Continental Group
  - Irish Shipping
- Public Transport in Northern Ireland

== See also ==
- Lists of country-related topics - similar lists for other countries
