= NLI =

NLI may refer to:

- National Library of Iran
- National Library of Ireland
- National Library of Israel
- National Library of India
- Newspaper Licensing Ireland
- Northern Light Infantry
- National Letter of Intent
- Native-language identification
- Natural language inference
