= SS Adriatic (1856) =

American steamship

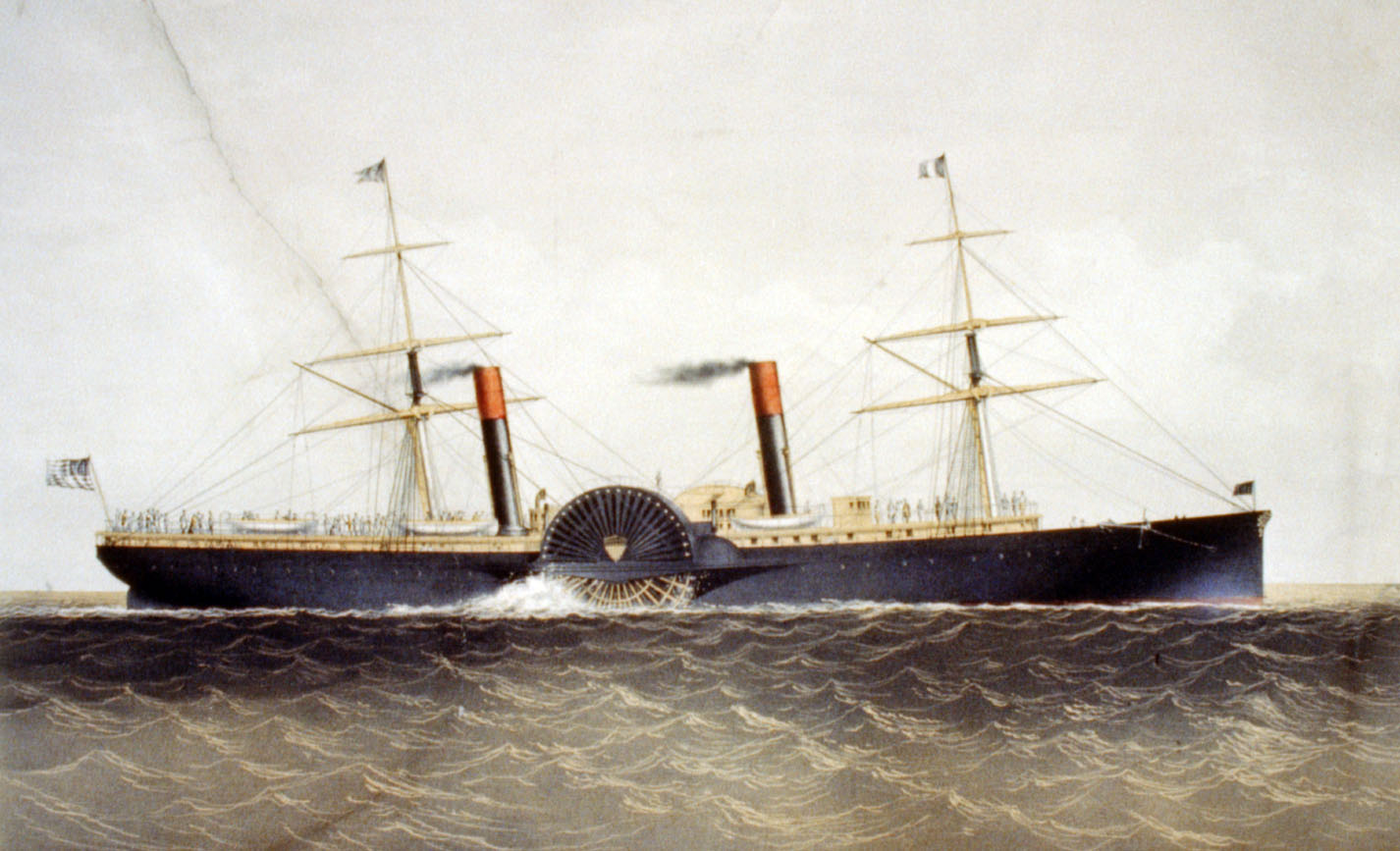
- Adriatic in Collins Line colors, c.1860

United States
- Name: Adriatic
- Namesake: Adriatic Sea
- Owner: Collins Line (1856-1859); North Atlantic Steamship Company (1859-1861)
- Builder: James and George Steers
- Launched: April 7, 1856
- Maiden voyage: November 23, 1857

United Kingdom
- Owner: Galway Line (1861-1869); Bates & Company (1869-1873); African Steam Ship Company (1873-1885)
- Out of service: 1885
- Fate: Abandoned 1885

General characteristics as originally built
- Tonnage: 3,670 GRT
- Displacement: 5,233 tons
- Length: 354 ft (108 m)
- Beam: 50 ft (15 m)
- Draft: 20 ft (6.1 m)
- Depth of hold: 33 ft 2 in (10.11 m)
- Installed power: Two Oscillating cylinder steam engines 2,800 ihp
- Propulsion: sail and steam engine
- Sail plan: 2-masted brig
- Speed: 13 knots
- Capacity: Passengers: 300 1st class, 100 2nd class
- Crew: 188 crew

Adriatic was a wooden-hulled, side-wheel steamship launched in New York in 1856. She was conceived as the largest, fastest, most luxurious trans-Atlantic passenger liner of her day, the pride of the Collins Line. At the time of her launch she was the largest ship in the world.

She made only one roundtrip for the Collins Line before that firm failed, partly because of Adriatic's high cost. She made five more roundtrips as a luxury liner, before she was sold to an English firm which reconfigured her to carry hundreds of Irish immigrants to America. In all, the ship made only twelve trans-Atlantic roundtrips, so while she may have been a triumph of American shipbuilding, none of her owners were successful. She ended her days as a hulk at the mouth of the Niger River as a floating coal depot to fuel ships better adapted to the commercial realities of the day. She was abandoned there in 1885.

== Construction and characteristics ==
In 1846, Edward K. Collins made a proposal to the United States Post Office. In return for a $385,000 annual subsidy, Collins would build a fleet of five ships that would sail between New York and Liverpool, carrying the mail, twice a month in the eight months of the year when the stormy North Atlantic was reasonably calm. He won the contract and established the New York and Liverpool United States Mail Steamship Company, which was universally shortened in common parlance to the Collins Line. Stewart Brown, and James Brown, representing the private banking firm Brown Brothers, were partners in and financial backers of the company.

Collins built only four ships, but the post office did not press the five-ship requirement in the mail contract. Then, in September 1854, the company's steamer Arctic was sunk. Pressure built on Collins to build another ship. This demand came at a financially strong time for the Collins Line. The early mechanical troubles with its three other ships, Atlantic, Baltic, and Pacific had been repaired and they were performing well. The mail subsidy had been increased to $858,000 per year, and passenger boardings had reached an all time high. Even the loss of Arctic, while tragic in its loss of life, produced $540,000 of insurance proceeds. Collins determined to build Adriatic as the largest, fastest, and most luxurious trans-Atlantic steamer of all time.

Adriatic was built in the shipyard of James and George Steers at the foot of 7th street in Manhattan. George Steers was a prominent shipbuilder of the day, and was already associated with the Collins Line having been foreman of the team that built Atlantic. Adriatic was launched on April 7, 1856 with significant festivities. One newspaper reported that 100,000 people had come to witness the launch. Collins chartered a ferry and invited two or three hundred guests to join him in the East River to watch. At 11 am Adriatic slid down the ways and kept going. First one anchor was dropped and then a second, but the ship had such momentum that her stern rammed into the docks on the Williamsburg side of the river and crushed 15 feet (4.6 m) of wharf before coming to a stop. A tug extricated her from the wreckage and towed her to the Great Balance Dock, a floating drydock, where she would have her bottom sheathed in thin copper plates to discourage marine growth and wood-boring worms.

Adriatic was the largest ship in the world when she was launched. She was 354 feet (108 m) long with a beam of 50 ft (15 m), and a depth of hold of 33 feet 2 inches (10.11 m). She displaced 5,233 tons at her design draft of 20 feet (6.1 m). Her hull was constructed of live and white oak, reinforced with iron strapping 5 inches (13 cm) wide and .875 inches (2.22 cm) thick. It was divided into eight watertight compartments, with bulkheads 6 inches (15 cm) thick between them.

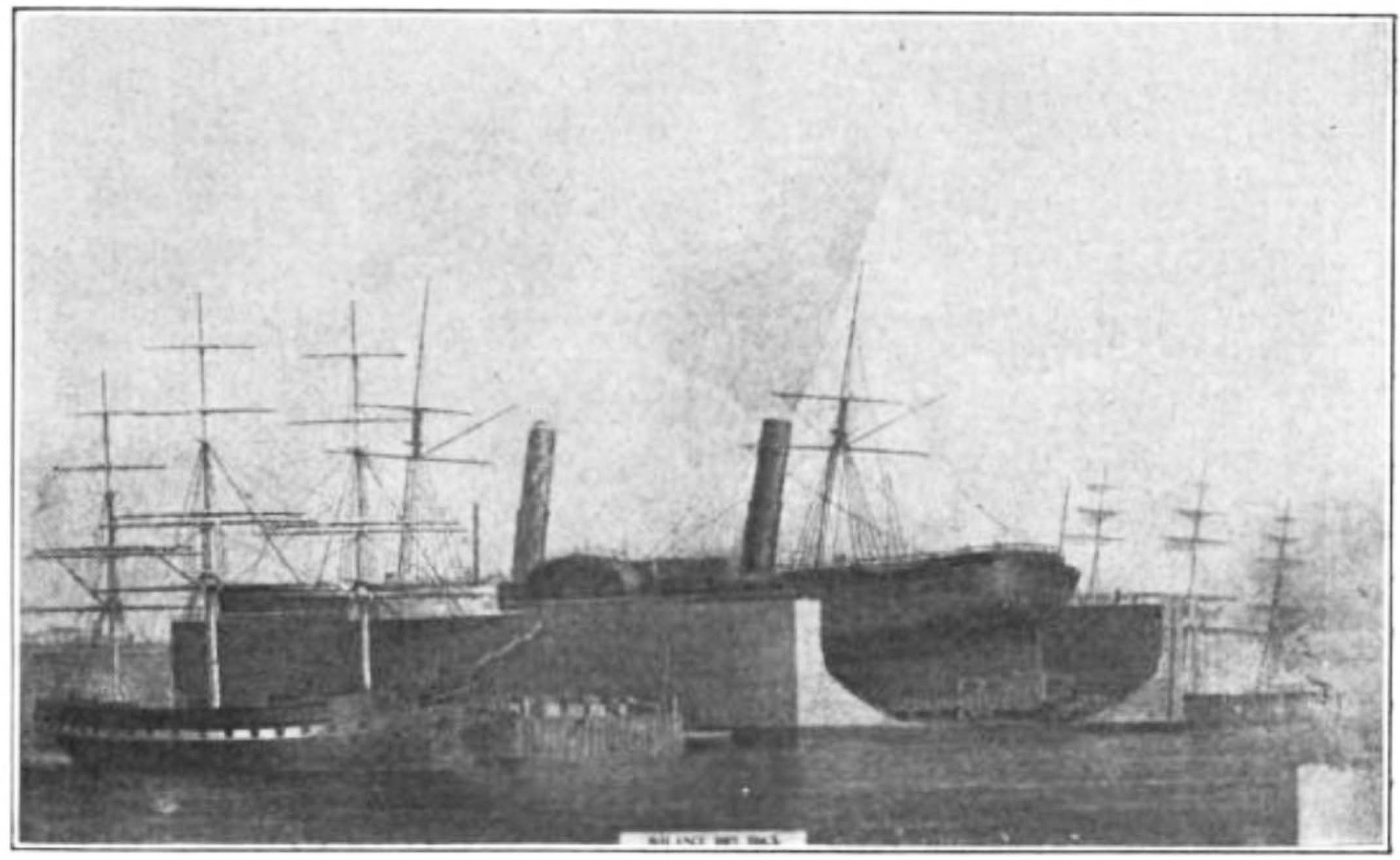
The Great Balance Dock with Adriatic aboard, perhaps for installation of her initial copper bottom in 1856

Adriatic's machinery was massive, and massively troubled, delaying her completion and raising her cost. She was propelled by two side-mounted paddlewheels 40 feet (12 m) in diameter and 12 feet (3.7 m) in width. The two iron shafts which drove her paddlewheels were produced by the Reading Steam Forge. Their rough initial weight was 80,000 pounds (36,000 kg) each, and after finishing on the lathe weighed 66,000 pounds (30,000 kg). The shafts were turned by two oscillating steam engines, the largest ever built at the time. Each engine had a cylinder that was 100 inches (2.5 m) in diameter, and a piston that had a stroke of 12 feet (3.7 m). Eight boilers produced steam for the engines. The ship's machinery was built by the Novelty Iron Works of New York.

Adriatic was intended to provide cutting edge performance, and consequently her mechanical systems pushed the limits of conventional steam technology. Several aspects of her technology had never operated at her scale, and some were altogether new. Of particular note, the original steam and exhaust valves designed by Horatio Allen, failed and were replaced by more conventional technology. The original condensers failed, both because they could not expand sufficiently when heated and because the rubber packing in them broke down. It took until November 1857, more than a year and a half after her launch, before the ship was ready for her maiden voyage.

Her uppermost deck was called the "hurricane deck". This was essentially the roof of the long deckhouse that ran most of the length of the ship. The forward and aft wheelhouses were on this deck. Officer's staterooms were situated between the two smokestacks. Skylights on this deck illuminated the saloons and machinery spaces below. The ship's laundry was also situated in this area to take advantage of the hot air rising from the engines.

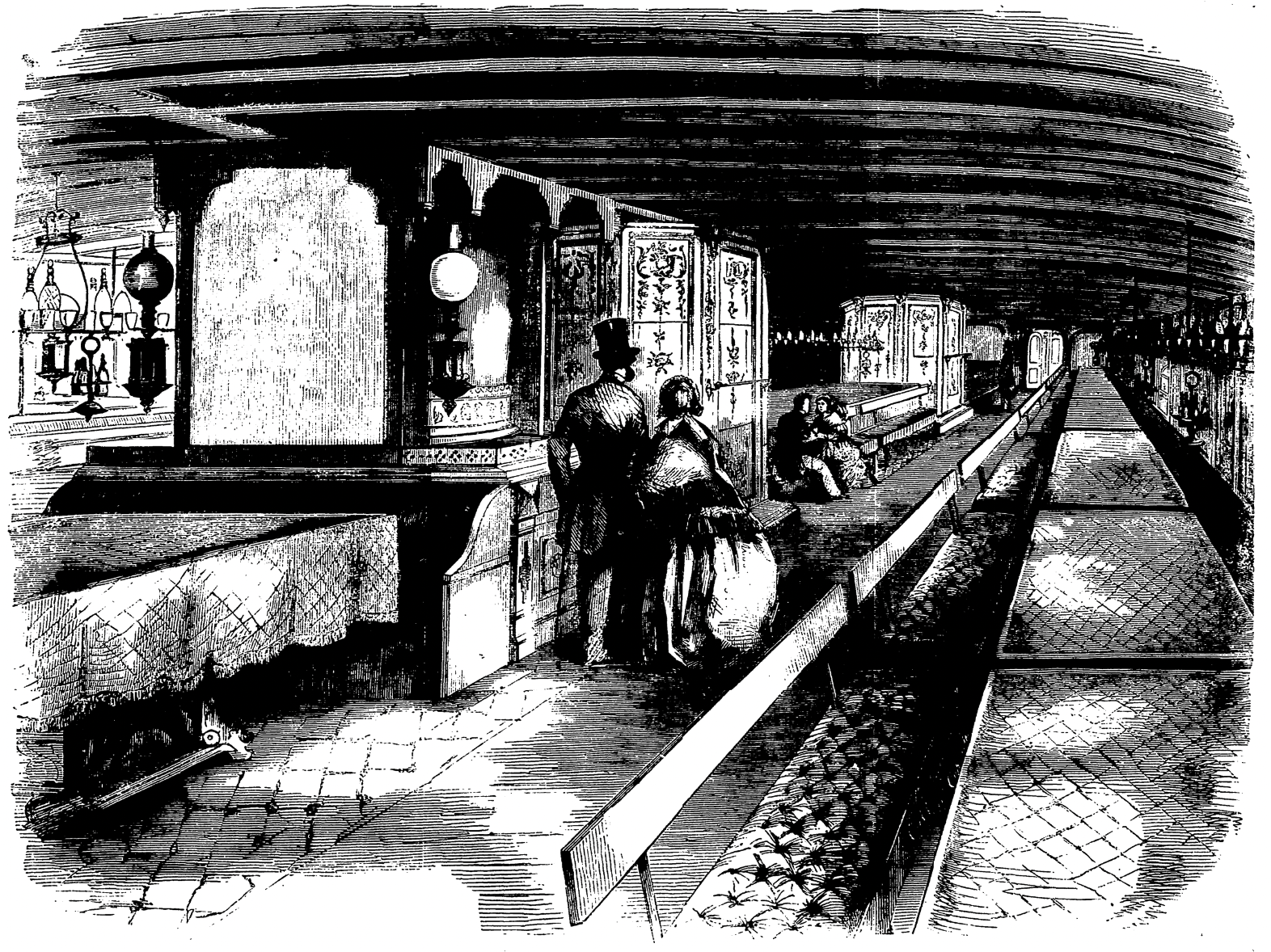
The grand dining saloon aboard Adriatic in 1857

The house on the "spar deck" contained the grand dining saloon, which was 75 feet (23 m) long and 28 feet (8.5 m) wide. Two hundred people could be served at the same time. The saloon was lit with ports and skylights, each decorated with the image of a flying bird. Extending around the entire saloon were settees covered in crimson velvet. The saloon was paneled in oak, carved with figures of birds, fruits, and flowers. The dining tables were of oak as well. Large mirrors were placed on both ends of the saloon. Aft of the saloon was the stairway leading to the "main deck" below. Aft of the stairway was the smoking room, which was 25 feet (7.6 m) long and 18 feet (5.5 m) wide, and various storerooms. There was also a separate ladies saloon. Forward of the grand dining saloon was the galley and pantry. The ship had two icehouses which held 100 tons of ice to keep food cool. This area also contained the doctor's office and barbershop.

The main deck contained the first-class saloon. The saloon was paneled in allegorical paintings and mirrors. 130 first-class staterooms, which lined both sides of the ship, opened into the saloon through individual alcoves. The second-class saloon and staterooms were also on the main deck. The upholstery was green Morocco leather, a step down from the velvet in first class.

Cargo and crew quarters were below the main deck, and below that was the "orlop deck" where 1,500 tons of coal were stowed.

Adriatic could carry about 300 first-class passengers and 100 second-class. There was no provision for steerage passengers. To serve a maximum of 400 passengers, Adriatic carried a crew of 188.

The ship's ground tackle was entirely metallic. Her two anchors weighed 7,000 pounds (3,200 kg) each. They were attached to iron chains 2.5 inches (6.4 cm) in diameter and 600 feet (180 m) long.

Adriatic had two masts. She was rigged as a brig and could sail if her engines failed her.

Adriatic's first sea trial began on November 13, 1857. She steamed out of New York Harbor about 50 miles to the south and then returned to Sandy Hook where she anchored for the night. The next day she headed east into The Atlantic. She sailed around Block Island and returned to her berth at the Collins Line dock at the foot of Canal Street in the Hudson River. For the most part, her machinery operated well. At one point she achieved a speed just short of 18 knots, very fast for a major ship of her time.

== New York and Liverpool United States Mail Steamship Company (1857–1858) ==
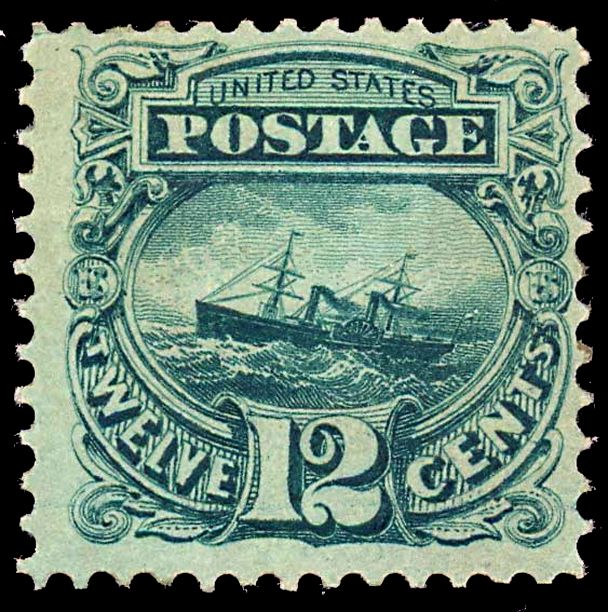
Adriatic was such a triumph of American shipbuilding that she was featured on an 1869 U.S. postage stamp

Adriatic left New York on her maiden voyage on November 23, 1857. Her departure was an embarrassment. On the way out of her berth, Adriatic collided with the tug William H. Webb, the Collins steamer Atlantic, and the dock she had just left. The three tugs deployed to assist could not control the Adriatic and a flood tide swept her a mile upriver before the ship headed out to sea. There were no significant injuries and only minor damage to the ships involved. This magnificent ship, which cost in excess of $1 million to build, carried but 38 passengers. The ship reached Liverpool after a fairly uneventful voyage on December 4, 1857, having completed the crossing in just over 10 days, a very respectable speed in that era. She returned to New York on December 21, 1857. She had sailed for the last time for the Collins Line that commissioned her.

The Collins Line suffered a number of setbacks after construction on Adriatic began. The steamer Pacific disappeared without a trace. In August 1856 Congress reduced the mail subsidy from $858,000 per year, back to its original $385,000. The surviving Collins ships, Atlantic and Baltic, were worked hard for less profit and then were withdrawn from service at intervals for repair. Slower less luxurious ships were chartered to take their place, damaging the Collins Line's reputation. Meanwhile, Adriatic sat idle while costs mounted on her balky engines. The Collins Line went bankrupt.

On April 1, 1858, Dudley B. Fuller, acting on behalf of the Brown brothers, was the sole bidder for Atlantic, Baltic, and Adriatic at a sheriff's auction. He bid only $50,000 which left various government and private creditors seeking recompense, mired in failed sale attempts and litigation for years.

== North Atlantic Steamship Company (1859–1861) ==
In 1859, the first trans-continental rail line was still a decade away. The fastest way to travel between the east and west coasts of the United States was to take a steamer from New York to Panama, take the Panama Railroad across the isthmus, and then take another steamer to San Francisco. Prior to 1859, the Pacific Mail Steamship Company served the west coast part of this route while the U.S. Mail Steamship Company served the east coast portion. Both lines depended on the subsidies from the U.S. Post Office for their profitability. When these contracts were due for renewal in 1859, the U.S. Mail Steamship Company chose to sell its assets and retire from the business. In response to losing its Atlantic partner, the Pacific Mail Steamship Company created the North Atlantic Steamship Company in conjunction with the Panama Railroad. The steamship company contributed $400,000 in cash, while the railroad contributed $500,000. The new company bought the three remaining Collins Line ships, including Adriatic, from the Brown brothers in 1859 for $900,000, half in cash and half in Pacific Mail Steamship Company stock. The main targets for this acquisition were Atlantic and Baltic, which were placed on the New York to Panama route.

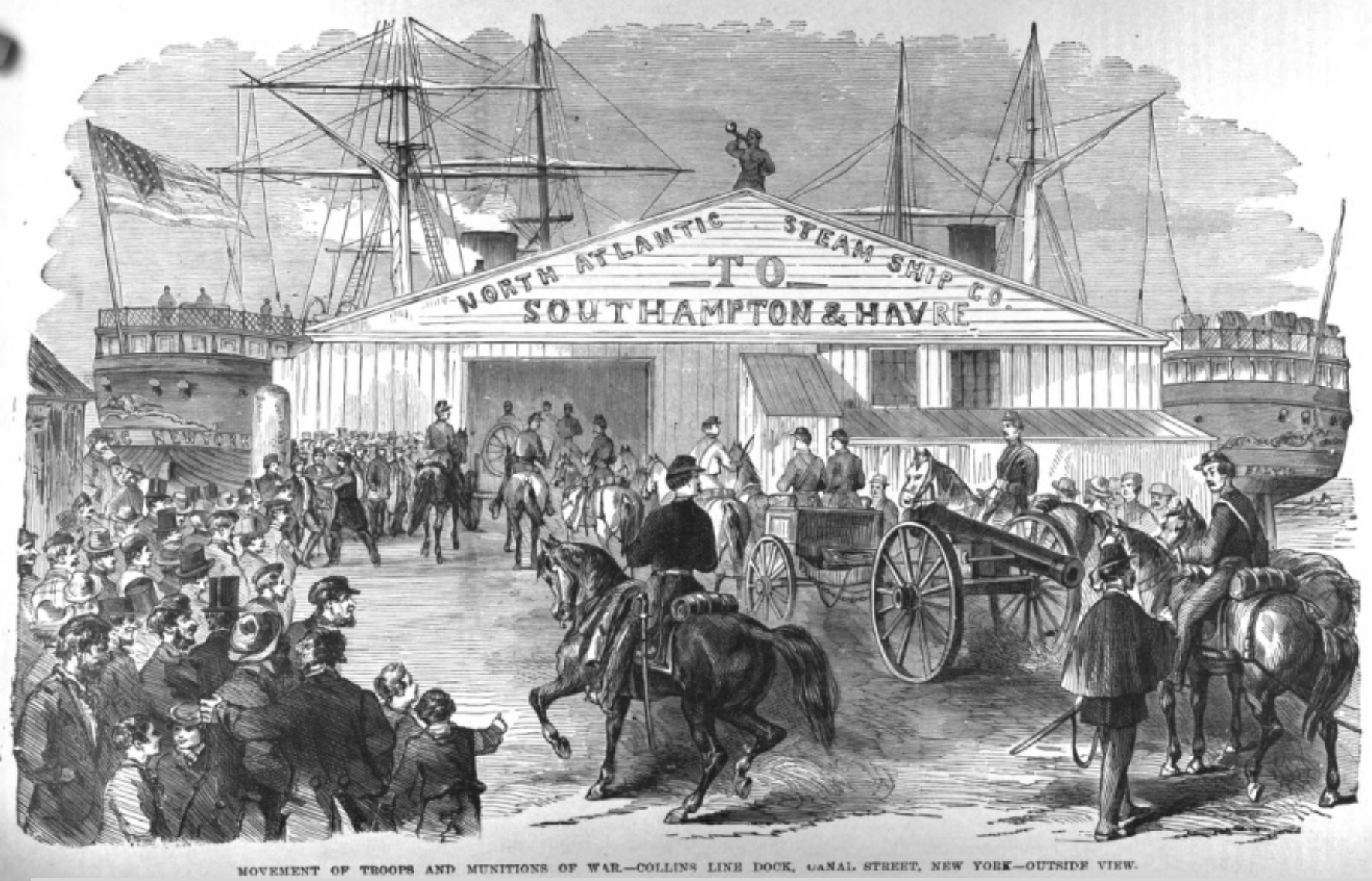
The North Atlantic Steamship Company's dock at the foot of Canal Street showing Adriatic's destinations.

Adriatic's new owners continued Collins' work to perfect the ship's machinery. Her steam and exhaust valves were replaced yet again, and more robust bearings were installed to support the massive paddle-shafts. The cost of these repairs was reported as $90,000. Sea trials in February 1860 with the new equipment proved successful, with the ship reaching 16 knots in rough seas. Thus repaired, Adriatic was once again placed in trans-Atlantic service. She sailed from New York on April 14, 1860 with 197 passengers aboard. She docked at Southampton on April 24, and then sailed on to Le Havre. She left France on May 8, stopped at Southampton again, and reached her berth on Manhattan on May 19, 1860. On her return journey she averaged just over 13 knots, and better still, did so without any of the mechanical failures which had plagued her. She sailed five trans-Atlantic round-trips in 1860, returning to her home port, before the North Atlantic became too stormy, on November 6, 1860. While Adriatic had a successful season, the trans-Atlantic trade was not the main business of her owner, and it was not clear how this single vessel could compete against Cunard and other large trans-Atlantic lines.

== Atlantic Royal Mail Steam Navigation Company (1861–1869) ==
The Atlantic Royal Mail Steam Navigation Company, know universally as the Galway Line, won a contract from the British government in 1859 to carry the mail from Liverpool to Galway, Ireland to St. John's, Newfoundland with connections on to Boston or New York. The Galway Line's ships repeatedly failed to live up to the terms of the company's mail contract both in terms of the number and speed of its sailings. Several were damaged or lost in the stormy North Atlantic, including the line's flagship, Connaught. The Galway Line needed a fast, trans-Atlantic capable ship quickly. In February 1861, it bought Adriatic for $437,500. She was registered with British Registrar of Shipping on April 19, 1861, and assigned official number 29762 and signal code Q.H.B.D.

She sailed from New York for the last time under an American flag on March 13, 1861 for Southampton, and Le Havre, returning to Southampton instead of New York. There she was drydocked, had her bottom re-coppered, and large steerage quarters installed. She sailed from Galway on her maiden voyage for her new line on April 23, 1861, reaching St. John's on the 29th and New York on May 2, 1861. Her second trip was even faster; Adriatic was the first passenger line to cross The Atlantic in less than nine days. The rest of the line did not perform as well, and the company lost its mail contract. The Galway Line suspended service for two years.

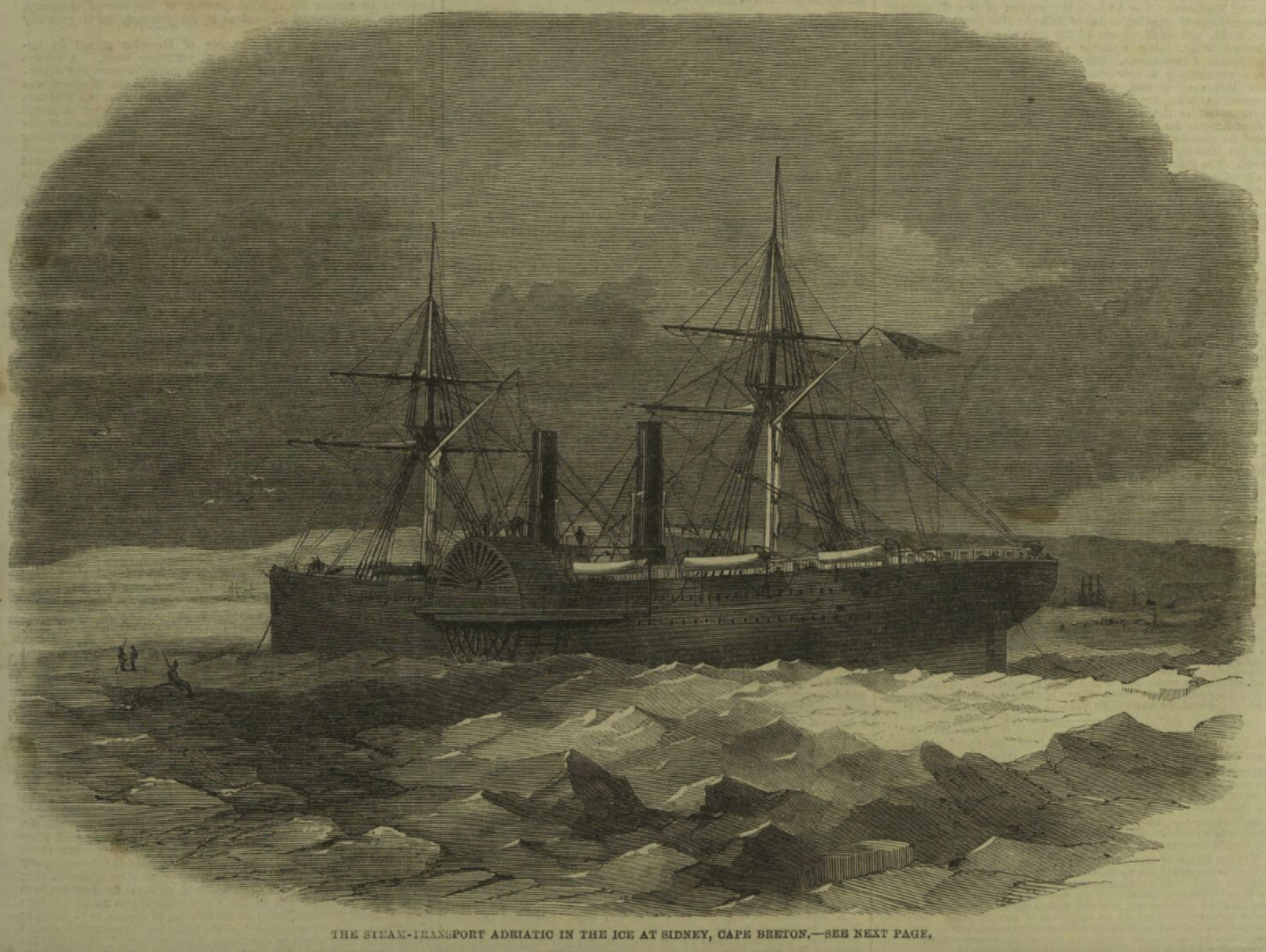
Adriatic iced in at Cape Bretton Island in 1862

=== Admiralty Service ===
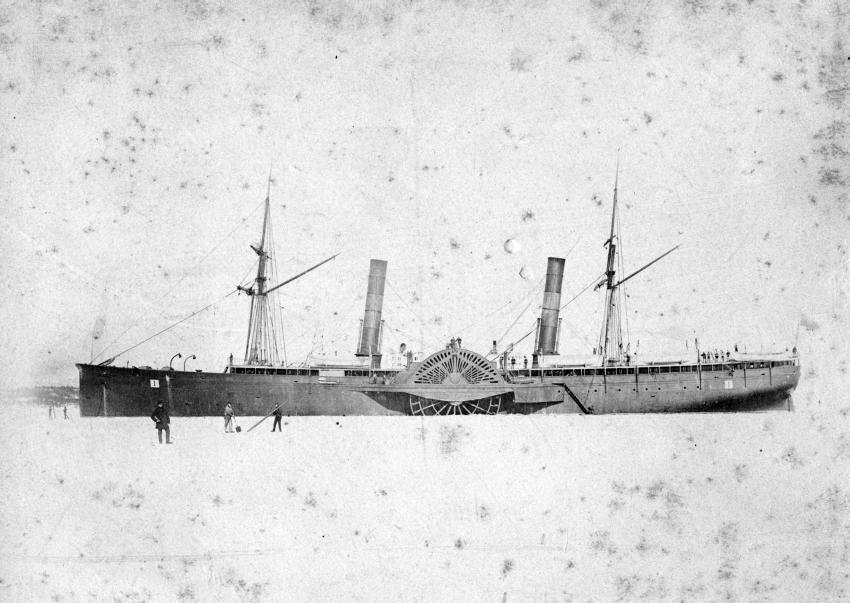
SS Adriatic stuck in the ice in North Sydney harbor in March 1862. This is one of the only existing photographs of any Collins liner.

While the Galway Line was inactive, Adriatic was chartered by the British Admiralty. The Trent Affair reflected diplomatic tensions between the Union and British Government at the time, and there was concern that the American Civil War could spread north and threaten the British Colonies. Adriatic brought 820 men of the Grenadier Guards Regiment, and 460 men of the Military Train to Halifax in December 1861 to reinforce Canada. On her return voyage, the ship was trapped in the sea ice at Cape Bretton Island, and spent the winter of 1861–62 frozen in at Sydney. With the Spring thaw, she returned to Halifax in April 1862. As tensions with the Union had subsided, Adriatic returned to England with troops of the 96th Regiment of Foot.

=== Galway Line Service ===
After two years of spirited lobbying, the Galway Line regained a mail contract and recommenced its trans-Atlantic service. The Royal Mail Steamer Adriatic, arrived back in Galway on September 1, 1863, ready to sail for New York again. The ship made two more round trips, finally arriving back in Liverpool on January 29, 1864 having been damaged by ice on her trip back to Europe. She was taken to the Canada Dock in Liverpool for repairs. Her company's problems were not so easily repaired, however, and the Galway Line suspended its service for the last time in March 1864. Adriatic sat idle in Southampton for nearly five years until she was purchased by Sir Edward Bates in September 1869.

== Bates and Company (1869–1873) ==
Bates and Company was a Liverpool-based shipping firm which ran a number of cargo ships to India. It was reported that Bates planned to convert Adriatic into a sailing ship, ridding her of the expense of bulky machinery and tons of coal, and use her to transport up to 20,000 bales of East India cotton back to Britain. The tug Cruiser was sent to tow her from Southampton to Liverpool where the modifications were to take place. Her engines were removed and she was given three masts, but it was not until October 1871 that she sailed from Liverpool. It was not cotton, but coal which became her cargo. She left Liverpool with 3,800 tons of coal aboard. It is not clear that she sailed for Bates, who could have put her into East India service quickly if so inclined. She does not appear in Lloyd's Register in 1871 and does not reappear until 1874, where her owner is listed as the African Steam Ship Company.

== African Steam Ship Company (1873–1885) ==
The African Steam Ship Company was a British shipping line which was focused on trade in West Africa and the Niger Delta particularly. It bought Adriatic no later than 1873, but conceivably may have owned the ship when she left Liverpool in 1871. She was a hulk, permanently anchored in the river, used to store coal and as living quarters at Bonny, Nigeria. In 1885 the hull was leaking so badly that she was beached for inspection and found to be infested with shipworms. Adriatic was abandoned as irreparable.
