= SUA =

Sua or SUA may refer to:

== Name ==
- Sua, common name for the Dalbergia tonkinensis tree
- Sua, a performance style of tautoga (dance), see Tautoga#Sua
- Sua Pan, a large natural topographic depression within the Makgadikgadi region of Botswana
- Sua people, an ethnic group of Aka pygmies in the Congo
- Sua language, a Mel language of Guinea-Bissau
- Sué, also spelled as Suá; god of the Sun of the Muisca
- Sova, Iran, aka "Sua", a village in Mazandaran Province, Iran
- Seilala Sua (born 1978), American discus thrower
- Sua Rimoni Ah Chong (21st century), Samoan politician
- Stage name of Kim Bo-ra (born 1994), member of K-Pop girl group Dreamcatcher.
- Stage name of Yoo Soo-ah, member of K-Pop girl group CSR.

== Acronym ==
- Soka University of America, a liberal arts college in Aliso Viejo, California
- Seamen's Union of Australia, a former trade union for Australian merchant seamen
- SCCP User Adaptation, a member of the SIGTRAN family of protocols
- Single umbilical artery
- Sokoine University of Agriculture, Tanzania
- Special use airspace, in aviation
- Sporting Union Agenais, a French rugby union club based in Agen, France
- St. Ursula Academy (Toledo, Ohio), an all-girls high school in Toledo, Ohio
- St. Ursula Academy (Cincinnati, Ohio), an all-girls high school in Cincinnati, Ohio
- Subsystem for UNIX-based Applications, also known as Interix, a POSIX and Unix environment subsystem for the Windows NT operating systems
- Sudden unintended acceleration
- Convention for the Suppression of Unlawful Acts against the Safety of Maritime Navigation, often abbreviated "SUA"
- Single-unit activity, a type of single-unit recording in neuroscience
- Witham Field, Florida, IATA airport abbreviation SUA
- Suicide attempt
- A software usage agreement, similar to an EULA

== See also ==
- SUAS (disambiguation)
- Chrysophyllum cainito, a tree known as Vú Sữa in Vietnam, occasionally conflated with Dalbergia tonkinensis, see above
- Protocol for the Suppression of Unlawful Acts against the Safety of Fixed Platforms Located on the Continental Shelf (SUA PROT)
