= Irish trade mark law =

Irish trade mark law protects trade marks in the Republic of Ireland. It is provided for in national legislation such as the Trade Marks Act, 1996 and the Intellectual Property Act, 2014, as well as European Union law.

== Definition ==
According to §6 of the Trade Marks Act, 1996, a trade mark may be defined as "any sign capable of being represented graphically which is capable of distinguishing goods or services of one undertaking from those of other undertakings", consisting in particular "of words (including personal names), designs, letters, numerals or the shape of goods or of their packaging."

== Trade mark registration ==
Trade marks are registered with the Intellectual Property Office of Ireland. Trade marks are registered for a period of ten years and may afterwards be renewed an indefinite number of times with the payment of a fee.

Registration grants the proprietor exclusive rights over the trade mark §13 of the Trade Marks Act, 1996 from the date of registration.

== Legislation ==
The Trade Marks Act, 1996 was preceded by the Trade Marks Act, 1963, and was intended to replace the Act of 1963 in compliance with EU Council Directive No. 89/104/EEC to harmonize copyright laws. The Act of 1996 was signed into law in July 1996.

The Act of 1996 was amended in 2019 as EU Trade Marks Directive 2015 was transposed into Irish law.

Several international treaties governing trade mark law are in effect in the Republic of Ireland, including the Paris Convention for the Protection of Industrial Property (1883), the International (Nice) Classification of Goods and Services (1957), the Trademark Law Treaty (1994), the TRIPS Agreement (1995), the Madrid Protocol (1996), and the Singapore Treaty on the Law of Trademarks (2006).

== See also ==
- Trade mark law of the European Union
- Copyright law of Ireland
