= The Galway Line =

The Atlantic Steam Navigation Company (colloquially known as The Galway Line) was a transatlantic shipping company operating out of Galway City between the years 1858 and 1864. It had seventeen steam-powered ships supplemented with auxiliary sails. Mechanical propulsion was by means of either paddle wheel or propeller.

== Ships ==
- SS Indian Empire
- SS Antelope
- SS Prince Albert
- SS Propeller
- SS Pacific
- SS Circassian
- SS Adelaide
- SS Argo
- SS Jason
- SS Brazil
- SS Golden Fleece
- SS Panama
- SS Connaught
- SS Columbia
- SS Adriatic
- SS Hibernia
- SS Anglia
