= Great Balance Dock =

Floating dry dock

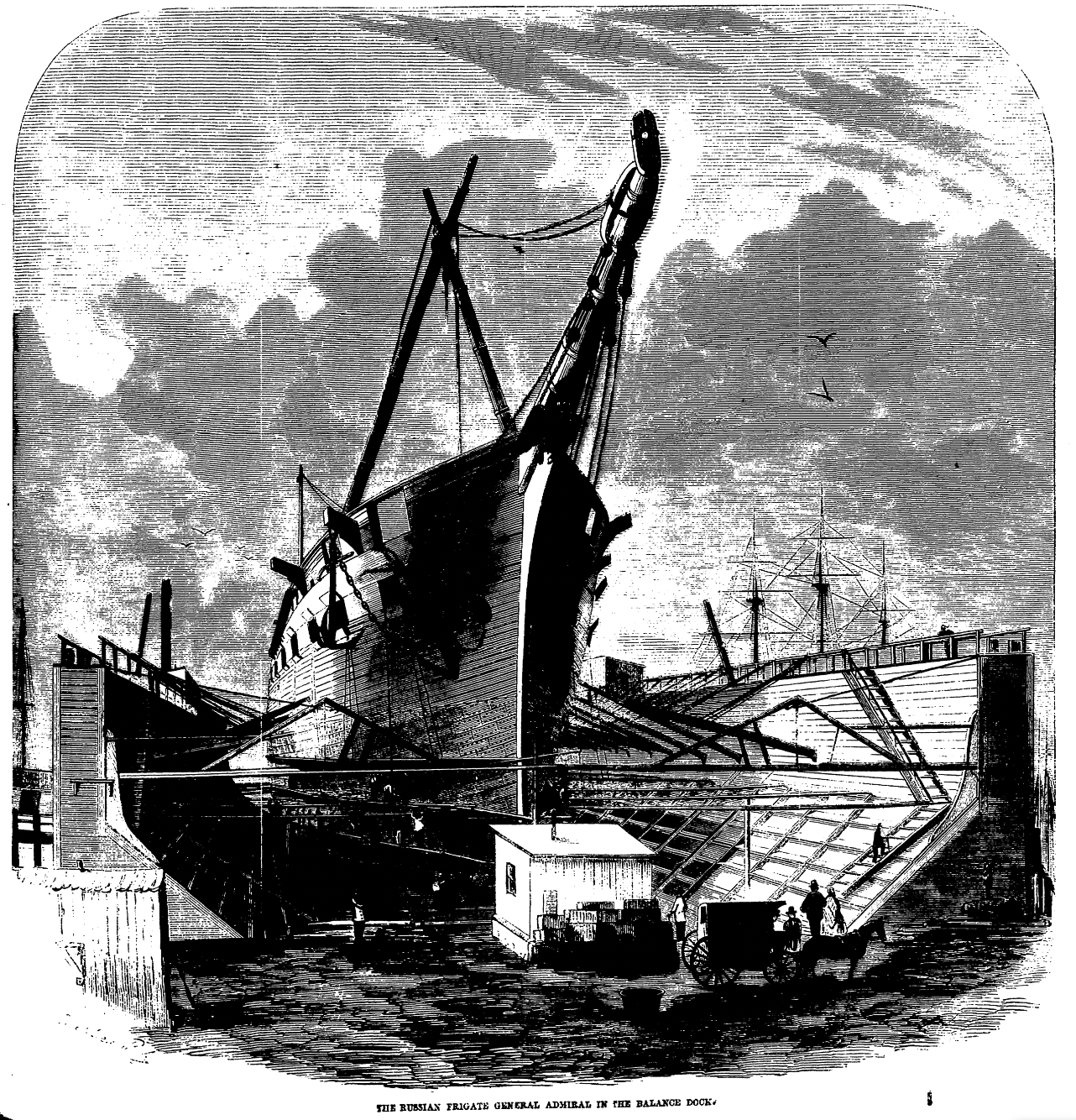
- The Great Balance Dock with the Russian frigate General Admiral aboard in 1858

United States
- Name: Great Balance Dock
- Owner: New York Balance Dock Company
- Builder: William H. Webb, New York
- Launched: September 30, 1854

General characteristics
- Length: 325 ft (99 m)
- Beam: 99 ft (30 m)
- Capacity: 8,000 tons

The Great Balance Dock was a floating drydock in New York City. It was the largest such facility in the world when constructed in 1854, and consequently, many of the most important ships of its time were serviced there.

== Construction and Characteristics ==
The underwater portions of ship's hulls require periodic maintenance. This includes removing marine growth from the hull, and repairing rudders. For the wooden ships of the nineteenth century, hull maintenance included caulking between hull planks, and nailing thin copper sheets to the bottom to discourage marine growth and wood-boring marine worms. Propeller-driven vessels required work on the propellers themselves and the associated bearings, shafts, and stuffing boxes. Hulls damaged in storms, collisions, groundings, or by the action of worms or rot also needed work below their waterlines.

It has always been difficult to access the underwater portions of a ship's hull. From earliest times this was achieved by careening. To careen a ship, it was grounded on a steep beach at high tide. As the tide ebbed, the hull would be exposed so that work could be done. Careening has numerous disadvantages not the least of which is that work is interrupted after only a few hours by the return of the tide. Graving docks are an ancient alternative to careening. A basin was dug into the shoreline, lined with stone, and sealed with water-tight gates. Ships would float into the dock with the gates open. Once the gates were closed, the water in the dock could be pumped out, setting the ship on the dry bottom of the dock. Graving docks are costly, difficult to build, and require significant amounts of shoreline real estate. As ships reached 300 feet (91 m) and longer in the mid-nineteenth century, the investment required to build such a dock became prohibitive.

In 1840 John S. Gilbert patented a new form of floating drydock. The New York Balance Dock Company was incorporated on April 18, 1848, to build such docks. In 1853, the company commissioned William H. Webb to build the Great Balance Dock at what was estimated to be a cost of $150,000. She was launched at his Williamsburg, Brooklyn shipyard on September 30, 1854. The dock's pumping machinery was installed by Mott & Ayres after she was launched. She was sufficiently large to handle the largest ships in existence at the time.

The Great Balance Dock was built of wood planking and timbers. She was 325 feet (99 m) long, 99 feet (30 m) in breadth, and 38.5 feet (11.7 m) in height. The dock contained 12 water-tight compartments, which could be flooded to lower the dock sufficiently for a vessel to enter it, and could be pumped out to lift a vessel free of the water. Each compartment had its own pump. The pumps were driven by two steam engines, each of which produced about 300 horsepower. The pumps could move 3,500,000 US gallons (13,000,000 L) per hour, so ships could be lifted quickly. The dock had a lifting capacity of 8,000 tons.

The name of the dock was descriptive. In order to maintain a horizontal orientation as ships were hauled out, different amounts of water were maintained in her 12 tanks to balance the uneven load of the captive ship.

== Operation ==
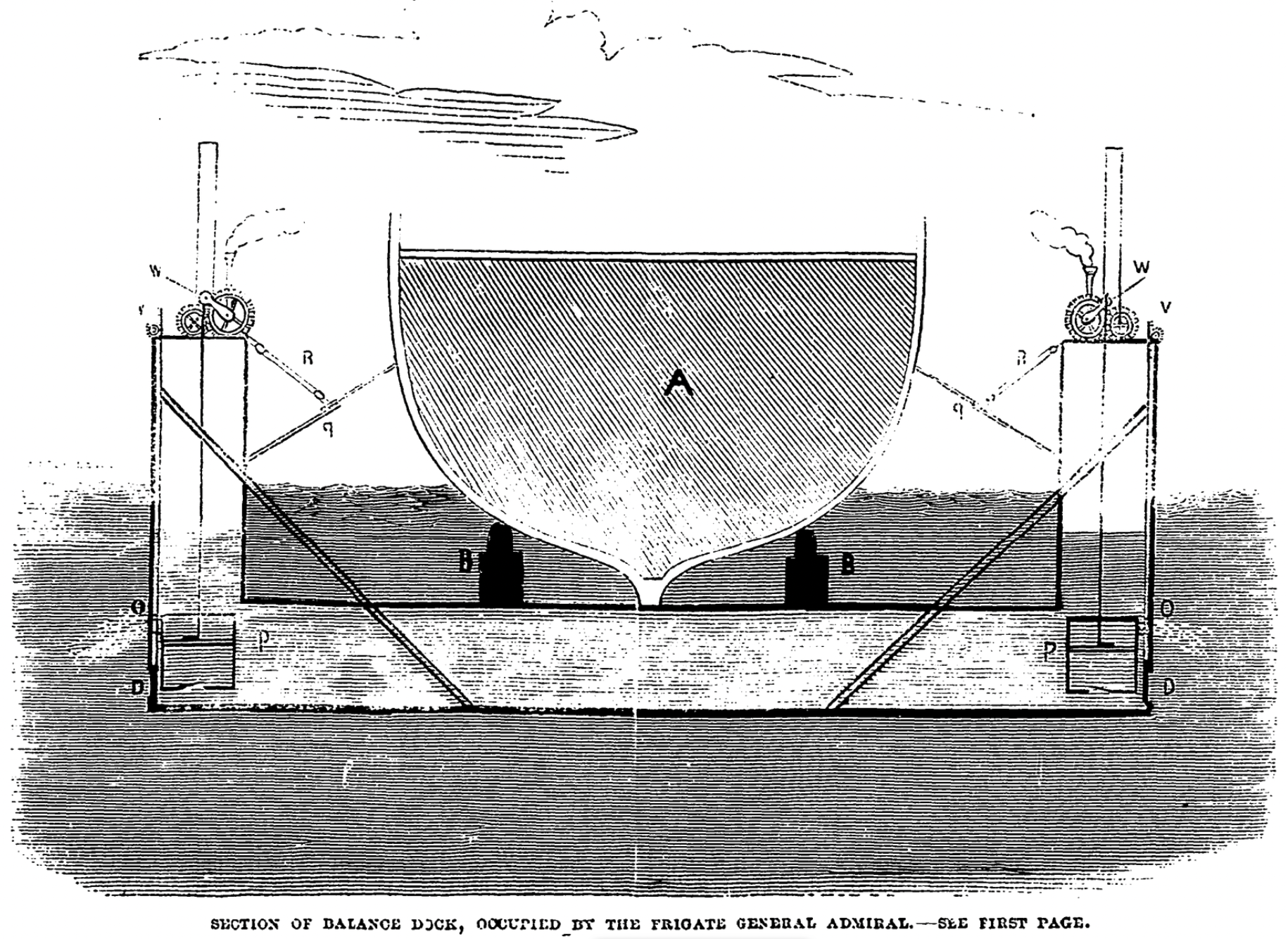
A simplified sectional view of the Great Balance Dock.

To prepare for hauling a ship, a series of hull blocks were placed in the bottom of the Great Balance Dock, labeled "B" in the sectional diagram. The purpose of these blocks was to distribute the weight of the ship somewhat more evenly than having it all sit on the ship's keel, and also to keep the ship upright in the dock. Once the blocks were set, the dock would submerge to the required depth by opening the external doors, labeled "D". The doors were opened by means of winches, "V", mounted on the top of the dock. Once submerged, the ship requiring maintenance could be towed into position and secured with lines tied to the dock's sides.

The two steam engines, one on each side of the dock, powered the pumps, "P", to expel the water in the tanks through the openings at "O". Once the ship was sitting on the hull blocks rather than floating, block and tackle would be used to lower poles, "Q", against the hull to assist in keeping the ship upright.

To refloat the vessel was a simple matter of winching up the poles and opening the doors to flood the dock again.

== Operating history ==
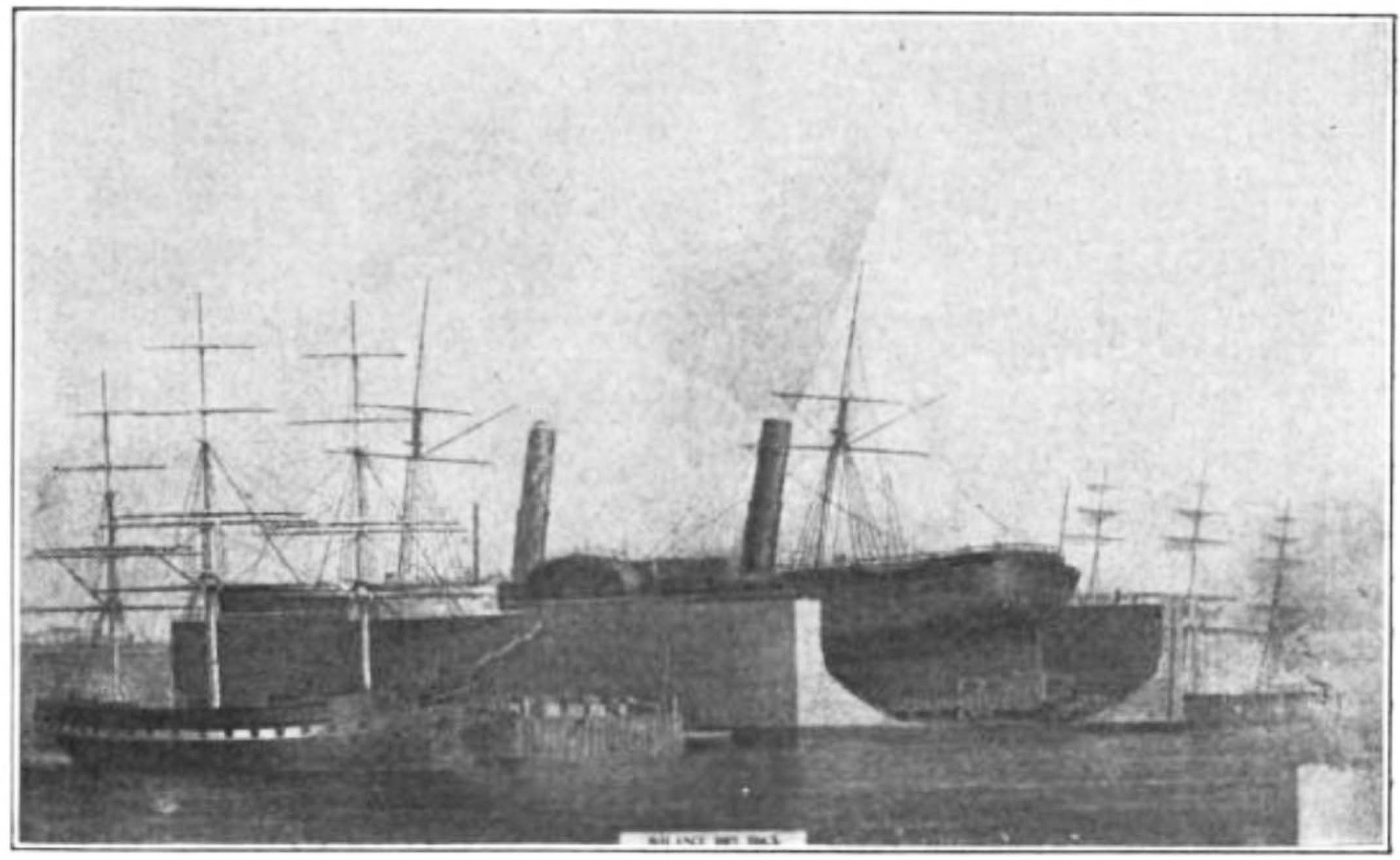
The Great Balance Dock with the steamship Adriatic aboard, c. 1860

In 1855 the dock was moored in the East River at the foot of Market Street. Local businesses objected to the loss of wharfage for goods-bearing ships and petitioned to have her moved. By 1857 she had been relocated north along the river to the foot of Pike Street. She remained there until at least December 1872. The Great Balance Dock was relocated to the Hoboken, New Jersey waterfront in January 1873. She was moved again in July 1873 to make way for the construction of new piers for the Hamburg American Line. The dock was returned to her previous location at the foot of Pike Street. The last newspaper report of the Great Balance Dock was in 1876. Her ultimate fate is unknown.

The dock was an integral tool for ship construction, particularly for installing the initial sheathing of copper to protect the hull. The dock also serviced a steady stream of vessels of all types for routine work on their hulls. The dock was a busy place. Newspapers of the day documented thirty different ships which were hauled out in 1859 alone.

In 1873, the fee for use of the Great Balance Dock was $0.25 per ton of displacement of the vessel, plus $0.15 per ton for every day the vessel was under repair in the dock.

Ships serviced aboard the Great Balance Dock in 1859
Ship	Type	Service
Arago	Steamship	
Australia		Scraping, caulking, and new copper
Baltic	Steamship	Examination of the bottom
Bell		Examination of the bottom
Belle Wood		Examination of the bottom
Bremen	Steamship	Scraping and painting
Columbia	Steamship	Examination of the bottom
David Crockett	Saling ship	Scraping, caulking, and new copper
Fulton	Steamship	
Harmonia	Steamship	Scraping and painting
Huntsville	Steamship	Caulking
Isaac Bell		Examination of the bottom
John Bright	Sailing ship	Scraping, caulking, and new copper
John Cottle		Scraping, caulking, and new copper
Lucy Thompson	Sailing ship	Scraping, caulking, and new copper
Neptune's Car		Scraping, caulking, and new copper
New York	Propeller steamship	Scraping and painting
New World	Steamship	
North Star	Steamship	New hull frames, strakes, keel section
Ocean Bird	Steamship	New knees, garboard strakes, caulking, and copper
Ocean Traveller		Scraping, caulking, and new copper
Oregon	Steamboat	Examination of the bottom
Peibo	Steamship	Initial installation of copper bottom
Sebastian Cabot		Scraping, caulking, and new copper
Switzerland		Scraping, caulking, and new copper
Sword Fish		Scraping, caulking, and new copper
Tornado	Clipper ship	Scraping, caulking, and new copper
Viking	Clipper ship	Scraping, caulking, and new copper
West Wind		Scraping, caulking, and new copper
William Nelson		Scraping, caulking, and new copper
