= Intellectual Property Office of Ireland =

Irish State agency

- Oifig Maoine Intleachtúla na hÉireann

Statutory office overview
- Jurisdiction: Government of Ireland
- Headquarters: Hebron Road, Kilkenny
- Statutory office executive: James Kelly, Controller
- Parent department: Department of Enterprise, Tourism and Employment
- Website: ipoi.gov.ie

The Intellectual Property Office of Ireland (IPOI) (Irish: Oifig Maoine Intleachtúla na hÉireann), successor to the Patents Office, is the government body responsible for administration and enforcement of intellectual property law in Ireland. It is directly responsible for enforcing Irish trade mark law and Irish copyright law. It is under the patronage of the Department of Enterprise, Tourism and Employment of the Government of Ireland.

== History ==
The agency was formed after the establishment of the Irish Free State. It was formed by the Industrial and Commercial Property Protection Act, 1927. §5 of the Act of 1927 created the Industrial and Commercial Property Registration Office under the authority of a duly appointed Controller of Industrial and Commercial Property. The newly created agency was divided into a Patents Branch and a Designs and Trade Marks Branch.

The agency's operations were modernised in 1998 and it relocated from its original offices in Dublin into a new headquarters in Kilkenny. The agency was named the Patents Office until 2019, when it was renamed the Intellectual Property Office of Ireland.

== Operations ==
The agency handles applications and registrations for patents, trade marks, and industrial designs. It is under the control of the Controller of Intellectual Property. As of 2025, James Kelly is the Controller of the Intellectual Property Office of Ireland.

== See also ==
- Patent office
