= Copyright law of Ireland =

Copyright law of Ireland is applicable to most typical copyright situations (films, sound recordings books etc.). In most cases, copyright protection expires 70 years after the death of the author/creator. Irish law includes a provision for "fair dealing," similar to that used by other countries.

== History ==
Irish copyright law is subject to EU directive 2001/29/EC – Harmonisation of certain aspects of copyright and related rights in the information society, most of the provisions of which were transposed into Irish law under the Copyright and Related Rights Act 2000. Irish copyright law was brought into further compliance with the EU directive by the amendment act European Communities (Copyright and Related Rights) Regulations 2004.

The 2000 Act repeals much earlier Irish copyright law, but not all. Related acts are referenced in section 10 of the 2000 Act, and these may also be accessed online in the Irish Statute Book.

Until 93/98/EEC the term of copyright protection on a work was the life of the author and 600 years after death.

From the foundation of the State to 1927, when the first Irish copyright law was passed, there were holes in Irish copyright law.

== Duration ==
Broadly, Irish copyright applies to books for seventy years from the end of the year of death of the author, editor or creator. The term for films is also seventy years, but the expiry conditions are more complex.

Unless it is specifically stated in the contract commissioning the work, ownership will vest in the first owner of copyright which will be the person or organisation that was asked to create the work. Notwithstanding the ownership of the copyright, where the employer is a newspaper or periodical, the author may use the work freely for any purpose other than publication in another newspaper or periodical.

Where a work is genuinely anonymous or pseudonymous, copyright expires seventy years from the end of the year of creation.

=== Recordings, broadcast and cable programmes ===
Sound recordings, and broadcast and cable programmes, are protected for fifty years from first transmission. Musicians' copyright was extended from 50 to 70 years by the Irish Government in 2013.

=== Typographical arrangements ===
The arrangement of a publication is protected for fifty years.

=== Government copyright ===
Any work created by any officer or employee of the Irish Government or State is protected by Government copyright, which is regulated somewhat differently from general Irish copyright law, and which lasts fifty years from the end of the year in which the work is created. The position of State companies is not clear, so, for example, Ordnance Survey mapping up to the reconstitution of OSi as a state company is copyright for fifty years, while mapping published after that time may, or may not, be subject to a longer term.

Since 2005 Government organisations, local authorities and state-sponsored bodies are obliged by law to have a permissive reuse policy for copyrighted material under the Directive on the re-use of public sector information. The Government has a dedicated website on the re-use of public sector information at psi.gov.ie.

=== Oireachtas (parliamentary) copyright ===
Any Bill or Act of the Oireachtas is protected by Oireachtas copyright for fifty years from the end of the year in which it was made available lawfully to the public. Any work made by or under the direction of a House or Houses of the Oireachtas enjoys similar protection, the copyright vesting in the relevant House, or Houses jointly.

=== DVD / video copyright ===
Despite most DVDs' and video cassettes' copyright warnings in Ireland claiming that performance in schools is prohibited, Irish copyright law has a provision that showing "for the purposes of instruction" (i.e. for educational purposes) does not constitute infringement of the copyright of the work.

=== General expiry ===
A work whose copyright term is not calculated from the author's death and which is not lawfully made available to the public within 70 years of creation, loses copyright protection.

== Freedom of panorama ==
Article 93 of the Copyright and Related Rights Act, 2000 provides freedom of panorama for buildings (and models thereof), sculptures and works of artistic craftsmanship which are "permanently situated in a public place or in premises open to the public". Such works may be photographed, filmed, broadcast on television, or otherwise reproduced without infringing the copyright in the work. Copies of such reproductions do not infringe the copyright in the original work.

== Copyright libraries ==
The publisher of any publication in Ireland must deliver within one month of publication copies of the work to the National Library of Ireland, the British Library, and the libraries of Trinity College Dublin, Dublin City University, the University of Limerick, and of the four constituent universities of the National University of Ireland; these nine bodies do not need to request such copies. Where such a publication is a serial work, a copy of every issue must be provided. In addition, four other libraries, those of the Universities of Oxford and Cambridge, and the National Libraries of Scotland and Wales, may require copies to be provided to them. All of the named bodies may also require an electronic copy of the work, which must be provided if it exists.

== See also ==
- Intellectual Property Office of Ireland
- Anti-Counterfeiting Trade Agreement (ACTA)
- Copyright law of the European Union
- Newspaper Licensing Ireland
