= SUAS (disambiguation) =

SUAS is the Southampton University Air Squadron, an organisation affiliated with the University of Southampton.

SUAS or Suas may also refer to:

- Small unmanned aircraft system (SUAS or sUAS), a form of unmanned aerial vehicle
- Suas (see), an ancient Roman Catholic diocese in North Africa
- Suas Educational Development, an educational charity registered in Ireland
