= Nettlemas =

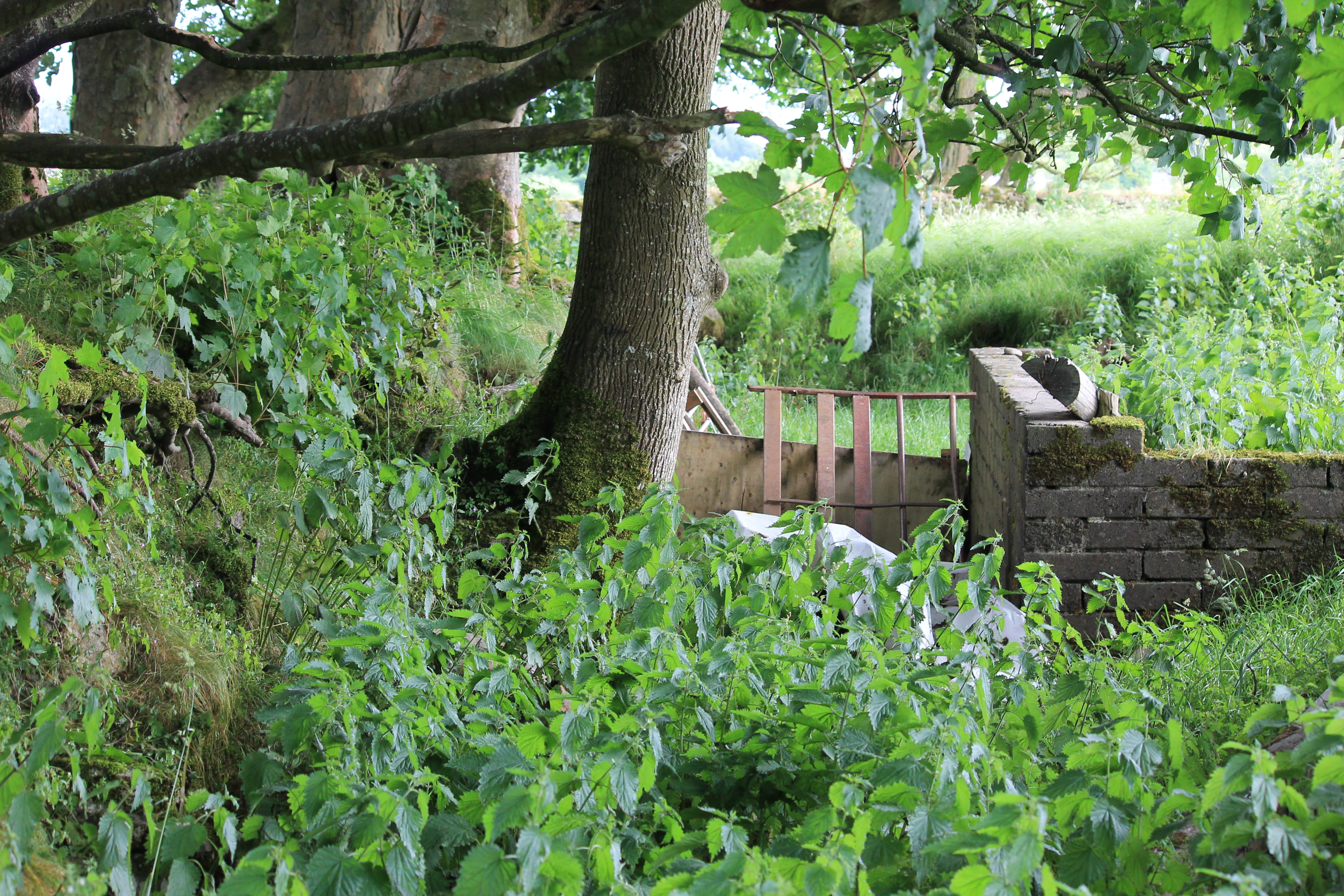
Nettles growing on disused land in County Wicklow in late June

Nettlemas is a former Irish custom previously associated with the first of May. The preceding day, 30 April, was called "Nettlemas night".

The custom is mentioned in Samuel Carter Hall's Ireland, Its Scenery, Character &c (1841), where it is described as "peculiar to Cork". Hall writes that, on Nettlemas night, boys in Cork walked in the streets stinging one another with nettles.

In Ireland's Wild Plants – Myths, Legends & Folklore (2017), author Niall Mac Coitir suggests that this folk custom was associated with "southern parts of County Cork" and compares it to a similar tradition, known as "Stinging Nettle Day", in South West England. Other sources describe similar customs in parts of Scotland, Devon and Cornwall.
