= Operation Innkeeper =

Cancelled WW2 German espionage plan

- Part of World War II
- Objective: To send two Irish Abwehr agents to London on a sabotage mission.
- Date: Autumn 1941
- Outcome: Aborted

Operation Innkeeper ("Unternehmen Gastwirt" in German) was an aborted plan devised in Autumn 1941 to send two Irish Abwehr agents to London on a sabotage mission.

One of the two agents was John Codd, an Irish national captured while serving in the British Army in 1940. While radio and sabotage training for Innkeeper did take place the plan was aborted due to the general collapse of German efforts to train and recruit suitable Irish agents as part of its Friesack Camp experiment.

== Bibliography ==
- Hull, Mark M. (2003). Irish Secrets. German Espionage in Wartime Ireland 1939-1945. ISBN 978-0-7165-2756-5.
- Stephan, Enno. (1963). Spies in Ireland. ISBN 1-131-82692-2. (Reprint).
- J Bowyer Bell. (1997, 3rd Edition). The Secret Army - The IRA. ISBN 1-85371-813-0.

== See also ==
- IRA Abwehr World War II - Main article on IRA Nazi links
- Friesack Camp
