= Last Light Ceremony =

Irish millennium celebration

The Last Light Ceremony took place all over the Republic of Ireland on the eve of the Millennium, 31 December 1999. In the weeks leading up to Millennium Eve, a special Millennium Candle was delivered to every household in the Republic with an accompanying scroll. At sunset, householders lit their candles to symbolically mark the last light of the second millennium. The first candle was lit on the east coast at Áras an Uachtaráin by the President of Ireland, Mary McAleese. The last candle was lit in County Cork on the west coast at 16:40, the last sunset of the millennium in Ireland.

The names of those present in each home were written on the accompanying scroll.
