= Softball in Ireland =

Softball in Ireland is governed by Softball Ireland, itself a member of the International Softball Federation. As of 2021, the Softball Ireland website noted that there were approximately 800 softball players and 40 teams in the country.

== History ==
The year 1982 marked the first softball league in Ireland, the Dublin Softball League. The Irish Softball Association was formed in 1989. It has been in various guises since then, including the Irish Baseball and Softball Association, the Irish Baseball and Softball Federation, back to the Irish Softball Association, and in recent years has been renamed Softball Ireland. Softball Ireland (SI) is the governing body of softball in Ireland. SI is responsible for the running of tournaments, leagues, development and international competition in both co-ed slowpitch and ladies fastpitch softball.

== Domestic competitions ==
Competition	2025	2024	2023	2022	2021	2020	2019	2018	2017	2016	2015	2014	2013	2012	2011	2010	2009	2008	2007	2006	2005	2004	2003	2002
Softball Ireland National Club Championships (SINCC)	Dodder Dynamoes (8)	Dodder Dynamoes (7)	Dodder Dynamoes (6)	Dodder Dynamoes (5)	BatPak (1)	Not Held	Dodder Dynamoes (4)	Dodder Dynamoes (3)	TNT (2)	Dodder Dynamoes (2)	TNT (1)	OddSox Green (2)	Keily's Kegs (1)	OddSox Green (1)	Dodder Dynamoes (1)	Inaugural Season								
Irish Open Softball Trophy	Sons of Pitches (1)	Belfast Softball Club (2)	Belfast Softball Club (1)	BatPak (4)	TNT (2)	Not Held	Dodder Dynamoes (5)	Limerick Originals (3)	TNT (1)	Dodder Dynamoes (4)	BatPak (3)	Dodder Dynamoes (3)	Dodder Dynamoes (2)	Limerick Originals (2)	Limerick Originals (1)	The Stingers UK (4)	The Stingers UK (3)	The Stingers UK (2)	Batpak (2)	Saints Stingers UK (1)	BatPak (1)	London Breakers UK (1)	OddSox Green (1)	Dodder Dynamoes (1)
Leinster League	Dodder Dynamoes (12)	Dodder Dynamoes (11)	Dodder Dynamoes (10)	Dodder Dynamoes (9)	BatPak (3)		Dodder Dynamoes (8)	Dodder Dynamoes (7)	TNT (2)	Dodder Dynamoes (6)	TNT (1)	OddSox Green (3)	Keily's Kegs (1)	OddSox Green (2)	Dodder Dynamoes (6)	OddSox Green (1)	BatPak (2)	BatPak (1)	Dodder Dynamoes (5)	Dodder Dynamoes (4)	Dodder Dynamoes (3)	Dodder Dynamoes (2)	Dodder Dynamoes (1)	Marlay Martyrs (1)
Ulster League	Brawlers (BSC) (11)	Brawlers (BSC) (10)	Brawlers (BSC) (9)	Brawlers (BSC) (8)	Cubs (1)	Brawlers (BSC) (7)	Brawlers (BSC) (6)	Brawlers (BSC) (5)	Brawlers (BSC) (4)	Brawlers (BSC) (3)	Sliders (3)	Brawlers (BSC) (2)	Brawlers (BSC) (1)	Sliders (2)	Sliders (1)	Smokin' Aces (BSC) (2)	Aviators (1)	Smokin' Aces (BSC) (1)	Inaugural Season					
Connacht Munster League	Galway Tribes (3)	Galway Tribes (2)	Galway Tribes (1)																					
Brian Walshe Cup	Dodder Dynamoes (5)	Dodder Dynamoes (4)	Kegs (2)	TNT (3)	Not Held	Not Held	Limerick Originals (1)	TNT (2)	TNT (1)	OddSox Green (4)	OddSox Green (3)	Kiely's Kegs (1)	BatPak (6)	Marlay Martyrs (1)	BatPak (5)	BatPak (4)	BatPak (3)	OddSox Green (2)	Batpak (2)	Dodder Dynamoes (3)	BatPak (1)	Dodder Dynamoes (2)	Dodder Dynamoes (1)	OddSox Green (1)
Intervarsity championships								Royal College of Suregeons Ireland (1)	University College Dublin (7)	University College Dublin (6)	University College Dublin (5)	University College Dublin (4)	University College Dublin (3)	University of Limerick (7)	University of Limerick (6)	University of Limerick (5)	University of Limerick (4)	University of Limerick (3)	University College Dublin (2)	University of Limerick (2)	University of Limerick (1)	University College Dublin (1)		

== National team ==
The national team has competed with varied success in recent years. The main competition being the European Softball Federation CoEd Slowpitch Championship. The event has been dominated by the Great Britain team winning all seven instalments. The venue for 2011 was Dupnitsa, Bulgaria. The record number of participants is eight at the 2010 event.

Position	2019 - Budapest (HUN)	2010 – Prague (CZE)	2008 – Southampton (GBR)	2006 – Ljubljana (SLO)	2004 – Linz (AUT)	2002 – Mladé Buky (CZE)	2000 – Dublin (IRL)	1998 – London (GBR)	
1st	Great Britain (United Kingdom)	Great Britain (United Kingdom)	Great Britain (United Kingdom)	Great Britain (United Kingdom)	Great Britain (United Kingdom)	Great Britain (United Kingdom)	Great Britain (United Kingdom)	Great Britain (United Kingdom)	
2nd	Germany	Czech Republic	Ireland (Republic of Ireland)	Czech Republic	Ireland (Republic of Ireland)	Ireland (Republic of Ireland)	Czech Republic	Czech Republic	
3rd	Ireland (Republic of Ireland)	Ireland (Republic of Ireland)	Czech Republic	Ireland (Republic of Ireland)	Czech Republic	Austria	Ireland (Republic of Ireland)	Ireland (Republic of Ireland)	
4th	Czech Republic	Guernsey	Jersey	Slovenia	Austria	Czech Republic	Guernsey	Guernsey	
5th	Netherlands	Belgium	Slovenia	Croatia	n/a	Germany	Germany	n/a	
6th	Belgium	Slovenia	n/a	n/a	n/a	Slovakia	n/a	n/a	
7th	Austria	n/a	Austria	n/a	n/a	n/a	n/a	n/a	n/a
8th	Bulgaria	n/a	Slovakia	n/a	n/a	n/a	n/a	n/a	n/a

== European Club Championship ==
2007 saw the inaugural European Cup Co-Ed Slowpitch Championship. The event was held in Limeil-Brévannes, France, from 19 September 2007 to 22 September 2007. There were five teams competing with Dodder Dynamoes representing Ireland. The London Chromies were crowned champions beating Dodder Dynamoes 10–3 in the Grand Final. The 2008 Championships, held in Dupnitsa, Bulgaria from 2 to 6 September, were won by Baker Tomkins of Britain beating Dodder Dynamoes 16–11 in the Grand Final. The 2009 Championship saw an increase in the participants to 7, with the event is again being held in Dupnitsa, Bulgaria from 26 to 29 August. 2009 winners, Dodder Dynamoes, became the first Irish team, club or national, to win an ESF sanctioned championship. The London Chromies reclaimed the title at the 2010 event held in Ljubljana, Slovenia.

Position	2018 – Riccione (ITA)	2010 – Ljubljana (SLO)	2009 – Dupnitsa (BUL)	2008 – Dupnitsa (BUL)	2007 – Limeil Brevannes (FRA)
1st	Pioneers (United Kingdom)	London Chromies (United Kingdom)	Dodder Dynamoes (Republic of Ireland)	Baker Tomkins (United Kingdom)	London Chromies (United Kingdom)
2nd	H2O (United Kingdom)	Dodder Dynamoes (Republic of Ireland)	Dragons (United Kingdom)	Dodder Dynamoes (Republic of Ireland)	Dodder Dynamoes (Republic of Ireland)
3rd	London Chromies (United Kingdom)	BatPak (Republic of Ireland)	ASKOE Linz Stamm Bandits (Austria)	ASKOE Linz Stamm Bandits (Austria)	Sparks BAK Mlade Buky (Czech Republic)
4th	Bandits Witches Linz (Austria)	Longbridge (Slovenia)	Sparks BAK Mlade Buky (Czech Republic)	Balkan Stars Sofia (Bulgaria)	ASKOE Linz Stamm Bandits (Austria)
5th	UCE Travellers (United Kingdom)	SBK Golovec (Slovenia)	Balkan Stars Sofia (Bulgaria)	N/A	Limeil Brevannes les Caribous (France)
6th	TNT (Republic of Ireland)	WBV Homerunners (Austria)	Baker Tomkins (United Kingdom)	N/A	N/A
7th	Mannheim Tornados (Germany)	N/A	Krpan LL Novo Mesto (Slovenia)	N/A	N/A

== See also ==
- Baseball in Ireland
