= Cliathairi =

Cliathairi were the professional "guards" around a king, who formed the backbone of an army in the Gaelic warfare of Medieval Ireland, having chosen military service as a career.
