= Financial services in the Republic of Ireland =

Financial services in Ireland refers to the services provided by the finance industry: banks, investment banks, insurance companies, credit card companies, consumer finance companies, government sponsored enterprises, and stock brokerages.

The market for the provision of financial services in Ireland is dominated by the two large banking groups Allied Irish Banks and Bank of Ireland. However competition from domestic, overseas and internet providers ensures consumer choice.

== Regulation ==
The regulator of financial services in Ireland is Central Bank of Ireland.

== Financial derivatives in Ireland ==
Ireland has a well developed market for financial derivatives, with its annual value being measured in $ billions. Most common are interest rate swaps and foreign exchange transactions used by businesses to manage their risk and support their currency requirements. Ireland's strong funds and insurance sectors are also significant users of derivatives, as are other special purpose vehicles located in the country such as securitisation structures. The majority of transactions involve the major banks and they in turn tend to enter into contracts with institutions outside Ireland, particularly in the EU. The Irish Stock Exchange also has the facility for exchange traded derivatives. Ireland's proximity to London, shared language and time zone is a benefit to its financial services industry. There is a depth of knowledge in Irish institutions and education establishments which supports the financial derivative industry.

Irish law is also conducive to financial derivatives trading. The ISDA Master Agreement is commonly used and the country is able to provide a 'clean' legal opinion to ISDA, meaning that there are no significant legal issues which arise if two parties wish to enter into financial derivative contracts. Non-Irish counterparties need to be sure that a counterparty has the specific power to trade financial derivatives: for example, if a company enters into a transaction outside of its objects in its memorandum and articles of association, the transaction may be void and unenforceable as ultra vires. Netting and set-off are fully enforcable in Ireland (see the Netting of Financial Contracts Act 1995). There are few decided cases relating to financial derivatives in the Irish courts but decisions in the courts of England and Wales would be of persuasive authority.

Regulation of the financial derivatives industry is the responsibility of the Central Bank. The central piece of legislation effecting the sale of financial derivatives is the Markets in Financial Instruments Directive 2004/39/EC which has been fully implemented into Irish law. The Market Abuse Directive 2003/6/EC is also fully implemented in Ireland and provides that insider dealing or market manipulation may be carried out using financial derivatives. In addition the Central Bank will regulate the use of derivatives through codes or guidance documents applying to specific financial services sectors – see for example, the UCITS and non-UCITS rules applying to funds.

The law in Ireland relating to financial derivatives transactions is generally clear and does not provide market participants with too many serious issues. The applicable law is formed by common law and certain key statutes. In addition, the financial regulation in Ireland, the Central Bank, has made a number of regulations which generally apply depending on the category of the party involved in derivative transactions. For example, rules relating to funds or to insurance companies will set down specific requirements that those entities have to adhere to. As such, international parties entering into transactions with Irish bodies will find that the requirements may vary depending on the kind of body with whom they are dealing. The common law in Ireland, since 1922, has developed independently of the United Kingdom but nonetheless UK decisions still carry weight in Irish courts and are regularly referred to in Irish judgments. As of 2012, there have been few significant decisions relating to financial derivatives made in the Irish courts, and as such reference can validly be made to the decisions of the UK and other common law jurisdictions.

Ireland has passed legislation in respect of the financial derivatives market. For instance, the Netting of Financial Contracts Act 1995 is a key piece of legislation to be complied with if parties to more than one financial derivative contract wish to net those contracts off against one another. This legislation was introduced as a result of perceived grey areas in the common law which prevented legal clarity. The European Markets in Financial Instruments Directive 2004/39(MIFID) has been in place in Ireland since 2007 and this is the central piece of regulation which would apply to those financial institutions that deal in financial derivatives with their customers. The market in exchange traded derivatives is not large but the Irish Stock Exchange has in place the infrastructure and rules which would allow financial derivatives to be listed and traded on its markets.

International counterparties need to be aware, however, of potential issues which could arise. For example, a contract entered into by a company ultra vires the powers set out in its memorandum and articles will be declared void. Although there have been attempts to remove this by statute and European legislation, the risk remains. The area is expected to be reformed, however.

== See also ==
- Credit Institutions (Financial Support) Act 2008
- An Post
- FEXCO
- Goodbody Stockbrokers
- Hibernian Aviva
- International Financial Services Centre
- Irish Enterprise Exchange
- Irish League of Credit Unions
- Irish Stock Exchange
- Laser (debit card)
- List of banks (Ireland)
- QUINN Financial Services
- RaboDirect
- Vhi Healthcare
