= Dublin Buddhist Centre =

Buddhist center in Dublin, Ireland

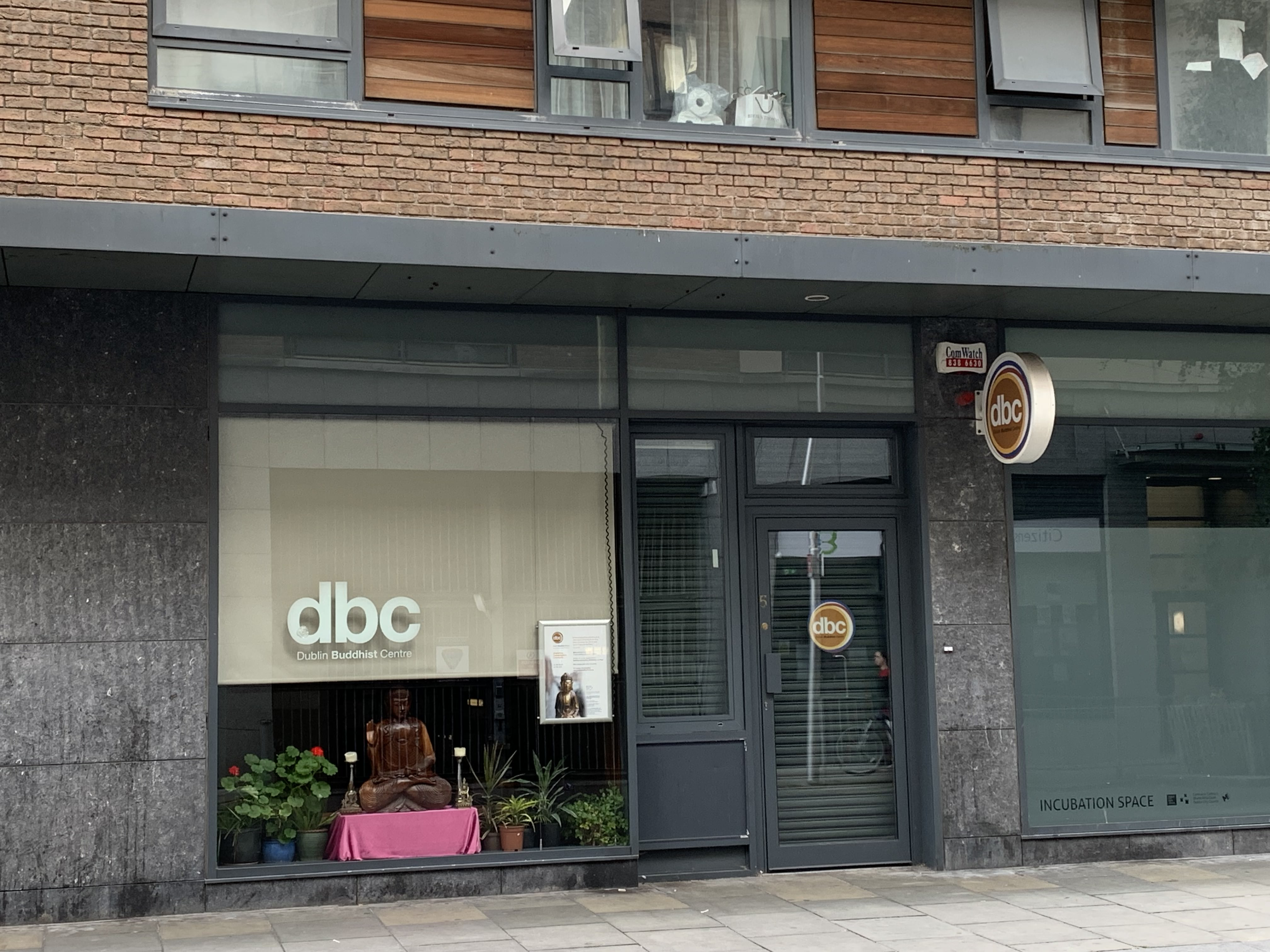
- Formation: 1992
- Location: Dublin, Ireland
- Website: dublinbuddhistcentre.org

The Dublin Buddhist Centre in Dublin, Ireland, was established in 1992. Classes were first held in a rented property on Raglan Road, Ballsbridge. In 1993 the Centre moved to a property on South Frederick Street, opposite Trinity College. In 1997 the Dublin Buddhist Centre moved again to another property in Temple Bar where it stayed until moving in 2002 to Leeson Street. In 2008 it moved to its current location of Liberty Corner, 5 James Joyce Street, Dublin 1.

The centre was originally called the Dublin Meditation Centre (DMC).
