= Irish Taxi Council =

The Irish Taxi Council is a union for full-time taxicab drivers in Ireland.

== Protests ==
During March 2010, members of the ITC staged protests over the number of taxi licences. Dublin's O'Connell Street was blockaded for several hours in October 2009 and March 2010
