= Suas Educational Development =

Irish charity organisation

Suas Educational Development is a registered charity in Ireland. The organisation, which has traded as STAND since 2024, aims to tackle educational disadvantage in India, Kenya and Ireland and has an ethos of youth development. Suas was founded by a group of students from Trinity College Dublin in 2002, and as of 2018 had a reported annual income of over €1.2m. Suas partners with several education NGOs in the developing world, in particular in India and Kenya, in order to provide education to underprivileged youth.

The charity's overseas programmes include 'Education for All', which is intended to provide support to education projects in India and Kenya. Schools in the program include several in Kolkata, in Nairobi, and in Mombasa.

The charity's activities within Ireland are coordinated via a network of college-based societies involved in volunteering and fundraising. A mentoring programme is also run for transition year and fifth year secondary students from disadvantaged areas in Dublin. The charity also runs literacy programs for younger children.
