= SS Connaught =

History

United Kingdom
- Name: Connaught
- Owner: Atlantic Royal Mail Steam Navigation Co, London
- Builder: Palmers Shipbuilding and Iron Company, Jarrow
- Yard number: 81
- Launched: 21 April 1860
- Completed: June 1860
- Maiden voyage: 25 September 1860
- Fate: Sunk in a storm on 8 October 1860. Wreck lies roughly 100 miles (160 km) off Boston at a depth of approximately 300 metres (980 ft).

General characteristics
- Tonnage: 2,959 grt
- Length: 110 metres (360 ft)
- Beam: 12.2 metres (40 ft)

The PS Connaught was a 380-foot-long (120 m) passenger sail and steamship which was built in 1860, and sank on its maiden cruise. It initially sailed from Galway, Ireland to St John's, Newfoundland, and thereafter sailed on to Boston, Massachusetts. But the ship foundered in October 1860 in a storm off approximately 100 nautical miles (190 km) from Boston. Although all of the lifeboats were smashed in the storm, all of the passengers and crew aboard were saved by the heroic actions of a fruit transport ship, the Minni Schiffer, and her Captain, John Wilson.

The wreck was rediscovered in 2014 by The Endurance Exploration Group, Inc. Endurance Exploration was appointed custodian of the wreck by the courts, a precursor to a potential salvage claim.

The wreck is believed to contain approximately 10,000 gold sovereigns amongst other cargo. The potential value of the cargo is said to be in the millions of dollars.

== History ==
The Connaught was originally built by the Palmers Shipbuilding and Iron Company in Jarrow, England as a passenger ship for the Atlantic Royal Mail Steam Navigation Company, Ltd. It had an iron hull, a single steam engine which drove two side-paddle wheels. It has been described as the Titanic of its day, a reference both to its early sinking, but also to its relative size and opulence compared against other passenger ships at the time it was launched.

The Connaught's first trip was from Galway, Ireland to Boston, Massachusetts via St. John's, Newfoundland. The ship departed on 25 September 1860 with 50 first-class passengers, 417 steerage passengers, and a crew of 125. The ship successfully crossed the Atlantic Ocean to St. John's, and then departed to travel onward to Boston.

== Sinking ==
In the early days of October 1860, approximately 100 miles (160 km) from Boston a storm hit. Side paddle wheels are not an optimum structure for vessels in stormy seas, and the ship sprung a leak. The leak was brought under control, but due to the extra stress on the coal-fired steam engine a fire had by then started below deck. On 7 October 1860 the smoke and flames forced passengers and crew up on to the top deck in the storm. The lifeboats were lowered, but the waves smashed them against the ship's iron hull. According to eyewitness accounts, the hulls of the Connaught became so hot that they boiled the waves as they crashed over her.

A small fruit merchant ship, the Minni Schiffer, sailed to intercept. The women and children were evacuated first, followed by the male passengers and crew. Reports indicate that so many people boarded the tiny transport that they stood on every available patch of deck, and that some were even clinging to the tall masts and rigging. Lastly, the captain of the Connaught joined them.

After all hands had abandoned ship, the Connaught swiftly broke up and sank. 591 passengers and crew were transferred from one of the largest passenger ships of the day to a tiny merchant vessel, during a storm, without a single loss of life. The Minni Schiffer then arrived at Boston's India Wharf on the following day.

== Rediscovery ==
In 2012 the Endurance Exploration Group Inc, a company specialising in shipwreck research, survey and recovery, identified the SS Connaught as one of about 20 shipwrecks that it prioritised to locate. In 2013, after an exhaustive side sonar scan search it identified what it believed to be the wreck of the Connaught in the waters off Boston, noting the highly distinctive side paddles. Subsequent dives with a remote operated vehicle in 2014 were able to retrieve artifacts from the wreck site which positively identified the vessel as an Atlantic Royal Mail Steam Navigation Company ship.

Based upon the evidence available, the company were able to obtain an order from U.S. District Court for the Middle District of Florida, Tampa Division for the arrest of the shipwreck Connaught, and for the court to take jurisdiction over the wreck. The U.S. Marshals arrested the hull fragments collected by Endurance Exploration, and Endurance Exploration was appointed by the Court as substitute custodian of the recovered hull fragment artifacts and any future artifacts recovered from the Connaught. The court order was made in anticipation of a future salvage claim in the event that valuable cargo is recovered.

The precise coordinates of the wreck site have not been made publicly available, but it has been stated in various sources that the wreckage is believed to lie in international waters.
