= Newspaper Licensing Ireland =

Irish nonprofit company

Newspaper Licensing Ireland Ltd (NLI) is an Irish not for profit company which provides licences to organisations to copy and distribute copyrighted material from print sources, such as from newspapers and magazines. The company, which was established in 2002, was set up by the National Newspapers of Ireland group, later renamed "NewsBrands Ireland". In 2012 and 2013, Newspaper Licensing Ireland gained attention, and posted a "clarifying statement", relating to its reported position on charging organisations to hyperlink to newspaper articles.

== Formation and membership ==
Newspaper Licensing Ireland (NLI) was established in 2002 by the National Newspapers of Ireland (NNI) group. Its establishment was prompted by the use and distribution of press cuttings, by businesses, to their employees, clients and customers. Newspaper articles that are photocopied, scanned, passed around or published on an intranet or website may be subject to copyright, and, if so, must be licensed. The NLI was set up in response to changes to Irish copyright law, introduced by the Copyright and Related Rights Act 2000, which equipped content owners with new methods to assert copyright over their publications.

The members of the NLI are companies involved in the printing industry in Ireland. As of 2011, the organisation reportedly represented the intellectual property interests of eight national and 24 regional newspaper publishers, representing 110 newspaper publications. NLI is a member of the International Federation of Reproduction Rights Organisations (IFRRO).

== Controversy ==
=== NNI submission ===
In 2012, the NNI (the organisation that set up the NLI) made a submission to the Copyright Review Committee of the Department of Justice and Equality, relating to its position on hyperlinking which asserted that it was "the view of NNI that a link to copyright material does constitute infringement of copyright".

=== "Cease and desist" to Women's Aid charity ===
In May 2012, McGarr Solicitors stated that they had helped to draft a response to Newspaper Licensing Ireland on behalf of Women's Aid Ireland, a charity that helps victims of domestic violence, after the latter had received a cease and desist letter that sought money from the charity for linking to online newspaper articles that included positive mentions of the charity's work. In their letter, NLI alleged that the reproduction of copyrighted content without permission is theft, and that Women's Aid "will be breaking the law" if they did not comply with the NLI's demands.

The NLI letter, which was described in the Irish Times as having attracted "widespread criticism", sought a licence fee not for actual reproduction of an article or the publication of an excerpt from an article, but merely for publishing a hyperlink to news articles. The NLI licence price-list, at the time, reportedly ranged from €300 for 1–5 links published annually, to €1,250 for 26–50 links published annually, with the price for publishing more than 50 links being "negotiable". The reply to NLI pointed out that the terms and conditions of the NLI's member newspaper websites in many cases explicitly granted permission to produce weblinks to articles and that some NLI member websites included sharing buttons to encourage the creation of weblinks for use on social media.

In December 2012, McGarr Solicitors issued a follow-up press release on the topic. Following a tweet linking to the release by Graham Linehan, the topic was covered internationally by media outlets including Boing Boing, The New York Observer, The Guardian and Forbes. It was also addressed by Professors of Journalism Jay Rosen, Jeff Jarvis and George Brock. An opinion piece published by McGarr, on Irish news website TheJournal.ie, contrasted the international coverage of the story with a lack of coverage in Irish print media.
